= List of governors of Florida =

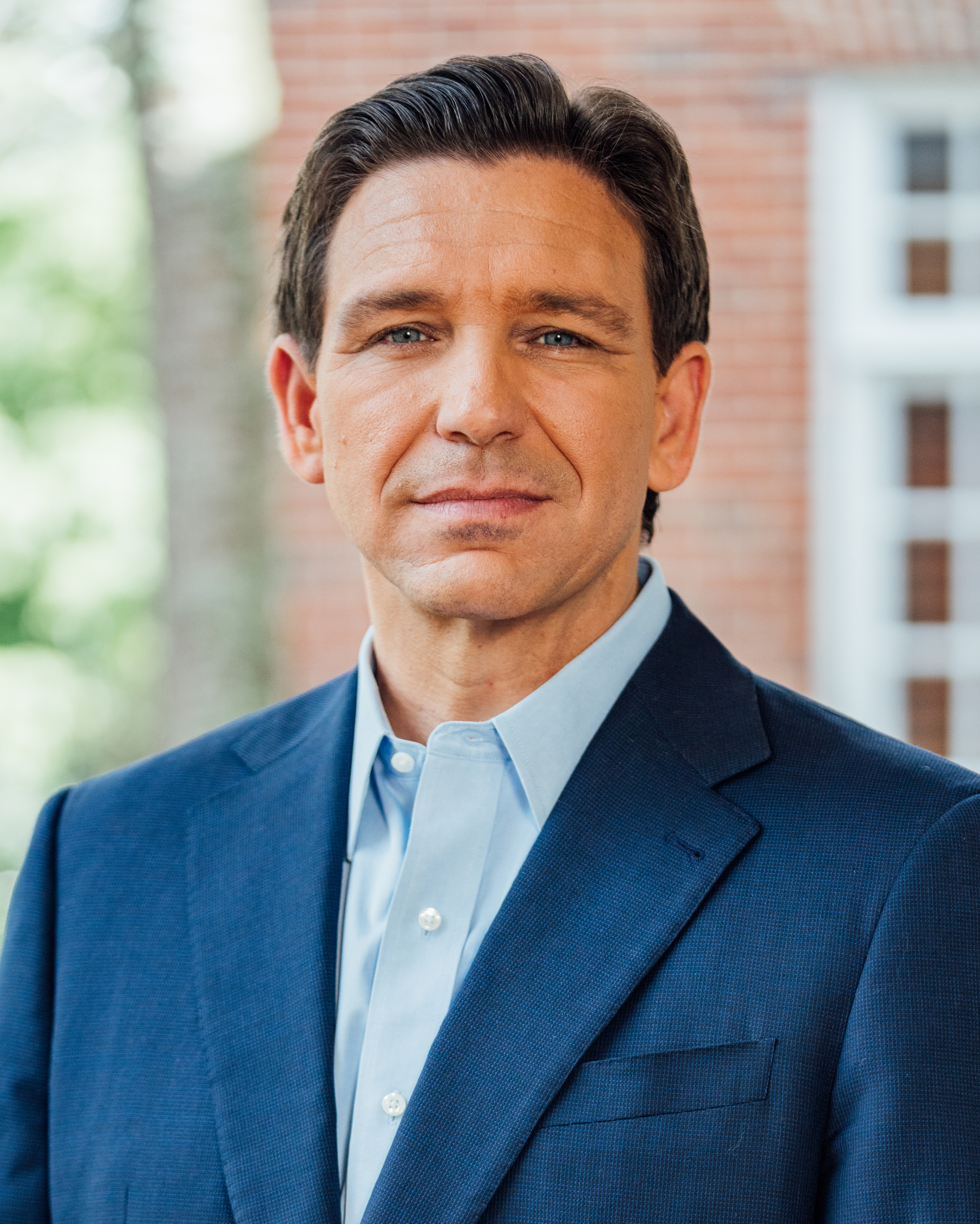
Ron DeSantis has been governor since January 8, 2019.

The governor of Florida is the head of government of the U.S. state of Florida. The governor is the head of the executive branch of the government of Florida and is the commander-in-chief of the Florida National Guard and Florida State Guard.

The current officeholder is Ron DeSantis, a member of the Republican Party who took office on January 8, 2019.

== List of governors ==
=== Military governor ===
The United States acquired Spanish Florida from Spain by the terms of the Adams–Onís Treaty, which took effect February 22, 1821, after its ratification by both parties to the treaty. Parts of West Florida had already been assigned to Alabama, Louisiana, and Mississippi; the remainder and East Florida were governed by a military commissioner with the powers of governor until the territory was organized and incorporated.

United States Commissioner and Governor of East and West Florida
Commissioner	Term in office	Appointed by
Andrew Jackson (1767–1845)	March 10, 1821 – December 31, 1821 (267 days; resigned) (Note: Jackson left Florida on October 8, 1821. His resignation was submitted on November 13, and the president accepted it on December 31.)	James Monroe

=== Territory of Florida ===
Florida Territory was organized on March 30, 1822, combining East and West Florida.

Governors of the Territory of Florida
No.	Governor	Term in office (Note: The range given is from the date the governor was confirmed by the Senate, or appointed by the President during a Senate recess, to the date the governor's successor was confirmed, unless noted.)	Appointed by
1	William Pope Duval (1784–1854)	April 17, 1822 (Note: Duval was nominated to be "Governor of the Floridas" on April 15, 1822. This was withdrawn and he was nominated to be "Governor of the Territory of Florida" on April 16, and confirmed by the Senate to that position on April 17. No source specifies when he took office, but it was reported he reached Pensacola, then the capital, on June 22. He was reconfirmed on March 8, 1825; reappointed during Senate recesses on January 9, 1828, and April 18, 1831; and reconfirmed by the Senate on April 30, 1832.) – April 17, 1834 (Note: The nomination of Duval's successor says his commission would expire on April 17, 1834.) (4384 days; replaced) (Note: At some point in 1827, the territorial secretary William M. McCarty acted as governor.)	James Monroe
1	William Pope Duval (1784–1854)	April 17, 1822 – April 17, 1834 (4384 days; replaced)	John Quincy Adams
1	William Pope Duval (1784–1854)	April 17, 1822 – April 17, 1834 (4384 days; replaced)	Andrew Jackson
2	John Eaton (1790–1856)	April 24, 1834 (Note: Eaton was nominated on March 29, 1834, for a term beginning April 17, when his predecessor's commission expired; confirmed by the Senate on April 24; and took office on December 11.) – March 16, 1836 (693 days; replaced)	Andrew Jackson
3	Richard K. Call (1792–1862)	March 16, 1836 (Note: Call was nominated on February 18, 1836, confirmed by the Senate on March 16, and took office on April 4. He was reconfirmed by the Senate on February 21, 1839.) – December 2, 1839 (Note: Multiple sources say Call's term ended on December 2, 1836, but none say why, nor why this happened before his successor's confirmation on December 12.) (1357 days; replaced)	Andrew Jackson
3	Richard K. Call (1792–1862)	March 16, 1836 – December 2, 1839 (1357 days; replaced)	Martin Van Buren
4	Robert R. Reid (1789–1841)	December 12, 1839 (Note: Reid was nominated on December 11, 1839, and confirmed by the Senate on December 12.) – March 19, 1841 (464 days; replaced)	Martin Van Buren
5	Richard K. Call (1792–1862)	March 19, 1841 (Note: Call was appointed on March 19, 1841, during a Senate recess; nominated on June 17; and confirmed by the Senate on August 11.) – August 11, 1844 (1242 days; replaced)	William Henry Harrison
5	Richard K. Call (1792–1862)	March 19, 1841 – August 11, 1844 (1242 days; replaced)	John Tyler
6	John Branch (1782–1863)	August 11, 1844 (Note: Branch was nominated on June 14, 1844, and confirmed by the Senate on June 15, for a term to start August 11.) – June 25, 1845 (319 days; statehood)	John Tyler

=== State of Florida ===
The State of Florida was admitted to the Union on March 3, 1845. It seceded from the Union on January 10, 1861, and joined the Confederate States of America on February 8, 1861, as a founding member. Following the end of the American Civil War, it was part of the Third Military District. Florida was readmitted to the Union on June 25, 1868. (Note: The readmission was contingent on Florida ratifying the Fourteenth Amendment to the United States Constitution; they were proclaimed on July 11, 1868, to have done so before the readmission act's passage.)

The Florida Constitution of 1838 provided that a governor be elected every 4 years, who was not allowed to serve consecutive terms. The secessionist constitution of 1861 would have reduced this to two years and removed the term limit, but the state fell to the Union before the first election under that constitution. The 1868 constitution maintained the four-year term, though without the earlier term limit, which was reintroduced in the 1885 constitution. The current constitution of 1968 states that should the governor serve, or would have served had he not resigned, more than six years in two consecutive terms, he cannot be elected to the succeeding term. The start of a term was set in 1885 at the first Tuesday after the first Monday in the January following the election, where it has remained.

Originally, the president of the state senate acted as governor should that office be vacant. The 1868 constitution created the office of lieutenant governor, who would similarly act as governor. This office was abolished in 1885, with the president of the senate again taking on that duty. The 1968 constitution recreated the office of lieutenant governor, who now becomes governor in the absence of the governor. The governor and lieutenant governor are elected on the same ticket.

Florida was a strongly Democratic state before the Civil War, electing only one candidate from the Whig Party. It elected three Republican governors following Reconstruction, but after the Democratic Party re-established control, 90 years passed before voters chose another Republican. Since 1998, it has been a strongly Republican state.

Governors of the State of Florida
No.	Governor	Term in office	Party	Election	Lt. Governor (Note: The office of lieutenant governor was created in 1868, abolished in 1885, and recreated in 1968.) (Note: Lieutenant governors represented the same party as their governor unless noted.)
1	William Dunn Moseley (1795–1863)	June 25, 1845 – October 1, 1849 (1560 days; term-limited) (Note: Under the 1838 constitution, governors were ineligible for reelection until four years had passed.)	Democratic	1845	Office did not exist
2	Thomas Brown (1785–1867)	October 1, 1849 – October 3, 1853 (1464 days; term-limited)	Whig	1848	Office did not exist
3	James E. Broome (1808–1883)	October 3, 1853 – October 5, 1857 (1464 days; term-limited)	Democratic	1852	Office did not exist
4	Madison S. Perry (1814–1865)	October 5, 1857 – October 7, 1861 (1464 days; term-limited)	Democratic	1856	Office did not exist
5	John Milton (1807–1865)	October 7, 1861 – April 1, 1865 (1273 days; died in office) (Note: Milton committed suicide due to the pending defeat of the Confederate States of America, stating in his final address to the legislature that "death would be preferable to reunion.")	Democratic	1860	Office did not exist
6	Abraham K. Allison (1810–1893)	April 1, 1865 – May 19, 1865 (49 days; resigned) (Note: Allison resigned to go into hiding from approaching Union troops, and was captured by them on June 19, 1865.)	Democratic	President of the Senate acting	Office did not exist
—	Vacant	May 19, 1865 – July 13, 1865 (56 days)	Office vacated after Civil War		Office did not exist
7	William Marvin (1808–1902)	July 13, 1865 – December 20, 1865 (161 days; retired)	Provisional governor appointed by President		Office did not exist
8	David S. Walker (1815–1891)	December 20, 1865 – July 4, 1868 (928 days; retired)	Conservative	1865	William W. J. Kelly (Note: Represented the Republican Party)
9	Harrison Reed (1813–1899)	July 4, 1868 (Note: Reed was popularly elected under the terms of the 1868 constitution, and took the oath of office on June 8, 1868; however, the federal commander of Florida did not recognize the validity of the state constitution and the election until July 4.) – January 7, 1873 (1649 days; lost nomination)	Republican	1868	William Henry Gleason (removed December 14, 1868) (Note: During an attempted impeachment of Reed, Gleason proclaimed himself governor. The Supreme Court eventually sided with Reed, and Gleason was removed from office.)
9	Harrison Reed (1813–1899)	July 4, 1868 – January 7, 1873 (1649 days; lost nomination)	Republican	1868	Vacant
9	Harrison Reed (1813–1899)	July 4, 1868 – January 7, 1873 (1649 days; lost nomination)	Republican	1868	Edmund C. Weeks (appointed January 24, 1870) (term ended December 27, 1870) (Note: Appointed as temporary lieutenant governor to replace William Henry Gleason. However, the state comptroller did not believe the governor could appoint a replacement to an elected office and refused to pay Weeks, and the Senate refused to accept his presidency over them, even proposing a motion to arrest him. Governor Reed called for a special election to replace him, and though Weeks fought it, the Florida Supreme Court declared his term to have ended when the new election results were certified.)
9	Harrison Reed (1813–1899)	July 4, 1868 – January 7, 1873 (1649 days; lost nomination)	Republican	1868	Samuel T. Day (took office December 27, 1870)
10	Ossian B. Hart (1821–1874)	January 7, 1873 – March 18, 1874 (436 days; died in office)	Republican	1872	Marcellus Stearns
11	Marcellus Stearns (1839–1891)	March 18, 1874 – January 2, 1877 (1022 days; lost election)	Republican	Lieutenant governor acting	Acting as governor
12	George Franklin Drew (1827–1900)	January 2, 1877 – January 4, 1881 (1464 days; retired)	Democratic	1876	Noble A. Hull (resigned March 3, 1879)
12	George Franklin Drew (1827–1900)	January 2, 1877 – January 4, 1881 (1464 days; retired)	Democratic	1876	Vacant
13	William D. Bloxham (1835–1911)	January 4, 1881 – January 6, 1885 (1464 days; lost nomination)	Democratic	1880	Livingston W. Bethel
14	Edward A. Perry (1831–1889)	January 6, 1885 – January 8, 1889 (1464 days; term-limited) (Note: Under the 1885 constitution, governors were ineligible for reelection for the succeeding term.)	Democratic	1884	Milton H. Mabry
15	Francis P. Fleming (1841–1908)	January 8, 1889 – January 3, 1893 (1457 days; term-limited)	Democratic	1888	Office did not exist
16	Henry L. Mitchell (1831–1903)	January 3, 1893 – January 5, 1897 (1464 days; term-limited) (Note: Mitchell, being term-limited, had already been elected Clerk of the Circuit Court of Hillsborough County when his term ended.)	Democratic	1892	Office did not exist
17	William D. Bloxham (1835–1911)	January 5, 1897 – January 8, 1901 (1464 days; term-limited)	Democratic	1896	Office did not exist
18	William Sherman Jennings (1863–1920)	January 8, 1901 – January 3, 1905 (1457 days; term-limited)	Democratic	1900	Office did not exist
19	Napoleon B. Broward (1857–1910)	January 3, 1905 – January 5, 1909 (1464 days; term-limited)	Democratic	1904	Office did not exist
20	Albert W. Gilchrist (1858–1926)	January 5, 1909 – January 7, 1913 (1464 days; term-limited)	Democratic	1908	Office did not exist
21	Park Trammell (1876–1936)	January 7, 1913 – January 2, 1917 (1457 days; term-limited) (Note: Trammell, being term-limited, had already been elected to the United States Senate when his term ended.)	Democratic	1912	Office did not exist
22	Sidney Johnston Catts (1863–1936)	January 2, 1917 – January 4, 1921 (1464 days; term-limited) (Note: Catts, being term-limited, had already lost the Democratic nomination for the United States Senate when his term ended.)	Prohibition	1916	Office did not exist
23	Cary A. Hardee (1876–1957)	January 4, 1921 – January 6, 1925 (1464 days; term-limited)	Democratic	1920	Office did not exist
24	John W. Martin (1884–1958)	January 6, 1925 – January 8, 1929 (1464 days; term-limited) (Note: Martin, being term-limited, had already lost the Democratic nomination for the United States Senate when his term ended.)	Democratic	1924	Office did not exist
25	Doyle E. Carlton (1885–1972)	January 8, 1929 – January 3, 1933 (1457 days; term-limited)	Democratic	1928	Office did not exist
26	David Sholtz (1891–1953)	January 3, 1933 – January 5, 1937 (1464 days; term-limited)	Democratic	1932	Office did not exist
27	Fred P. Cone (1871–1948)	January 5, 1937 – January 7, 1941 (1464 days; term-limited) (Note: Cone, being term-limited, had already lost the Democratic nomination for the United States Senate when his term ended.)	Democratic	1936	Office did not exist
28	Spessard Holland (1892–1971)	January 7, 1941 – January 2, 1945 (1457 days; term-limited)	Democratic	1940	Office did not exist
29	Millard Caldwell (1897–1984)	January 2, 1945 – January 4, 1949 (1464 days; term-limited)	Democratic	1944	Office did not exist
30	Fuller Warren (1905–1973)	January 4, 1949 – January 6, 1953 (1464 days; term-limited)	Democratic	1948	Office did not exist
31	Daniel T. McCarty (1912–1953)	January 6, 1953 – September 28, 1953 (266 days; died in office)	Democratic	1952	Office did not exist
32	Charley Eugene Johns (1905–1990)	September 28, 1953 – January 4, 1955 (464 days; lost nomination) (Note: Johns, having lost the Democratic nomination for governor, returned to his seat in the Florida Senate.)	Democratic	President of the Senate acting	Office did not exist
33	LeRoy Collins (1909–1991)	January 4, 1955 – January 3, 1961 (2192 days; term-limited)	Democratic	1954 (special) (Note: Special election to fill the remainder of McCarty's term)	Office did not exist
33	LeRoy Collins (1909–1991)	January 4, 1955 – January 3, 1961 (2192 days; term-limited)	Democratic	1956	Office did not exist
34	C. Farris Bryant (1914–2002)	January 3, 1961 – January 5, 1965 (1464 days; term-limited)	Democratic	1960	Office did not exist
35	W. Haydon Burns (1912–1987)	January 5, 1965 – January 3, 1967 (729 days; lost nomination) (Note: Burns lost the Democratic nomination to Robert King High. A constitutional amendment shifted the election schedule two years, and allowed the governor elected in 1964 to run for a second term.)	Democratic	1964 (Note: This term was only two years as the election schedule was changed so that it would not coincide with presidential elections.)	Office did not exist
36	Claude R. Kirk Jr. (1926–2011)	January 3, 1967 – January 5, 1971 (1464 days; lost election)	Republican	1966	Office did not exist
36	Claude R. Kirk Jr. (1926–2011)	January 3, 1967 – January 5, 1971 (1464 days; lost election)	Republican	1966	Ray Osborne (office created January 7, 1969)
37	Reubin Askew (1928–2014)	January 5, 1971 – January 2, 1979 (2920 days; term-limited) (Note: Under the 1968 constitution, those who have served more than six years in two consecutive terms are ineligible for election to governor.)	Democratic	1970	Thomas Burton Adams Jr.
37	Reubin Askew (1928–2014)	January 5, 1971 – January 2, 1979 (2920 days; term-limited)	Democratic	1974	Jim Williams
38	Bob Graham (1936–2024)	January 2, 1979 – January 3, 1987 (2924 days; resigned) (Note: Graham resigned as he was already term-limited, having been elected to the United States Senate.)	Democratic	1978	Wayne Mixson
38	Bob Graham (1936–2024)	January 2, 1979 – January 3, 1987 (2924 days; resigned)	Democratic	1982	Wayne Mixson
39	Wayne Mixson (1922–2020)	January 3, 1987 – January 6, 1987 (4 days; retired) (Note: Mixson was not nominated in the 1986 gubernatorial election.)	Democratic	Succeeded from lieutenant governor	Vacant
40	Bob Martinez (b. 1934)	January 6, 1987 – January 8, 1991 (1464 days; lost election)	Republican	1986	Bobby Brantley
41	Lawton Chiles (1930–1998)	January 8, 1991 – December 12, 1998 (2896 days; died in office) (Note: Chiles was already term-limited at the time of his death.)	Democratic	1990	Buddy MacKay
41	Lawton Chiles (1930–1998)	January 8, 1991 – December 12, 1998 (2896 days; died in office)	Democratic	1994	Buddy MacKay
42	Buddy MacKay (1933–2024)	December 12, 1998 – January 5, 1999 (25 days; retired) (Note: MacKay had already lost in the 1998 gubernatorial election.)	Democratic	Succeeded from lieutenant governor	Vacant
43	Jeb Bush (b. 1953)	January 5, 1999 – January 2, 2007 (2920 days; term-limited)	Republican	1998	Frank Brogan (resigned March 3, 2003)
43	Jeb Bush (b. 1953)	January 5, 1999 – January 2, 2007 (2920 days; term-limited)	Republican	2002	Frank Brogan (resigned March 3, 2003)
43	Jeb Bush (b. 1953)	January 5, 1999 – January 2, 2007 (2920 days; term-limited)	Republican	2002	Toni Jennings
44	Charlie Crist (b. 1956)	January 2, 2007 – January 4, 2011 (1464 days; retired) (Note: Crist instead ran unsuccessfully for the United States Senate.)	Republican (Note: Crist was elected as a member of the Republican Party, and switched to independent in April 2010.)	2006	Jeff Kottkamp
45	Rick Scott (b. 1952)	January 4, 2011 – January 7, 2019 (Note: Due to Ron DeSantis and Jeanette Nuñez taking their oath of office ahead of time, they became governor and lieutenant governor at midnight on January 8, rather than waiting for an inauguration ceremony. Thus, Scott and Lopez-Cantera's terms ended at the end of January 7.) (2926 days; term-limited) (Note: Scott, being term-limited, had already been elected to the United States Senate when his term ended.)	Republican	2010	Jennifer Carroll (resigned March 12, 2013)
45	Rick Scott (b. 1952)	January 4, 2011 – January 7, 2019 (2926 days; term-limited)	Republican	2010	Vacant
45	Rick Scott (b. 1952)	January 4, 2011 – January 7, 2019 (2926 days; term-limited)	Republican	2010	Carlos Lopez-Cantera (appointed February 3, 2014)
45	Rick Scott (b. 1952)	January 4, 2011 – January 7, 2019 (2926 days; term-limited)	Republican	2014	Carlos Lopez-Cantera (appointed February 3, 2014)
46	Ron DeSantis (b. 1978)	January 8, 2019 – Incumbent (Note: DeSantis' second term began on January 3, 2023, and will expire on January 5, 2027; he is term-limited.) (in office 2876 days)	Republican	2018	Jeanette Nuñez (resigned February 16, 2025)
46	Ron DeSantis (b. 1978)	January 8, 2019 – Incumbent (in office 2876 days)	Republican	2022	Jeanette Nuñez (resigned February 16, 2025)
46	Ron DeSantis (b. 1978)	January 8, 2019 – Incumbent (in office 2876 days)	Republican	2022	Vacant
46	Ron DeSantis (b. 1978)	January 8, 2019 – Incumbent (in office 2876 days)	Republican	2022	Jay Collins (appointed August 12, 2025)
47	Byron Donalds (b. 1978)	Governor-elect takes office January 5, 2027	Republican	2026	Bryan Avila

== Acting governor ==
Florida has had a number of people serve as acting governor. The state's first three constitutions provided that the succession in office became operative whenever the governor was out of the state. Thus, in 1853 when Governor Thomas Brown attended an event in Boston—the Senate president who would normally succeed the governor at the time was also out of state. Therefore, the speaker of the Florida House of Representatives, A.K. Allison, became acting governor on September 16, 1853. He served for 17 days.

Article IV Section 3 (b) of the Florida Constitution now calls for the lieutenant governor to "act as Governor" during the governor's physical or mental incapacity. This provision has been invoked one time. On June 18, 2008, Governor Charlie Crist filed a proclamation with the secretary of state transferring power of governor to Lt. Governor Jeff Kottkamp pursuant to the constitutional provision while he underwent knee surgery.

== See also ==
- Gubernatorial lines of succession in the United States § Florida
- First ladies of Florida
- Lieutenant Governor of Florida
- List of Florida state legislatures

== Sources ==
- "Former Florida Governors". National Governors Association.
- "A Guide to Florida Governors and the Florida Cabinet". Florida Memory. Archived from the original on October 21, 2026.
- "Florida Constitution". State Democracy Research Initiative. University of Wisconsin Law School.
- Dubin, Michael J. (2003). United States Gubernatorial Elections, 1776–1860: The Official Results by State and County. McFarland. ISBN 0-7864-1439-1 – via Internet Archive.
- Glashan, Roy R. (1979). American Governors and Gubernatorial Elections, 1775-1978. Meckler Books. ISBN 0-7201-1511-6 – via Internet Archive.
- Kallenbach, Joseph E.; Kallenbach, Jessamine S. (1977). American State Governors, 1776-1976. Oceana Publications. ISBN 978-0-379-00665-0 – via Internet Archive.
- McMullin, Thomas A.; Walker, David (1984). Biographical Directory of American Territorial Governors. Meckler Publishing. ISBN 0-930466-11-X – via Internet Archive.
- Mullaney, Marie Marmo (1994). Biographical Directory of the Governors of the United States, 1988–1994. Greenwood Publishing Group. ISBN 0-313-28312-5 – via Internet Archive.
- Sobel, Robert; Raimo, John (1978). Biographical Directory of the Governors of the United States, 1789-1978. Vol. 1. Meckler Books. ISBN 0-930466-01-2 – via Internet Archive.
- Thorpe, Francis Newton, ed. (1909). The Federal and State Constitutions, Colonial Charters, and Other Organic Laws of the States, Territories, and Colonies Now or Heretofore Forming the United States of America. Vol. 2. United States Government Publishing Office – via Internet Archive.
