= 1970 Florida gubernatorial election =

- November 3, 1970
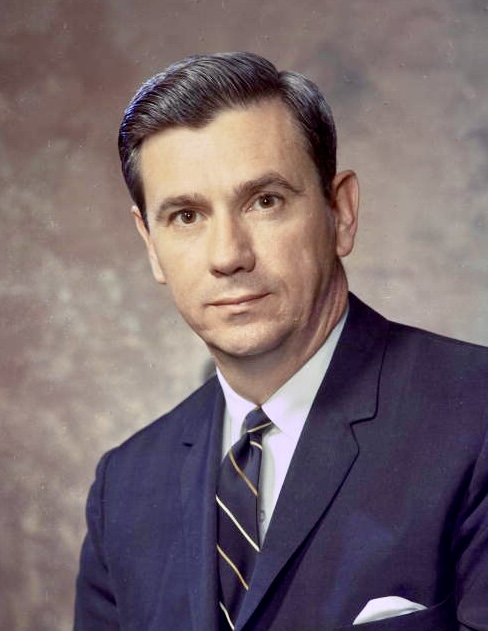

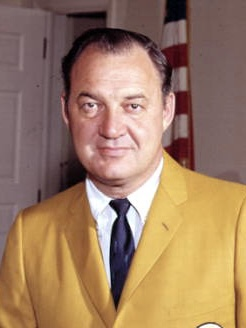
Nominee	Reubin Askew	Claude R. Kirk Jr.
Party	Democratic	Republican
Running mate	Thomas B. Adams Jr.	Ray Osborne
Popular vote	984,305	746,243
Percentage	56.99%	43.12%
- County results Askew: 50–60% 60–70% 70–80% 80–90% Kirk: 50–60% 60–70%
Governor before election
Claude R. Kirk Jr.
Republican
Elected Governor
Reubin Askew
Democratic

The 1970 Florida gubernatorial election took place on November 3, 1970, to elect the governor and lieutenant governor of Florida. Republican incumbent Claude R. Kirk Jr. ran for re-election to a second term but was defeated by Reubin Askew. This was the first election in which a Florida governor was eligible to run for a second consecutive term and the first election following the reestablishment of the office of lieutenant governor in 1969.

Primary elections were held on September 8. Kirk, the first Republican governor since the Reconstruction era, had made a number of controversial statements and decisions during his first term and feuded with U.S. representative Bill Cramer. He was challenged by Jack Eckerd and state senator Skip Bafalis for his party's nomination. After failing to achieve a majority of the vote, he advanced to a runoff with Eckerd. In the Democratic primary, Askew and attorney general Earl Faircloth advanced to a runoff election. Both candidates won their September 29 runoffs with around 57 percent of the vote.

In the general election, Kirk sought to portray Askew as an extreme liberal, as he had done to Robert King High in 1966. Kirk lost re-election to Askew in the general election by a margin of 56.88% to 43.12%.

== Background ==
Incumbent governor of Florida Claude R. Kirk Jr. was the first Republican who held Florida's governorship since Reconstruction. He was elected in 1966, when Republicans has made some gains in traditionally Democratic Deep South. During his tenure as governor, the Florida Legislature created a new Constitution in 1968, which was approved by voters on November 5, 1968. As part of the new Constitution, the office of lieutenant governor was re-established. Kirk appointed Ray Osborne, a state representative from Pinellas County. The new Constitution also allowed for the governor of Florida to serve two consecutive terms. Kirk was thus eligible for re-election in 1970.

== Republican primary ==
=== Candidates ===
- Skip Bafalis, state senator from Palm Beach
  - Running mate: Ward Dougherty, Lutz rancher
- Jack Eckerd, owner of Eckerd Corporation
  - Running mate: Robert Elrod, former state senator from Orange County
- Claude R. Kirk Jr., incumbent governor since 1967
  - Running mate: Ray Osborne, incumbent lieutenant governor since 1969

=== Campaign ===
During the Republican primary, incumbent Claude Kirk was challenged by state senator Skip Bafalis from Palm Beach and Eckerd Corporation founder Jack Eckerd of Clearwater. The Miami Herald endorsed Eckerd, stating that he is "an efficient campaigner with the ability to bring people together constructively. ... [Eckerd has] a common touch, dedication to high principle, and organizing genius." William C. Cramer, a powerful Republican in the state and the party's senate nominee for that year, publicly remained neutral during the primary, but voted for Eckerd. Later, Eckerd himself would state, "I was offended by his [Kirk's] public behavior and chagrined that he was a Republican."

In the primary election held on September 8, Kirk reached first place with 48.16% of the vote, compared to 38.37% for Eckerd, and 13.48% for Bafalis. However, because Kirk failed to receive a majority of the votes, he and Eckerd advanced to a run-off election. 8.1% of the voting age population participated in the Republican primary.

=== Results ===
1970 Republican gubernatorial primary
Party	Candidate	Votes	%
Republican	Claude R. Kirk Jr. (incumbent)	172,888	48.16%
Republican	Jack Eckerd	137,731	38.37%
Republican	Louis A. Bafalis	48,378	13.48%
Total votes		358,997	100.00%

=== Runoff results ===
Republican Primary Runoff by county Kirk: 50–60%; 60–70%; 70–80%; 80–90%; >90%; Eckerd: 50–60%; 60–70%

In the run-off election on September 29, Kirk received 199,943 votes versus Eckerd's 152,327 votes, by 47,616 votes – a margin of approximately 13.52%.

1970 Republican gubernatorial run-off
Party	Candidate	Votes	%
Republican	Claude R. Kirk Jr. (incumbent)	199,943	56.76%
Republican	Jack Eckerd	152,327	43.24%
Total votes		352,270	100.00%

== Democratic primary ==
=== Candidates ===
- Reubin Askew, president pro tempore of the Florida Senate from Pensacola
  - Running mate: Thomas Burton Adams Jr., secretary of state of Florida
- Earl Faircloth, Florida attorney general
  - Running mate: George Tapper, former state senator from Port St. Joe
- Chuck Hall, mayor of Dade County
  - Running mate: Pat Thomas, chair of the Florida Democratic Party
- John E. Mathews Jr., state representative from Jacksonville and candidate for governor in 1964
  - Running mate: Elton Gissendanner, former state representative from North Miami and candidate for U.S. House in 1968

=== Results ===
In primaries, held on September 8, none of these candidates was able to win majority. As a result, the top two finishers, Faircloth and Askew, advanced to a runoff election. 17.1% of the voting age population participated in the Democratic primary.

1970 Democratic gubernatorial primary
Party	Candidate	Votes	%
Democratic	Earl Faircloth	227,413	29.96%
Democratic	Reubin Askew	206,333	27.18%
Democratic	John E. Matthews	186,053	24.51%
Democratic	Chuck Hall	139,384	18.36%
Total votes		759,183	100.00%

=== Run-off ===
Democratic Primary Runoff by county Askew: 50–60%; 60–70%; 70–80%; 80–90%; Faircloth: 50–60%; 60–70%

Although the primary election was a close race, Askew defeated Faircloth by a relatively wide margin in the run-off election on September 29. Askew earned 447,025 votes against Faircloth's 328,038 votes, by 312,158 votes – a margin of approximately 15.36%. Askew selected Florida Secretary of State Thomas Burton Adams Jr. to be his running mate.

1970 Democratic gubernatorial runoff
Party	Candidate	Votes	%
Democratic	Reubin Askew	447,025	57.68%
Democratic	Earl Faircloth	328,038	42.32%
Total votes		775,063	100.00%

== General election ==
=== Candidates ===
- Reubin Askew, president pro tempore of the Florida Senate from Pensacola (Democratic)
  - Running mate: Thomas Burton Adams Jr., secretary of state of Florida
- Claude R. Kirk Jr., incumbent governor since 1967 (Republican)
  - Running mate: Ray Osborne, incumbent lieutenant governor since 1969

=== Campaign ===
In response to the schism between Cramer and Kirk, the Miami Herald endorsed Askew and noted that "Askew and Chiles form a logical team; Kirk and Cramer don’t". Kirk mocked Askew as a "momma’s boy who wouldn’t have the courage to stand up under the fire of the legislators" and as a "nice, sweet-looking fellow chosen by ‘liberals’ ... to front for them." Despite promising no new taxes and several attempts to label Askew a "liberal", Kirk had overseen what was then the largest tax increase in Florida history.

=== Results ===
Askew and Adams defeated incumbents Governor Kirk and Lieutenant Governor Ray Osborne with respectable margin.

Gubernatorial Election– November 3, 1970
Party	Candidate	Votes	%
Democratic	Reubin Askew	984,305	56.88%
Republican	Claude Roy Kirk, Jr. (incumbent)	746,243	43.12%
Total votes		1,730,548	100.00%
Democratic gain from Republican			

On the very same day Florida elected to the United States Senate Democrat Lawton Chiles, who later was elected governor in 1990.

== Works cited ==
- Steed, Robert; Moreland, Laurence; Baker, Tod, eds. (1980). Party Politics in the South. Praeger Publishers. ISBN 0030565863.
