= Claude R. Kirk Jr. =

36th governor of Florida

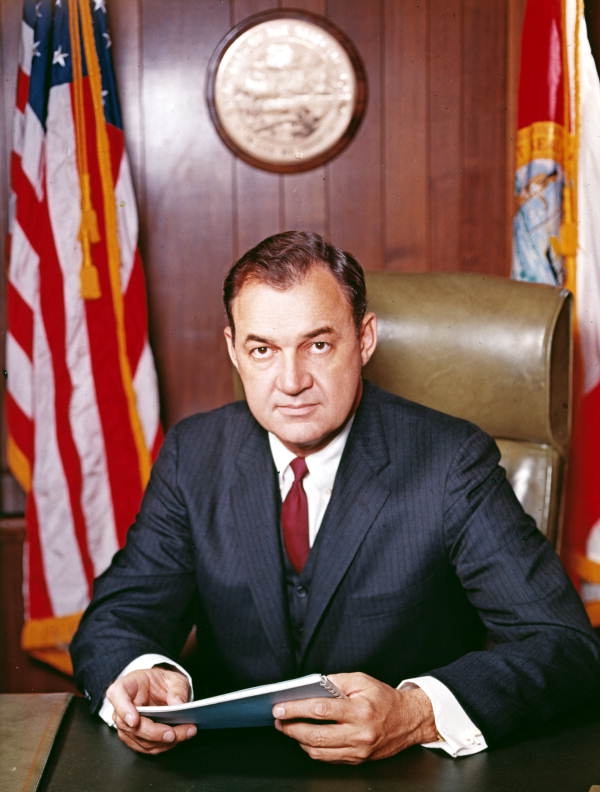
- Official portrait, 1967

36th Governor of Florida
- In office January 3, 1967 – January 5, 1971
- Lieutenant: Vacant; Ray Osborne
- Preceded by: W. Haydon Burns
- Succeeded by: Reubin Askew

Personal details
- Born: Claude Roy Kirk Jr. January 7, 1926 San Bernardino, California, U.S.
- Died: September 28, 2011 (aged 85) West Palm Beach, Florida, U.S.
- Resting place: South Florida National Cemetery, Lake Worth Beach, Florida, U.S.
- Party: Republican (1960–1978, 1990–2011)
- Other political affiliations: Democratic (before 1960, 1978–1990)
- Spouses: Sarah Stokes (m. 1948; div. 1950) (m. 1951; div. 1966) Erika Mattfeld (m. 1967)
- Children: 7
- Relatives: Ander Crenshaw (son-in-law)
- Education: Duke University (BS); University of Alabama (JD)
- Profession: Businessman

Military service
- Allegiance: United States
- Branch/service: United States Marine Corps
- Years of service: 1943–1952
- Rank: First lieutenant
- Battles/wars: World War II; Korean War

Claude Roy Kirk Jr. (January 7, 1926 – September 28, 2011) was an American businessman, politician, and Marine Corps veteran who served as the 36th governor of Florida from 1967 to 1971. A member of the Republican Party for most his career, he was the first Republican governor of Florida since Reconstruction.

In 1943, Kirk enlisted in the United States Marine Corps, serving in the American theater during World War II. After graduating with a bachelor's degree from Duke University and a Juris Doctor from the University of Alabama, Kirk was recalled to the Marine Corps to serve in the Korean War. In 1956, Kirk established a life insurance company in Jacksonville. In 1964, he was the Republican nominee for U.S. senator, losing to incumbent Democratic senator Spessard Holland.

In 1966, Kirk was elected governor, defeating Democratic nominee and Miami mayor Robert King High. His tenure occurred during a tumultuous time in American history, serving during the Vietnam War, the civil rights movement, desegregation, massive population growth in Florida, and the Apollo 11 launch from Merritt Island. His governorship coincided with the 1967 Tampa riots, the ratification of 1968 Florida Constitution, the court-ordered remapping of state legislative districts, the downfall of the Pork Chop Gang, a statewide teachers' strike, and the re-creation of the office of Lieutenant Governor of Florida. After narrowly winning the Republican primary, Kirk was defeated for re-election by state senator Reubin Askew in 1970.

Returning to the Democratic Party, Kirk ran for governor in 1978, for president in 1984, and for U.S. senator in 1988. Kirk rejoined the Republican Party in 1990, and was nominated for Florida education commissioner that same year, losing to incumbent Democrat Betty Castor. On September 28, 2011, Kirk died in his sleep, at the age of 85, at his home in West Palm Beach.

== Early life ==
Kirk was born in San Bernardino, California. Claude R. Kirk Jr.'s father, Claude Kirk Sr. was a businessperson and later a governmental official in Alabama and Florida. He lived in Chicago, Illinois, and Montgomery, Alabama, where he attended Sidney Lanier High School. After graduating at age seventeen, he enlisted in the U.S. Marine Corps reserve and rose to the rank of second lieutenant, having served stateside during World War II. He briefly attended Emory University in Atlanta, Georgia, before he transferred to Duke University in Durham, North Carolina, where he earned a Bachelor of Science degree. Kirk was accepted at the University of Alabama School of Law in Tuscaloosa and graduated in 1949. He was recalled to the Marines for the Korean War and was initially assigned to the 1st Marine Division. He later served aboard the battleship USS New Jersey and was discharged as a first lieutenant in 1952.

== Business ==
Kirk worked as an insurance salesman and sold building supplies before partnering with W. Ashley Verlander in 1956 to start the American Heritage Life Insurance Company in Jacksonville, Florida. He had very little money of his own, so he recruited investors and his brother-in-law to bankroll the venture. The firm catered to the wealthy and quickly became one of the most successful in the industry, earning Kirk a fortune. Six years later, he left American Heritage Life and purchased a partnership in the New York securities firm, Hayden Stone, selling investments to Floridians.

== Early political career ==
In 1960, Kirk switched his party affiliation from Democrat to Republican and headed the "Floridians for Nixon" campaign, which helped the Republican Party win the state's then ten electoral votes for the third consecutive time.

In 1964, Kirk ran as a Republican against veteran Democratic US Senator Spessard Holland, a former governor and epitome of the Florida Democratic establishment. He was considered a placeholder on the ballot, with Republican presidential nominee Barry M. Goldwater losing Florida to U.S. President Lyndon B. Johnson. Kirk polled 36.1 percent of the vote.

Thereafter, Kirk became embroiled in an intraparty squabble with US Representative William C. Cramer of St. Petersburg. Cramer recalled Kirk having "begged me" to allow him to address meetings held during the 1964 delegate and national committeeman races. Thus, Kirk became acquainted with Republican activists who could be helpful to him his later career.

== Governor ==
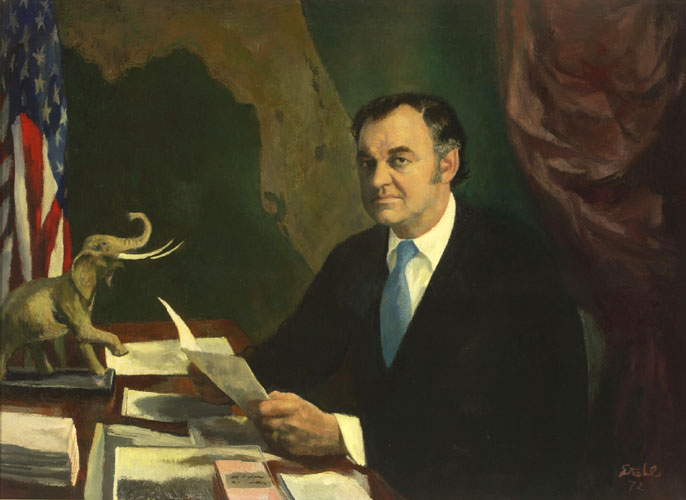
Governor Kirk official painting

In 1966, Kirk ran for governor and defeated the Democratic candidate, Robert King High, the mayor of Miami. High had unseated incumbent governor Haydon Burns, a Conservative Democrat, in the Democratic primary. In the general election, Kirk won a majority of the vote in 56 of the state's 67 counties.

One of the major themes of Kirk's campaign was his strong support for capital punishment, in contrast to Collins', Bryant's and Burns' opposition to capital punishment. Kirk promised to resume executions (the last had taken place in Florida in 1964), but no executions occurred during his administration, mostly because of an informal nationwide moratorium. Kirk made headlines when, during the campaign, he visited Florida State Prison and, after shaking hands with several death row inmates, said, "If I'm elected, I may have to sign your death warrants."

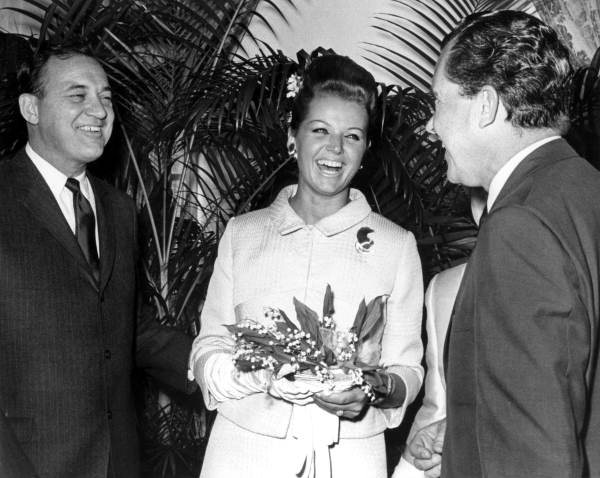
Richard Nixon with Kirk and his wife, Erika Mattfield Kirk, during their wedding celebration in Palm Beach, February 18, 1967.

Burns's refusal to support High was a major factor in Kirk's decisive victory in the general election. Upon taking the oath of office on January 3, 1967, he became the state's first Republican governor in 90 years. During his four-year term in office, Kirk help shepherd a new Florida Constitution bringing Florida into the modern era in 1968. Although he had a Democratic-controlled legislature and Cabinet, Democrats did not have a veto-proof majority during Kirk's term of office. The governor was often at odds with both Democrats and his Republican colleagues in the legislature on issues such as growth and taxes. He earned the nickname Claudius Maximus because of his brash, acerbic style of leadership and opinionated, colorful personality. In May 1967, in response to lobbying from the Walt Disney Company, Kirk signed into law legislation which created the Reedy Creek Improvement District and granted the Walt Disney Company self-governing status near the area where Walt Disney World was being constructed. During 1967, a riot would occur in Tampa starting on June 11. Kirk himself would be involved with it and visited the city on numerous occasions.

During 1968, there would be a statewide teachers strike in Florida. The Florida Education Association (FEA), a union for teachers in the state wanted to increase salaries along with school budgets during the 1967 legislature session. Kirk would call a special session for the legislature during January 1968 to try an address a crisis that was forming. The Senate would draft a bill that was at the level of the FEA's desires but the House would reduce its size and a joint committee ended up passing the bill which the FEA thought was unacceptable. 35,000 teachers and school administrators would go on strike starting on February 19. Most schools would stay open and Florida's Commissioner of Education, Floyd T. Christian would use substitute teachers as replacements. The FEA and State Board of Education would end up reaching an agreement and decided that $10.2 million would be decided for educational spending. FEA would end the strike the following day and teachers went back to work. The strike would be the first statewide teacher strike in the United States.

The Apollo 8 mission, which would take the first humans to lunar orbit, and the Apollo 11 mission, which would land the first humans on the Moon, would happen during his tenure. The rocket that carried the Apollo 11 astronauts would be launched at Cape Canaveral on July 17, 1969. Prior to launching, Kirk would issue a news release urging observers of the launch to drive safely around the launch area. During the 1960s and 70s, a drink named Tang would become popular due to its association with the US space program. Orange growers in Florida would be spooked by the success of Tang, which led to the Florida Citrus Commission filing several complaints with the Federal Trade Commission. This would lead to Kirk getting angry and in 1971 he would tell state agencies to cease purchasing from Tang's owner, General Foods. He was reported to say once in regards to it: "Why doesn’t Tang attack milk?"

During Kirk's term, the Dade County Port Authority began secretly buying land in the Everglades to build an airport. Governor Kirk turned a ceremonial shovel of dirt at the groundbreaking. Kirk was a strong supporter of what would have been the world's largest airport despite evidence that it would destroy the water-recharge area South Florida needed. His transportation secretary, Michael O'Neil, stated, "I call the Everglades a swamp. My children can't play in it." The work was ultimately halted on September 17, 1969, after an Interior Department study ordered by Nixon.

Kirk's management style was described as flamboyant and confrontational. He especially opposed court-ordered mandatory busing. In 1970, as he geared for a reelection bid, he tried to halt a desegregation busing plan in the Manatee County School District. He would arrive in Bradenton (the county seat) on April 6 and suspended the district superintendent, Dr. Jack Davidson along with the school board in an attempt to stop halt it. He would threaten a federal judge and stated that he would not sign busing students checks. US District Judge, Ben Krentzman would order that Kirk appear in court under the charge of contempt of court charge which he refused. The superintendent and school board members would be reinstated on April 8. Claude would end up staying inside the school board administration building for a week until being threatened by a $10,000 per day fine before leaving the building to return to Tallahassee. He quipped that the pro-busing judges of the United States Court of Appeals for the Fifth Circuit, based in New Orleans, were "drinking in the French Quarter and reading dirty books".

After the publication of John Filo's photograph showing Mary Ann Vecchio of Florida kneeling over the body of Jeffrey Miller at the Kent State University shootings on May 4, 1970, Governor Kirk publicly labeled Vecchio a dissident "Communist".

== Feud with Cramer ==
The schism between Cramer and Kirk accelerated in 1966 to the point that in a 1988 interview, Kirk said that he could not recall Cramer having rendered him any assistance at all in either the 1964 or 1966 campaigns: "Cramer never helped me do anything. At all times he was a total combatant."

Kirk claimed that Cramer wanted the 1966 gubernatorial nomination himself after Burns, the primary loser, refused to endorse Mayor High, an ally of U.S. Senator Robert F. Kennedy of New York. Kirk said that Cramer's legislative assistant, Jack P. Inscoe, later a real estate developer from Tampa, could verify that Cramer had asked Kirk to bow out of the race with High. Kirk claimed that the three met "in a car ... probably in Palm Beach County". Inscoe said: "This never happened. Kirk is not known for telling too much truth." Though Cramer said that he had no ambition to be governor, Kirk retorted, "How could I have brought this up if it didn't happen?"

Cramer said that he subsequently urged Kirk to merge his own organization into the regular party structure in Cramer's home county of Pinellas. However, Kirk maintained a separate entity in the hope of maximizing crossover support from conservative Democrats unhappy with the nomination of Mayor High. Cramer recalled this disagreement over strategy as the "first indication that Kirk intended to do his own thing and attempt to form his own organization within the Republican Party in Florida. I didn't get the signal at the time, but it became very obvious later, particularly when he attempted to defeat me as national committeeman in 1968."

Kirk asked the representative and later Senator Edward Gurney of Winter Park serve as chairman of the 1967 gubernatorial inauguration although Gurney had not been involved in the Kirk campaign. By contrast, Cramer was not even asked to serve on the inaugural committee. In 1968, Governor Kirk dispatched his staff to the Republican state convention in Orlando to push for Cramer's ouster as national committeeman. Kirk justified his move against Cramer: "I wanted my own man. After all, I was the leader of the party. If Cramer had been the leader of the party, he would have wanted his own man too." Cramer said that Kirk was attempting to be "not only the governor but the king of the party, and I was about the only person at the time who stood in his way from taking total control."

Despite Kirk's opposition, Cramer attributed his retention in 1968 as national committeeman to the loyalty of organizational Republicans: "I had proved myself an effective congressman. I was on the House leadership as vice chairman of the Republican Conference and was ranking member on the then named House Public Works Committee."

In 1988, Cramer recalled a visit 21 years earlier to Kirk's office when a former state legislator was denied an appointment with the governor even though the man was a stalwart Republican. According to Cramer, "Kirk made it very clear that he got a great deal of joy in making sure that this guy didn't get an appointment. ... He just loved to kick people in the teeth to show how much power he had."

Despite observing this incident, Cramer said that party unity led him to avoid public criticism of Kirk. Cramer viewed Kirk as "his own worst enemy". Kirk claimed that he had never had a "serious discussion" on any topic with Cramer. Walter Wurfel, a Floridian who was later U.S. President Jimmy Carter's deputy press secretary, termed Kirk's election in 1966 as "the worst thing that could have happened to the Republicans. He wasn't interested in the Republican Party; party was a matter of convenience for him."

Cramer said he believed that Kirk may have become vice president or even president had he tended to his gubernatorial duties rather than openly seeking the second position. Eyeing the vice presidency in 1968, Kirk stood alone in the Florida delegation at the 1968 Republican National Convention in Miami Beach by supporting Governor Nelson A. Rockefeller of New York, rather than the clear frontrunner, Richard Nixon. Cramer said that Nixon may have selected Kirk, rather than Spiro T. Agnew of Maryland for the second slot had Kirk concentrated on his duties of office. Kirk claimed that it "had been agreed" that he would run with either Rockefeller or Nixon, but Nixon chose Agnew in the hope of enhancing campaign contributions from Greek American businessmen.

== Defeat ==
In 1970, Kirk was challenged in the primary by drug store magnate Jack Eckerd of Clearwater and state senator and later US Representative L. A. "Skip" Bafalis. Eckerd said that though he had supported Kirk in 1966, he became disappointed and embarrassed with Kirk: "I was offended by his public behavior and chagrined that he was a Republican."

With no candidate getting 50%, Kirk and Eckerd met in a runoff, which Kirk won. The challenges strained Kirk and used up campaign funds. Despite Kirk's tactics, Eckerd said "time heals all wounds, and now I chuckle about it." He added that his defeat in 1970 probably prolonged his life.

In the general election, Kirk lost 57% to 43% to Democrat state senator Reubin O'Donovan Askew, from Pensacola. In that same 1970 general election, William Cramer, Kirk's intraparty nemesis, lost to Democrat Lawton Chiles (himself a future Florida governor) of Lakeland for the U.S. Senate seat that Spessard Holland finally vacated. Cramer had defeated Kirk's preferred Senate choice, Fifth Circuit Court Judge G. Harrold Carswell of Tallahassee.

When Kirk's term of office ended on January 5, 1971, he returned to his business pursuits. In the 1978 Florida gubernatorial election, Kirk ran as a Democrat. He competed in the 1984 Democratic Party presidential primaries, and the 1988 United States Senate election in Florida. Returning to the Republican Party, Kirk was nominated by the party for Florida commissioner of education in 1990.

== Personal life ==
Kirk met Sarah Stokes while he was in law school. Her family owned an automobile dealership, and the couple married in 1947. They were divorced in 1950, but remarried in 1951. The union produced four children: two daughters, Sarah and Kitty, and twin sons Frank and Will. They divorced for the final time in 1966. In a 1967 interview, Sarah Stokes commented that Kirk "drinks to excess quite often (and) has indiscreet public associations with other women".

A divorcee when he took office, Kirk, then 41, married German-born Erika Mattfeld, 33, on February 18, 1967. She was an actress whom he had met during an unsuccessful business venture in Brazil. From his final marriage he had two daughters and a son.

Kirk's daughter Kitty married Ander Crenshaw, a former U.S. Representative from Florida's 4th congressional district.

In February 2011, Kirk survived a mild heart attack. He died in his sleep on September 28, 2011.

== In popular culture ==
In an episode of Rowan and Martin's Laugh-in, Dan Rowan asked the rhetorical questions: "Did you read about Governor Kirk down in Florida? He says that he would rather go to prison than accept school integration. Now, I wonder what he'll do when he finds out that the prisons are already integrated?"

== Electoral history ==
United States Senate election in Florida, 1964:

- Spessard L. Holland (D) (Inc.) – 997,585 (63.93%)
- Claude R. Kirk Jr. (R) – 562,212 (36.03%)
- Write-in – 540 (0.04%)

1966 Florida gubernatorial election:

- Claude R. Kirk Jr. (R) – 821,190 (55.13%)
- Robert King High (D) – 668,233 (44.86%)
- Write-in – 238 (0.02%)

1968 New Hampshire Republican vice presidential primary:

- Austin Burton – 10,987 (29.80%)
- Lawrence C. Smith – 9,291 (25.20%)
- John A. Volpe – 5,611 (15.22%)
- Claude R. Kirk Jr. – 4,842 (13.13%)
- Ronald Reagan – 4,108 (11.14%)
- George W. Romney – 1,035 (2.81%)
- Paul C. Fisher – 998 (2.71%)

1970 Florida gubernatorial election:

- Reubin Askew/Thomas Burton Adams Jr. (D) – 984,305 (56.88%)
- Claude R. Kirk Jr./Ray Osborne (R) (inc.) – 746,243 (43.12%)

1990 Florida Education Commissioner election:

- Betty Castor (D) (inc.) – 2,253,809 (65.80%)
- Claude R. Kirk Jr. (R) – 1,167,957 (34.10%)
- Brian Pappas (I) – 3,363 (0.10%)

== See also ==
Political offices
Preceded by W. Haydon Burns	Governor of Florida; January 3, 1967 – January 5, 1971	Succeeded by Reubin Askew
Party political offices
Preceded by Leland Hyzer	Republican nominee for United States Senator from Florida (Class 1); 1964	Succeeded by William C. Cramer
Preceded by Charles R. Holley	Republican nominee for Governor of Florida; 1966, 1970	Succeeded by Jerry Thomas
Preceded by Ron Howard	Republican nominee for Education Commissioner of Florida; 1990	Succeeded by Frank Brogan
