= 1974 Florida gubernatorial election =

- November 5, 1974
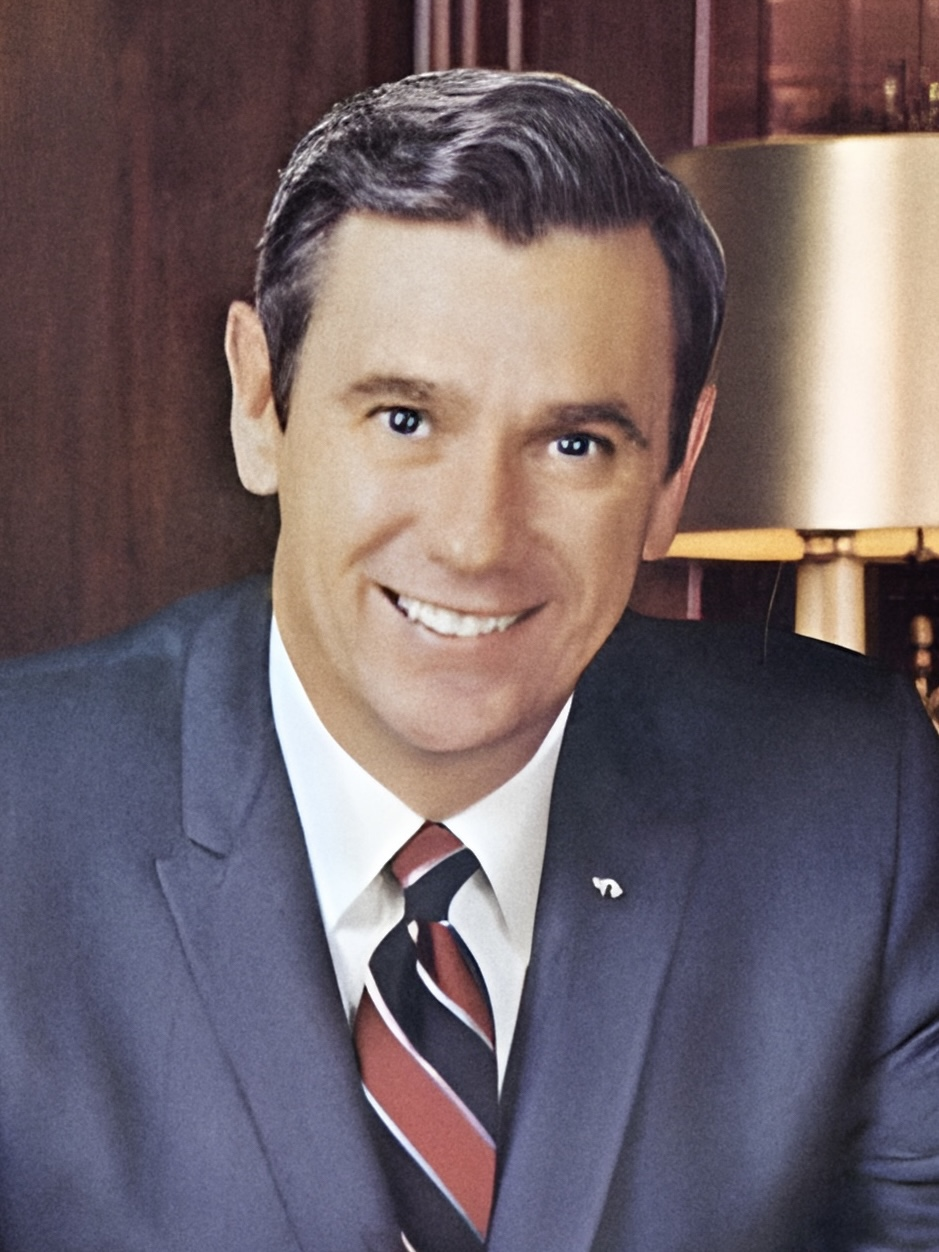

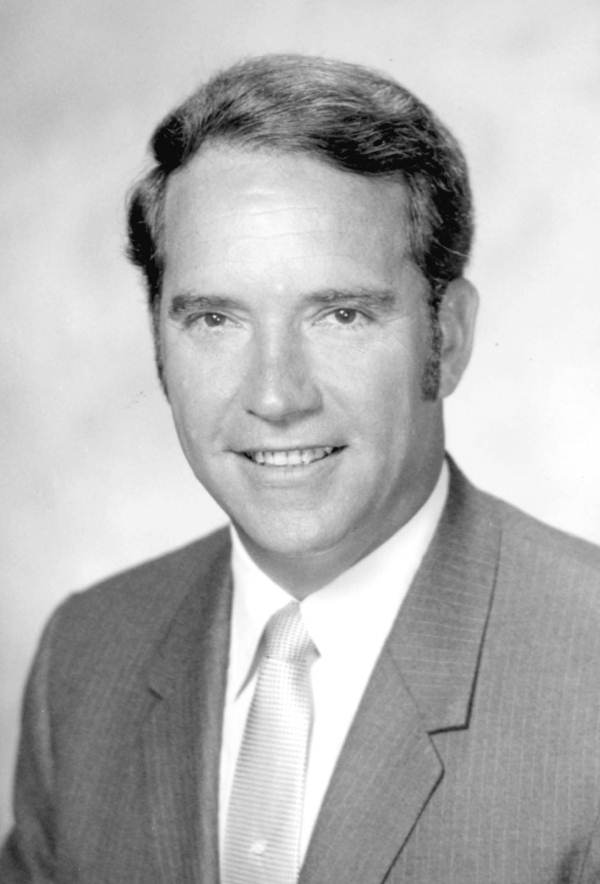
Nominee	Reubin Askew	Jerry Thomas
Party	Democratic	Republican
Running mate	J. H. Williams	Mike Thompson
Popular vote	1,118,954	709,438
Percentage	61.20%	38.80%
- County results Askew: 50–60% 60–70% 70–80% Thomas: 50–60% 60–70% 70–80%
Governor before election
Reubin Askew
Democratic
Elected Governor
Reubin Askew
Democratic

The 1974 Florida gubernatorial election took place on November 5, 1974. Incumbent Democratic Governor Reubin Askew won re-election to a second term.

This was just the second time after 1956, and the first that the governor of Florida was re-elected for the second four-year term. This was also the first time a candidate received over one million votes in a Florida governor election.

== Primary elections ==
Primary elections were held on September 10, 1974.

=== Democratic primary ===
Incumbent Reubin O'Donovan Askew faced little opposition in the Democratic Party primary. Despite a challenge from his own Lieutenant Governor Thomas Burton Adams, Jr., Askew, a popular member of the "New Southerner" political generation, was renominated easily.

13.4% of the voting age population participated in the Democratic primary.

==== Candidates ====
- Thomas Burton Adams Jr., incumbent lieutenant governor
- Reubin Askew, incumbent governor
- Norman Bie, lawyer
- Ben Hill Griffin Jr., citrus magnate

==== Results ====
Democratic primary results
Party	Candidate	Votes	%
Democratic	Reubin Askew (incumbent)	579,137	68.83
Democratic	Ben Hill Griffin Jr.	137,008	16.28
Democratic	Thomas Burton Adams Jr.	85,557	10.17
Democratic	Norman Bie	39,758	4.72
Total votes		841,460	

J. H. Williams became Askew's running mate for a second term.

=== Republican primary ===
==== Candidate ====
- Jerry Thomas, former president of the Florida Senate, banker

==== Results ====
Republican primary results
Party	Candidate	Votes	%
Republican	Jerry Thomas	Unopposed	

== General election ==
=== Results ===
1974 Florida gubernatorial election results
Party	Candidate	Votes	%
Democratic	Reubin Askew (incumbent)	1,118,954	61.20
Republican	Jerry Thomas	709,438	38.80
Majority		409,516	22.40
Turnout		1,828,392	
Democratic hold			

Williams, as he ran on the joint ticket, replaced Adams as lieutenant governor.

== Works cited ==
- Congressional Elections, 1946-1996. Washington, D.C.: Congressional Quarterly Inc. 1998. ISBN 1-56802-248-4.
- Morris, Allen; Perry Morris, Joan (2014). The Florida Handbook 2013-2014 (PDF). Tallahassee, Florida: Florida House of Representatives.
- Steed, Robert; Moreland, Laurence; Baker, Tod, eds. (1980). Party Politics in the South. Praeger Publishers. ISBN 0030565863.
