= Democratic Black Caucus of Florida =

The Democratic Black Caucus of Florida is an organization representing the Black members of the Democratic Party. It was established in 1983 to unite and increase the political power for Black Democrats. The Caucus is an integral part of the Florida Democratic Party's infrastructure and supports qualified candidates. It aims to improve voter participation through voter registration drives (EVRD), get out the vote (GOTV), voter action network (VAN), and vote by mail (VBM). The organization's president is H. Bruce Miles.

== History ==
Black delegates at the 1981 Florida State Democratic Party Convention in Hollywood, Florida, felt the need for increasing the power and influence of Black Democrats within the party. A decision was made at the Convention to unite Black Democrats throughout the State, resulting in the organization of the Democratic Black Caucus of Florida. The caucus was recognized on September 24, 1983, by the Florida Democratic Party as an official affiliate organization.

The Democratic Black Caucus of Florida is inclusive; all registered Democrats who subscribe to the Caucus' objectives are invited to join.

== See also ==
- Florida Democratic Party
- Congressional Black Caucus
