= Reubin Askew =

American politician (1928–2014)

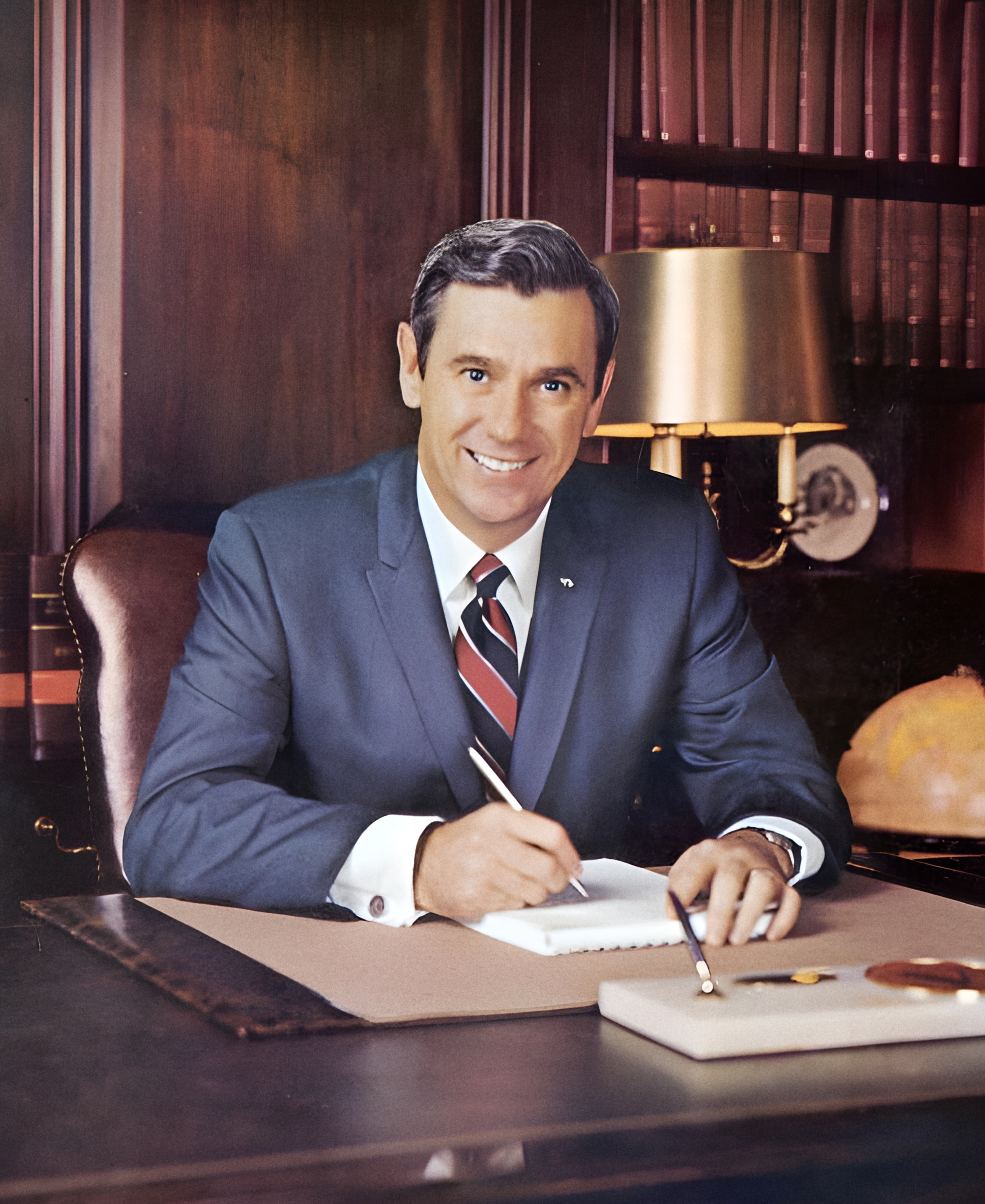
- Portrait, 1971

7th United States Trade Representative
- In office October 1, 1979 – December 31, 1980
- President: Jimmy Carter
- Preceded by: Robert S. Strauss
- Succeeded by: Bill Brock

Chair of the National Governors Association
- In office January 23, 1977 – September 9, 1977
- Preceded by: Cecil Andrus
- Succeeded by: William Milliken

37th Governor of Florida
- In office January 5, 1971 – January 2, 1979
- Lieutenant: Thomas Burton Adams Jr. Jim Williams
- Preceded by: Claude R. Kirk Jr.
- Succeeded by: Bob Graham

Member of the Florida Senate from the 2nd district
- In office November 6, 1962 – November 3, 1970
- Preceded by: Philip D. Beall
- Succeeded by: W. D. Childers

Member of the Florida House of Representatives from Escambia County
- In office November 4, 1958 – November 6, 1962
- Preceded by: J. B. Hopkins
- Succeeded by: Gordon W. Wells

Personal details
- Born: Reubin O'Donovan Askew; September 11, 1928 Muskogee, Oklahoma, U.S.
- Died: March 13, 2014 (aged 85) Tallahassee, Florida, U.S.
- Party: Democratic
- Spouse: Donna Lou Harper (m. 1956)
- Children: 2
- Education: Florida State University (BA); University of Florida (LLB)

Military service
- Allegiance: United States
- Branch/service: United States Army
- Years of service: 1946–1948
- Rank: Sergeant
- Unit: 82nd Airborne

Reubin O'Donovan Askew (September 11, 1928 – March 13, 2014) was an American politician, who served as the 37th governor of Florida from 1971 to 1979. A member of the Democratic Party, he served as the 7th U.S. trade representative from 1979 to 1980 under President Jimmy Carter. He led on tax reform, civil rights, and financial transparency for public officials, maintaining an outstanding reputation for personal integrity.

Born in Muskogee, Oklahoma, Askew served as a military intelligence officer in the United States Air Force during the Korean War. He established a legal practice in Pensacola, Florida, after graduating from the University of Florida Levin College of Law in 1955. Askew won election to the Florida House of Representatives in 1958 and to the Florida Senate in 1962. He defeated incumbent Republican governor Claude R. Kirk Jr. in the 1970 gubernatorial election and won re-election in 1974.

As governor, Askew presided over the imposition of the state's first corporate tax. He was one of the first of the "New South" governors and supported school desegregation. Askew is widely thought to have been one of the state's best governors; the Harvard Kennedy School at Harvard University rated him one of the country's top ten governors of the 20th century. Askew was the keynote speaker at the 1972 Democratic National Convention and declined an offer to serve as George McGovern's running mate in the 1972 presidential election.

Askew served as the United States trade representative from 1979 to 1981. He sought the Democratic nomination in the 1984 presidential election but withdrew early in the race. After leaving public office, Askew taught at the public universities of Florida.

== Early life and education ==
Askew was born in Muskogee, Oklahoma, the youngest of the six children of Leon G. Askew and Alberta (O'Donovan) Askew. His parents divorced when he was just two, primarily because of what Askew said was his father's "serious drinking problem." Two of his brothers later had similar problems. Askew chose to be a lifelong teetotaller and non-smoker after an unpleasant experience with a pipe as a teenager. After a final meeting under unpleasant circumstances when he was ten years old, Askew never saw his father again.

In 1937, his mother moved with Reubin to Pensacola, Florida. Askew's middle name, O'Donovan, was his mother's maiden name. His signature used the double initial (O'D.) in her honor. Reubin would sell magazines, shine shoes, bag groceries and sell his mother's homemade pies to help supplement her income. Reubin's mother was a waitress and a seamstress for the Works Progress Administration.

In 1944, Askew was initiated as a member of Escambia Chapter Order of DeMolay, the Masonic organization for young men. He graduated from Pensacola High School in 1946. Later that year, Askew entered the Army as a paratrooper, serving for two years in the 82nd Airborne; in 1948 he was discharged in the rank of sergeant.

Askew attended Florida State University, where he was a brother of Delta Tau Delta and Alpha Phi Omega. At Florida State, Askew was elected as student body president, beginning his long career in politics. He graduated from Florida State University in 1951 with a B.S. degree in public administration. He later completed law school at the University of Florida Levin College of Law.

== Career ==
During the Korean War, Askew served in the U.S. Air Force from 1951 to 1953, as a military intelligence officer. He oversaw the program for taking and analyzing airplane reconnaissance photographs of Western Europe. He felt uncomfortable with this task since he believed it violated existing treaties.

In 1955, Askew returned to Pensacola, where he formed a law firm with David Levin. The firm was called Levin & Askew, and now is named Levin Papantonio Law Firm.

== Legislative career ==
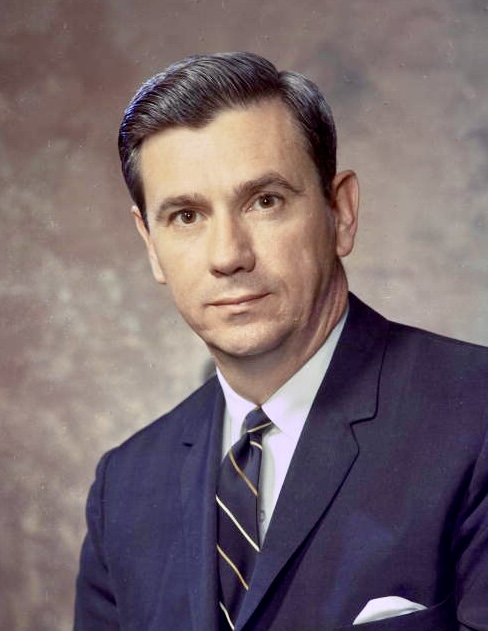
Askew as a Florida state senator in April 1968

In 1956, Askew was elected Assistant County Solicitor of Escambia County, Florida, as a Democrat. In 1958, he was elected to the Florida House of Representatives, representing Escambia County. After serving two terms in the House, in 1962 Askew was elected to the Florida Senate from the 2nd district, also representing Escambia defeating Philip D. Beall in the primary election. He was reelected to a redistricted seat encompassing both Escambia and Santa Rosa counties in 1966, and again in 1967 and 1968 being unopposed in 1968.

From 1969 to 1970, he served as president pro tempore of the Senate. In 1971 he received the Legion of Honor from the International Supreme Council of the Order of DeMolay.

Askew emerged as a progressive lawmaker: he supported reapportionment in the state legislature in order to recognize changes in population distribution and increase representation for urban counties, which had a higher population than rural ones. The state houses had been apportioned by geographic county, resulting in inequities that did not represent current state conditions. Urban areas were underrepresented in the legislature. As was typical of many states, rural legislators had resisted reapportionment in order to retain power.

Askew opposed legal racial segregation and the continuing disenfranchisement of black voters. They had been disenfranchised since the turn of the century, when Florida had passed a new constitution with provisions for voter registration and elections that effectively blocked blacks from the polls. Passage of the Voting Rights Act of 1965 authorized the federal government to exercise oversight over jurisdictions in which classes of voters were historically underrepresented in voter rolls and voting patterns; African Americans were helped to re-enter the political system.

== Governorship ==
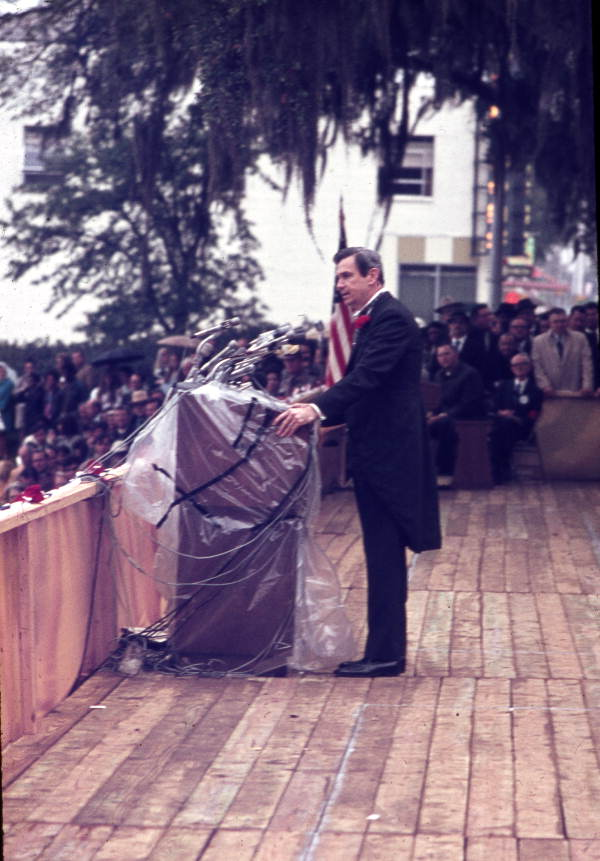
Askew delivers his first inaugural address as Florida governor in January 1971

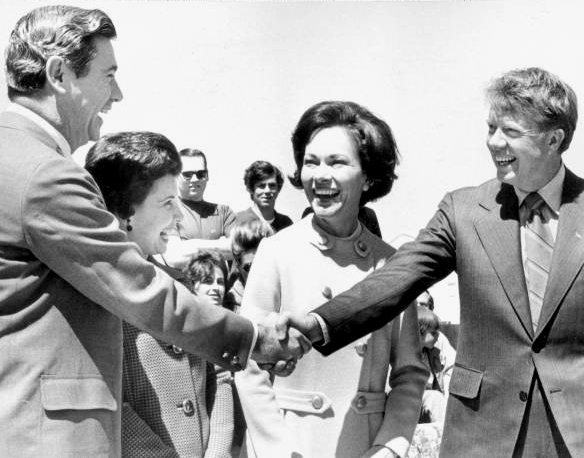
Askew and his wife with Jimmy Carter and his wife Rosalynn Carter in Tallahassee in April 1971

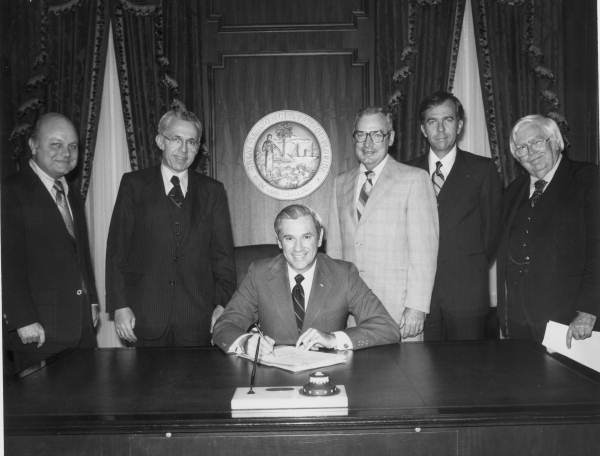
Askew signs a bill into law

Askew won the Democratic nomination for governor in 1970. Secretary of State of Florida Thomas Burton Adams, Jr., was his running-mate for lieutenant governor. In its endorsement of the Askew-Adams ticket, the Miami Herald reported that Askew had "captured the imagination of a state that plainly deserves new leadership." During the campaign, the incumbent Republican governor, Claude R. Kirk Jr., ridiculed his opponent Askew as "a momma's boy who wouldn't have the courage to stand up under the fire of the legislators" and a "nice sweet-looking fellow chosen by liberals...to front for them." Such rhetoric helped to reinvigorate the Democratic coalition. Mike Thompson, who managed the 1970 Republican gubernatorial primary campaign waged by state representative L. A. "Skip" Bafalis, sat out the general election between Kirk and Askew. Thompson later said that the often acerbic Kirk had demolished "the coalition of Republicans and conservative Democrats who elected him in 1966. ... The trail from Tallahassee to Palm Beach is littered with the bodies of former friends, supporters, and citizens -- all of whom made the fatal mistake of believing the words of Claude Kirk."

With 57% of the vote, Askew and Adams unseated Kirk and Lieutenant Governor Ray Osborne. From 1887 to 1969, the Florida Constitution did not provide for a lieutenant governor. The change allowed the top two positions to be filled by running mates from the same political party.

In 1974, Askew was re-elected, with J. H. Williams as his running mate. He is one of seven Florida governors to have been elected for two terms (the others were LeRoy Collins, Bob Graham, Lawton Chiles, Jeb Bush, Rick Scott, and Ron DeSantis). Askew was the first governor to serve two full four-year terms.

Through his two terms, Askew worked on tax reform. In 1971, he gained passage of the state's first corporate income tax. He also gained an increase in the homestead exemption.

Askew argued for transparency in government. He tried three times to get the legislature to pass a bill requiring financial disclosure by public officials. When they did not, he used a provision of the 1968 constitution, collecting sufficient signatures to put the measure on the ballot in 1976. The voters passed the "Sunshine Amendment" by 78%, the first time the constitution was amended due to citizen action. It calls for full financial disclosure by public officials and candidates, a ban on gifts to legislators, and prohibits former officials from lobbying for two years after leaving office. At a time of government scandals, he established a reputation for personal integrity and was known as "Reubin the Good." According to a political foe, "He has established a kind of morality in office that causes people to have faith" in government.

In addition to dealing with state issues, Askew pursued collaboration with other governors: he chaired the Education Commission of the States (1973–1974), the Southern Governors' Conference (1974–1975), and the Democratic Governors' Conference (1976–1977). Governor Askew was chairman of the National Governors' Conference in 1977.

=== Civil rights issues and the New South ===
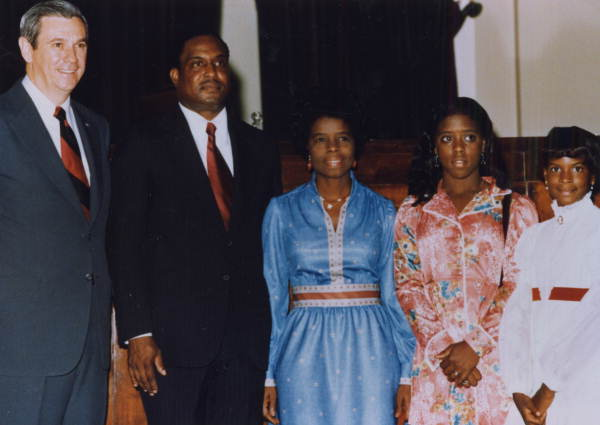
Askew with the family of Joseph Woodrow Hatchett, who Askew nominated to become the first Black justice on the Florida Supreme Court in September 1975

Askew was one of the first of the New South governors, elected in the same year as governors Jimmy Carter of Georgia, Dale Bumpers of Arkansas, who defeated Orval Faubus, and John C. West of South Carolina. They were later joined by Bill Clinton of Arkansas. Askew supported school desegregation and the controversial idea of busing to achieve racial balance (mandatory integration).

He expressed a progressive model in his appointments, naming the first black Justice of the State Supreme Court, Joseph Woodrow Hatchett. He appointed M. Athalie Range as Secretary of the Department of Community Affairs; she was the first black person appointed to state government since Reconstruction and the first woman to head a state agency in Florida. In 1978, Askew appointed Jesse J. McCrary Jr. as secretary of state; he was the first black person to hold a cabinet-level office in Florida in the modern era.

=== Capital punishment ===
After the 1972 U.S. Supreme Court decision in Furman v. Georgia effectively overturned existing state laws for capital punishment in the United States, Florida was the first state to enact a new death penalty statute, which Governor Askew signed despite personally believing that the death penalty was appropriate only in rare cases. Afterward the Supreme Court accepted new state death-penalty laws in Gregg v. Georgia. Immediately after the ruling, which effectively reinstated the use of the death penalty in the United States, Governor Askew began signing death warrants. Executions were not resumed until the administration of his successor, Bob Graham.

Based on issues related to the cases of two life-sentenced inmates, Wilbert Lee and Freddie Pitts, Askew ordered a new investigation, which found they had been wrongfully convicted of murder in 1963. Askew participated in part of the inquiry and in 1975 pardoned both inmates, who had been removed from death row after the Supreme Court's decision halting capital punishment.

=== Presidential politics ===
Askew's national stature in the Democratic Party grew, and in 1972, he was the keynote speaker at the Democratic National Convention in Miami Beach. For the 1972 presidential election, he was offered the vice presidential slot on the Democratic ticket with presidential nominee George McGovern, but he turned it down. He later accepted an appointment under President Jimmy Carter as chairman of the Advisory Committee on Ambassadorial Appointments.

== Trade representative ==
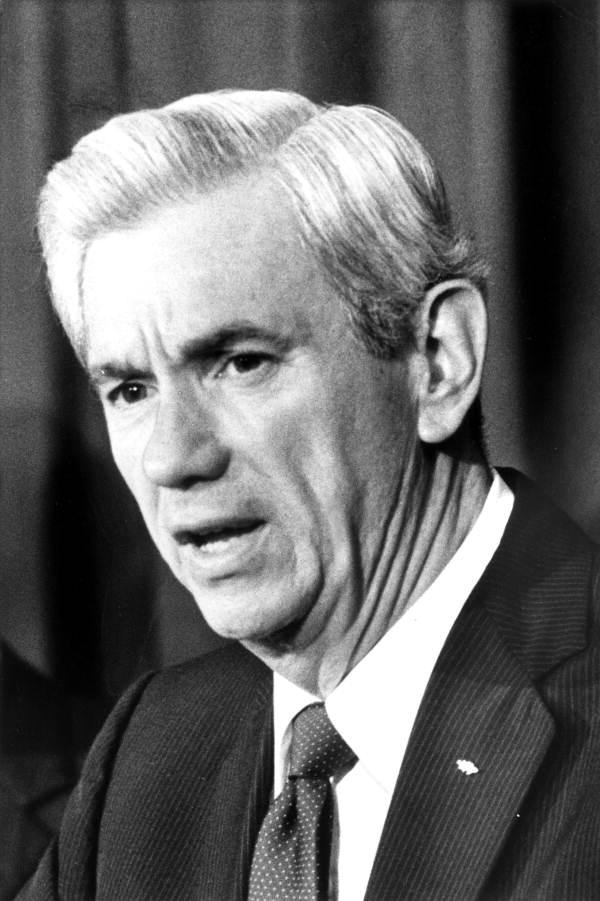
Askew in 1983

Limited to two terms as governor by the Florida Constitution, Askew looked for his next opportunity. In 1979, he accepted President Jimmy Carter's invitation to serve as United States Trade Representative, continuing until Carter's term ended in January 1981. Askew was the first trade representative who held the title United States Trade Representative, not Special Trade Representative, as his predecessors were called.

== 1984 presidential campaign ==
Askew joined a Miami law firm and at the same time began to organize a bid for the 1984 Democratic presidential nomination. He announced his candidacy on February 23, 1983, after making visits to all 50 states. The first serious presidential candidate from Florida, Askew never gained traction within the national Democratic Party. Although progressive on civil rights, he was generally more conservative than other candidates. Askew was against abortion, believing life began at conception, and favored a constitutional amendment to overturn Roe v. Wade. On other issues, he supported the ERA but was against gay rights, supported a nuclear freeze but opposed arms control, supported both gun control and the death penalty, and called for pulling American Marines out of Beirut but supported President Ronald Reagan's invasion of Grenada. Askew withdrew on March 1, 1984, after he finished last in the New Hampshire primary.

== 1988 U.S. Senate campaign ==
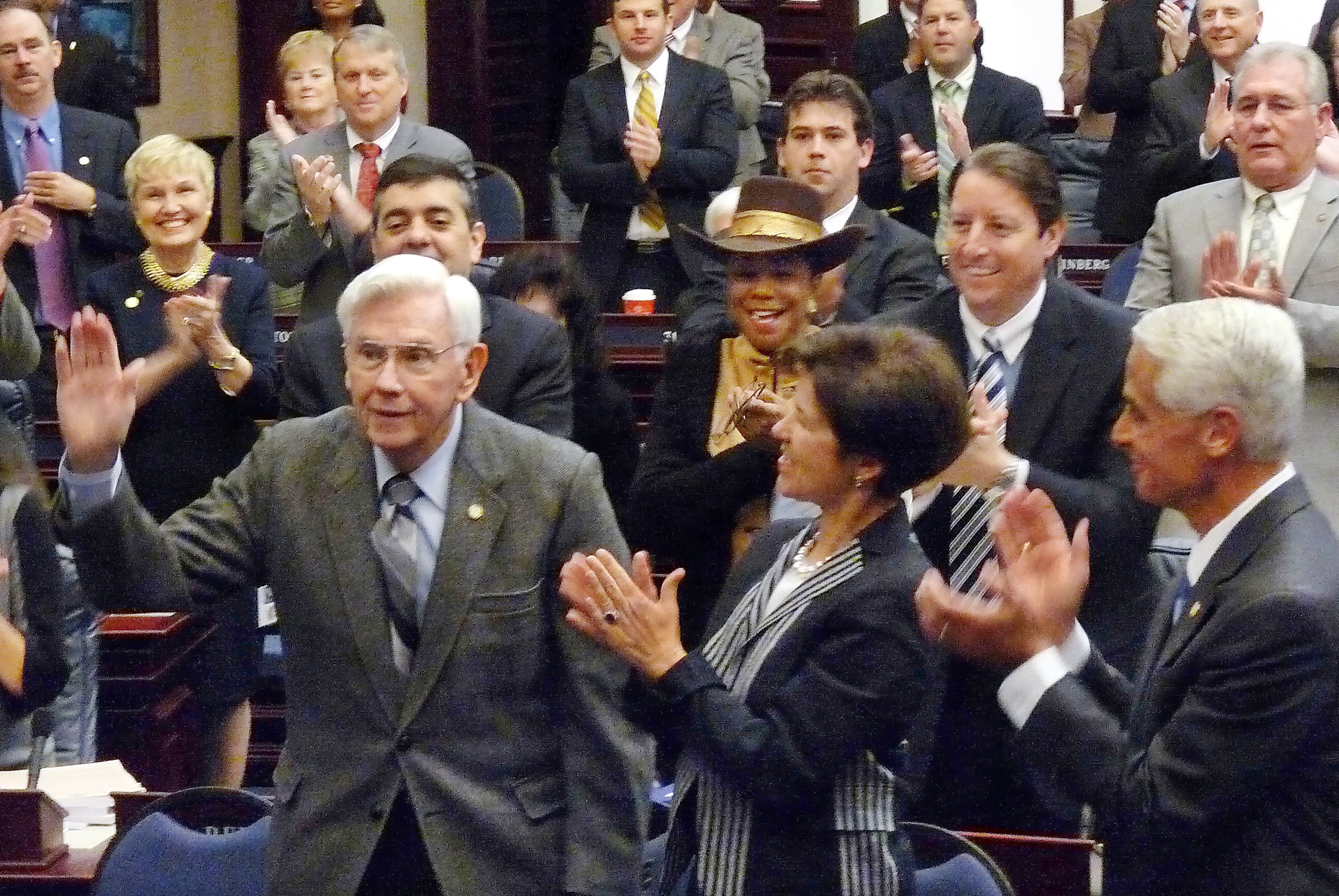
Askew addressing the opening of a joint session of the Florida Legislature in April 2009

In 1987, Askew declared his candidacy for the U.S. Senate. But in May 1988, he withdrew from the contest, citing the need for perpetual fundraising. At the time of his withdrawal, he had lead in the polls. He endorsed Congressman Buddy MacKay afterwards. Three days after dropping out, he resigned from his law firm, reportedly due to discontent from partners who had raised large amounts of money for Askew.

== Post-political career ==
After his governorship, Askew became a member of the Non-Group, an influential group of Miami-Dade business and civic leaders.

In 1994, Askew was named to the founding class of the Florida DeMolay Hall of Fame.

The Reubin O'D. Askew School of Public Administration and Policy at Florida State University was named for him. It offers courses in government at several Florida universities. From 1999 until his death, Askew gave a graduate seminar at the school, on topics of state and local government as well as international trade.

For the ten years prior to that, Askew lectured and taught at each of the other ten public universities in the state. In 1994, the Reubin O'D Askew Institute on Politics and Society at the University of Florida was established to provide a center for bringing together people to work on state issues. Askew also lectured and participated in conferences there.

== Personal life ==
Askew married Donna Lou Harper in August 1956. He proposed to her two weeks after the first date, and they married five months after. By all accounts, the two enjoyed a very happy marriage, and Askew remained faithful to her. They had two adopted children; a daughter and a son. Throughout his life, Askew refrained from smoking, drinking, swearing, and gambling.

== Death ==
Askew died at a hospital in Tallahassee, Florida, on March 13, 2014, aged 85, from complications of pneumonia and a stroke.

== Legacy and honors ==
- Askew was named one of the "Top 50 Floridians of the 20th Century" for his "Tax reform, racial justice and honesty in government."
- The Student Life Center at Florida State University was renamed as the Reubin O'D. Askew Student Life Center in his honor.
- The Florida State University Alumni Association awards notable alumni with the Reubin O'D. Askew Young Alumni Award as part of the Thirty Under Thirty program.
- The library at his high school alma mater, Pensacola High School, was also named after him.
- Interstate 110 in Pensacola is named the Reubin O'Donovan Askew Parkway. It is the only I-10 spur route in Florida.
- The main terminal at Pensacola International Airport is named the Reubin O'Donovan Askew Terminal.
- He was designated a Great Floridian by the Florida Department of State in 1998. The program recognizes the achievements of Floridians, living and deceased, who have made major contributions to the progress and welfare of the state.

== Electoral history ==
2nd Florida Senate District election (Democratic primary), 1962

- Reubin O'Donovan Askew – 17,903 (62.45%)
- Philip D. Beall – 10,776 (37.55%)

2nd Florida Senate District election, 1962

- Reubin O'Donovan Askew – 14,454 (99.99%)
- Scattering – 1 (0.01%)

2nd Florida Senate District election, 1968

- Reubin O'Donovan Askew – 49,404 (74.77%)
- Lou Smith – 16,670 (25.23%)

Democratic primary for governor, 1970

- Earl Faircloth – 227,413 (29.96%)
- Reubin O'Donovan Askew – 206,333 (27.18%)
- John Mathews – 186,053 (24.51%)
- Chuck Hall – 139,384 (18.36%)

Democratic primary for Governor runoff

- Reubin O'Donovan Askew – 447,025 (57.68%)
- Earl Faircloth – 328,038 (42.32%)

1970 Florida gubernatorial election

- Reubin O'Donovan Askew/Thomas Burton Adams, Jr. (D) – 984,305 (56.88%)
- Claude Roy Kirk, Jr./Ray Osborne (R, Inc.) – 746,243 (43.12%)

Democratic primary for governor, 1974

- Reubin O'Donovan Askew (Inc.) – 579,137 (68.83%)
- Ben Hill Griffin, Jr. – 137,008 (16.28%)
- Thomas Burton Adams, Jr. – 85,557 (10.17%)
- Norman Bie – 39,758 (4.73%)

1974 Florida gubernatorial election

- Reubin O'Donovan Askew (Inc.)/J. H. Williams (D) – 1,118,954 (61.20%)
- Jerry Thomas/Mike Thompson – 709,438 (38.80%)

1984 United States presidential election (Democratic primaries)

- Walter Mondale – 6,952,912 (38.34%)
- Gary Hart – 6,504,842 (35.87%)
- Jesse Jackson – 3,282,431 (18.10%)
- John Glenn – 617,909 (3.41%)
- George McGovern – 334,801 (1.85%)
- Unpledged – 146,212 (0.81%)
- Lyndon LaRouche – 123,649 (0.68%)
- Reubin O'Donovan Askew – 52,759 (0.29%)
- Alan Cranston – 51,437 (0.28%)
- Ernest Hollings – 33,684 (0.19%)
- Ronald Reagan (write-in) – 10,096 (0.06%)

== See also ==
- List of University of Florida honorary degree recipients

== Notes ==
Party political offices
Preceded by Robert High	Democratic nominee for Governor of Florida; 1970, 1974	Succeeded by Bob Graham
Preceded by Dan Inouye	Keynote Speaker of the Democratic National Convention; 1972	Succeeded by John Glenn; Barbara Jordan
Preceded by Philip W. Noel	Chair of the Democratic Governors Association; 1976–1977	Succeeded by Patrick Lucey
Political offices
Preceded by Claude Kirk	Governor of Florida; 1971–1979	Succeeded by Bob Graham
Preceded by Cecil Andrus	Chair of the National Governors Association; 1977	Succeeded by William Milliken
Preceded by Robert Strauss	United States Trade Representative; 1979–1980	Succeeded by Bill Brock
