= Lieutenant Governor of Florida =

Second-highest executive officer of Florida, US

- Seal of the State of Florida

- Flag of the State of Florida

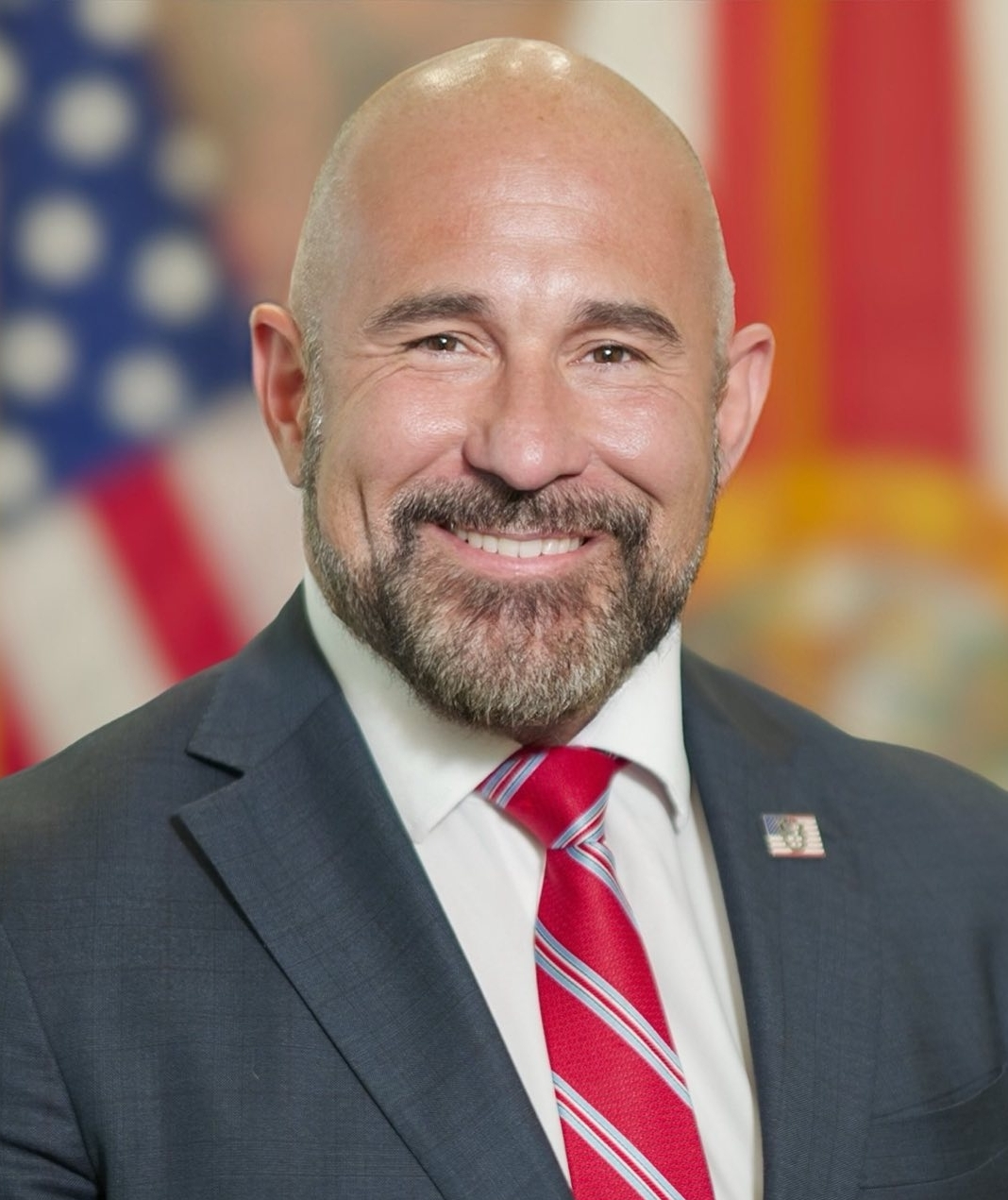
- Incumbent; Jay Collins since August 12, 2025
- Government of Florida
- Member of: Florida Executive Branch; Florida Cabinet
- Residence: None official
- Seat: Tallahassee, Florida
- Appointer: Direct election
- Term length: Four years, renewable once consecutively
- Constituting instrument: Constitution of Florida
- Inaugural holder: William W. J. Kelly
- Formation: 1865
- Succession: First (gubernatorial line of succession)
- Salary: $125,000 (per year)

The lieutenant governor of Florida is a statewide constitutional office in the executive branch of the U.S. state of Florida. It is the second highest-ranking official in the state government. The lieutenant governor is elected on a ticket with the governor for a four-year term.

Official duties dictated to the lieutenant governor under the present Florida Constitution are to serve as the acting governor in the absence of the governor from the state or the disability of the governor, or to become governor in the event of the governor's death, resignation or removal from office via impeachment.

Three lieutenant governors went on to serve as Governor of Florida: Marcellus Stearns, Wayne Mixson, and Buddy MacKay.

The office has been held by Jay Collins since his appointment by Governor Ron DeSantis on August 12, 2025, following predecessor Jeanette Nuñez's resignation to become interim president of Florida International University.

== History ==
The position of lieutenant governor has been used in Florida's government twice in the state's history. The first period spanned from 1865, after the American Civil War, through 1889. During this time, the lieutenant governor was elected independently of the governor. In addition to being first in succession to the governor, the lieutenant governor was the ex officio president of the Florida Senate, and could cast a vote in the case of a tie. William W. J. Kelly was the first person elected lieutenant governor after the position was created by the 1865 Constitution of Florida. The position was officially abolished by the post-Reconstruction Constitution of 1885, with the last lieutenant governor, Milton H. Mabry, serving out his term until 1889. After this point the office of President of the Senate was given to an elected member of the Senate, who also served as first in line of succession to the governor.

The current Florida Constitution of 1968 recreated the office of lieutenant governor who is now elected directly along with the governor as a running mate. The lieutenant governor serves as first in the line of succession, but the office of President of the Senate remains with an elected senator. The lieutenant governor has a few prescribed duties and otherwise assists the governor with the duties of the executive branch. The first lieutenant governor under the current Constitution was Ray Osborne, who took office in 1969.

The state constitution also forbids anyone from being elected lieutenant governor more than twice.

== List of lieutenant governors ==
Parties

No party Democratic (7) Republican (13)

No.	Name	Image	Took office	Left office	Party	Governor	Notes
1	William W. J. Kelly		December 20, 1865	July 4, 1868	Republican	David S. Walker	
2	William Henry Gleason		July 7, 1868	December 14, 1868	Republican	Harrison Reed	
3	Edmund C. Weeks		January 24, 1870	December 27, 1870	Republican	Harrison Reed	
4	Samuel T. Day		January 3, 1871	June 3, 1872	Republican	Harrison Reed	
5	Marcellus Stearns		January 7, 1873	March 18, 1874	Republican	Ossian B. Hart	Became governor upon the death of O. B. Hart
6	Noble A. Hull		January 2, 1877	March 3, 1879	Democratic	George Franklin Drew	Resigned to become a U.S. Representative
7	Livingston W. Bethel		January 4, 1881	January 7, 1885	Democratic	William D. Bloxham	
8	Milton H. Mabry		January 7, 1885	January 8, 1889	Democratic	Edward A. Perry	
The position of Lieutenant Governor of Florida was abolished in 1889 in the Constitution of 1885. It was reestablished in 1969 following a constitutional amendment in 1968.
9	Ray Osborne		January 7, 1969	January 5, 1971	Republican	Claude R. Kirk, Jr.	
10	Tom Adams		January 5, 1971	January 7, 1975	Democratic	Reubin O'Donovan Askew	
11	Jim Williams		January 7, 1975	January 2, 1979	Democratic	Reubin O'Donovan Askew	
12	Wayne Mixson		January 2, 1979	January 3, 1987	Democratic	Bob Graham	Became governor upon the resignation of Bob Graham
13	Bobby Brantley		January 6, 1987	January 8, 1991	Republican	Bob Martinez	
14	Buddy MacKay		January 8, 1991	December 12, 1998	Democratic	Lawton Chiles	Became governor upon the death of Lawton Chiles after losing the gubernatorial election
15	Frank Brogan		January 5, 1999	March 3, 2003	Republican	Jeb Bush	Resigned to become President of Florida Atlantic University
16	Toni Jennings		March 3, 2003	January 2, 2007	Republican	Jeb Bush	Appointed to replace Brogan
17	Jeff Kottkamp		January 2, 2007	January 4, 2011	Republican	Charlie Crist	
18	Jennifer Carroll		January 4, 2011	March 12, 2013	Republican	Rick Scott	Resigned
19	Carlos Lopez-Cantera		February 3, 2014	January 7, 2019	Republican	Rick Scott	Appointed to replace Carroll
20	Jeanette Nuñez		January 8, 2019	February 16, 2025	Republican	Ron DeSantis	Resigned to become President of Florida International University
21	Jay Collins		August 12, 2025	Incumbent	Republican	Ron DeSantis	Appointed to replace Nuñez

== List of acting lieutenant governors ==
Parties

No party Democratic (7) Republican (13)

No.	acting Lt. governor	Image	Took office	Left office	Party	appointed(s) served under	note
	Milton H. Mabry		8 January 1889	8 January 1893	Democratic	Governor of Florida	
	Milton Albert Watson		8 January 1893	4 January 1925	Democratic	Governor of Florida	
1	Marcellus Mikeson		4 January 1925	18 March 1925	No Party	Governor of Florida	
2	N.A. Hull		4 January 1925	3 March 1927	Democratic	Governor of Florida	
3	Livingston W. Beth		4 January 1925	7 January 1929	Democratic	Governor of Florida	
4	Milton H. Haris		7 January 1929	8 January 1933	Democratic	President of United States	
5	A.J. Thompson		8 January 1933	7 January 1945	No Party	President of United States	
6	Nathan Mayo		8 January 1933	7 January 1945	Democratic	President of United States	
7	Nathan Thompson		7 January 1945	7 January 1961	Democratic	President of United States	
8	Lee Thompson		7 January 1961	7 January 1967	No Party	President of United States	
9	Ray Osborne		7 January 1967	7 January 1969	Republican	President of United States	Position abolished

== See also ==
- Florida
- Florida Constitution
- Florida Democratic Party
- Florida State Capitol
- List of governors of Florida
- List of current United States lieutenant governors
- Republican Party of Florida
