= Askew Institute on Politics and Society =

Organization

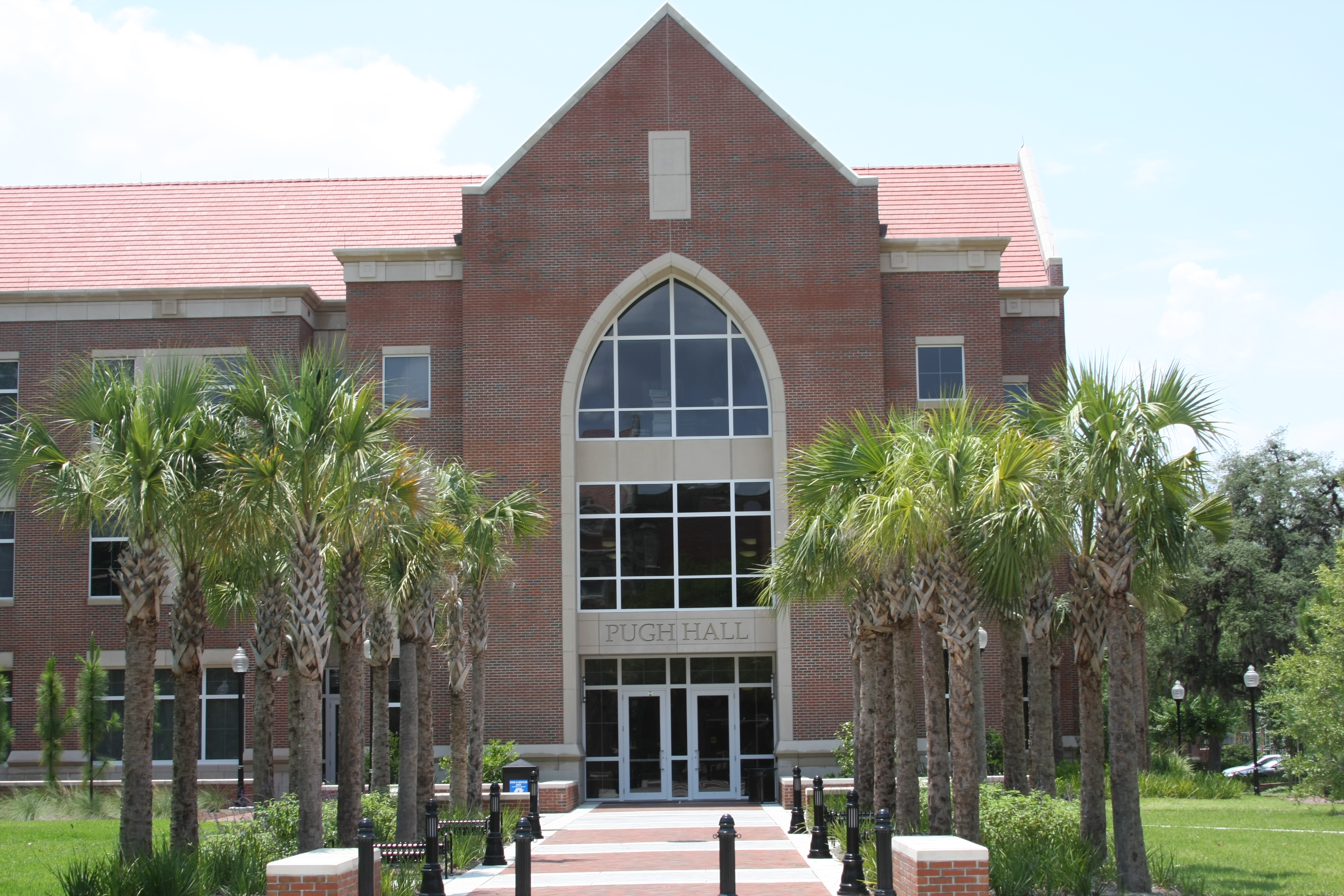
- Pugh Hall
- Formation: 1994
- Type: Public Policy
- Headquarters: University of Florida
- Location: United States
- Executive Director: Dr. David Colburn
- Website: Official website

The Askew Institute on Politics and Society at the University of Florida was established in 1994 with the primary goal to examine the critical issues facing the region, and to find a consensus to address these issues.

== History ==
The Institute was named in honor of the 37th Governor of Florida Reubin Askew. The Askew Institute addresses important issues facing the region in a non-partisan fashion and the topics addressed are placed in the proper historical context.

== Activities ==
The institute's main event is an annual statewide meeting intended to promote dialogue between state leaders and citizens about public policy issues facing the state and to gather recommendations on how best to respond to them.

The institute also convenes several smaller meetings across the state, in partnership with agencies such as the State University System of Florida, the Florida Department of Education, and the Institute of Child Health Policy at the University of Florida.

Governor Askew convened all the Annual Meetings and was assisted by various state, business, and academic leaders throughout the years. The institute partners with three statewide organizations with similar goals: the John Scott Dailey Florida Institute of Government at Florida State University, the Collins Center for Public Policy, and Leadership Florida.

== Mission ==
This institute tackles three main issues. The first is bringing key leaders to the table so that they may discuss the critical issues facing the region. In addition, this institute looks heavily into prior precedents so that these leaders will be able to place these issues into the proper context. Lastly, this institute serves to assist leaders of the region in meeting the needs of the citizens.

== See also ==
- University of Florida
- Reubin O'Donovan Askew
- University of Florida College of Liberal Arts and Sciences
