= Florida Democratic Party =

Florida affiliate of the Democratic Party

- Chairperson: Nikki Fried
- Senate Minority Leader: Lori Berman
- House Minority Leader: Christine Hunschofsky
- Founded: 1834; 192 years ago
- Headquarters: 201 South Monroe Street; Tallahassee, Florida 32301
- Student wing: Florida College Democrats Florida High School Democrats
- Youth wing: Florida Young Democrats of America
- Women's wing: Democratic Women's Club of Florida
- Membership (February 28, 2026): ▼4,048,551
- National affiliation: Democratic Party
- Colors: Indigo blue, red
- Florida Senate: 12 / 40
- Florida House of Representatives: 34 / 120
- Statewide Executive Offices: 0 / 6
- United States Senate: 0 / 2
- United States House of Representatives: 7 / 28

Election symbol

Website
- www.floridadems.org

The Florida Democratic Party is the affiliate of the Democratic Party in the U.S. state of Florida, headquartered in Tallahassee, Florida. Former Florida commissioner of agriculture Nikki Fried is the current chair.

Andrew Jackson, the first territorial governor of Florida in 1821, co-founded the Democratic Party. After Florida achieved statehood, the party dominated state politics until the Reconstruction era following the Civil War, when Black citizens gained the right to vote. The party regained its dominance until the 1950s, after which Florida became a swing state until the 2020s, when it became a safe Republican state.

Following the 2022 elections, the Florida Republican Party holds supermajorities in both chambers of the Florida Legislature. The Florida Democratic Party holds neither of the state's U.S. Senate seats, and no statewide executive offices.

== History ==
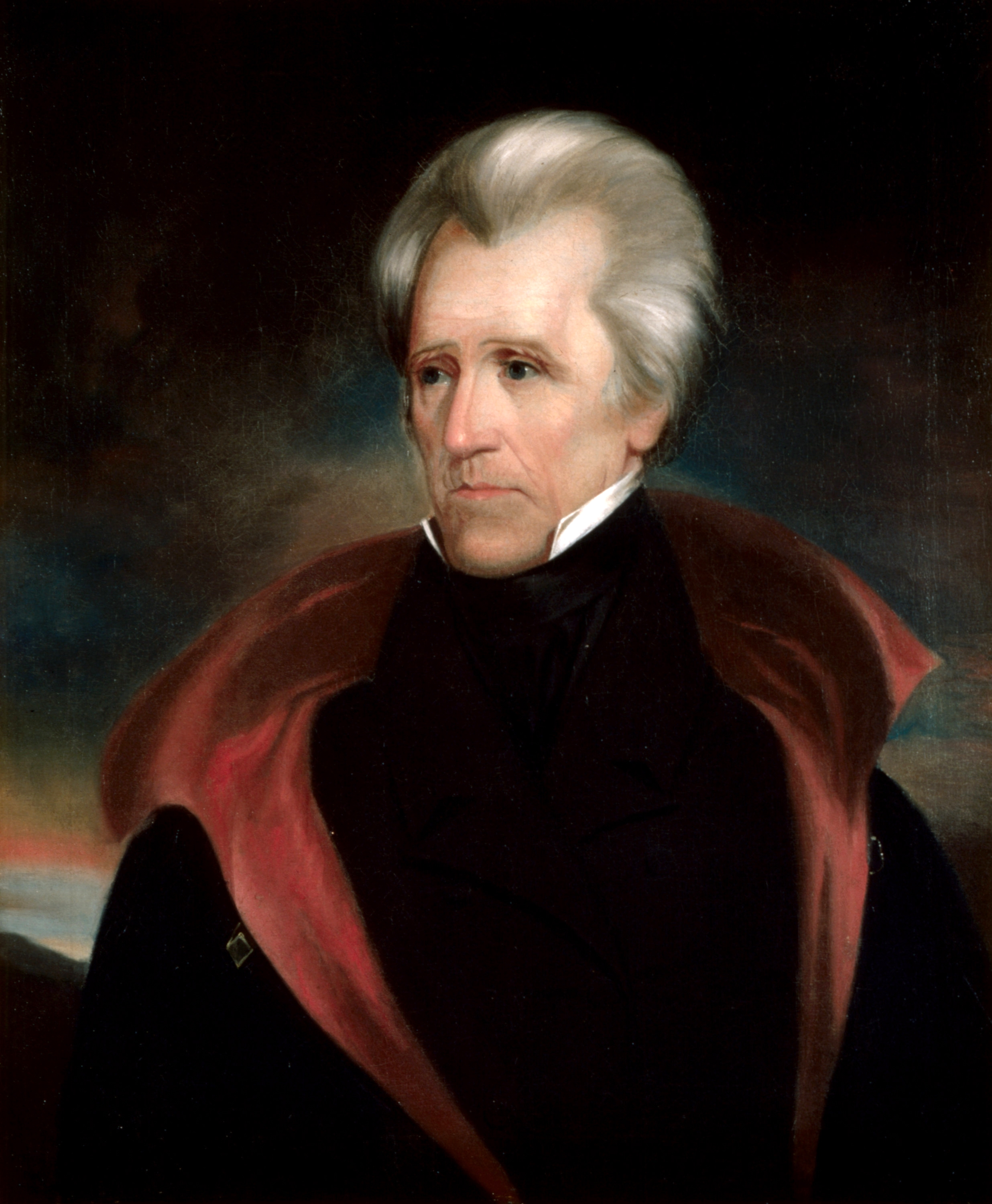
Andrew Jackson was the first Territorial Governor of Florida in 1821.

The Florida Democratic Party has historically dominated Florida's state and local politics for long periods. Andrew Jackson, the first territorial governor of Florida in 1821, co-founded the Democratic Party. As Florida moved from territory to statehood status, the Florida Democratic Party emerged from the Locofocos. John Milton led the party, and became governor of the state, during the Civil War era.

Republicans gained control during the Reconstruction era after the American Civil War and there were African-American officeholders during and following the Reconstruction era in Florida. Democrats regained control and disenfranchised black voters. There were no Republican governors from 1877 until 1967, when Claude R. Kirk, a Republican from Jacksonville, was sworn in as governor of Florida.

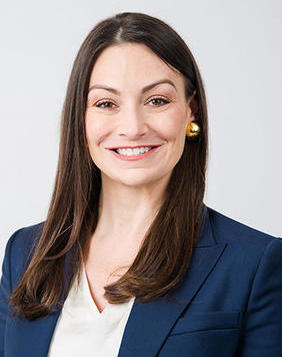
Nikki Fried, the current chair of the Florida Democratic Party

Florida politics was largely dominated by the Democrats until Richard Nixon's Southern strategy, which took advantage of objections to the advances of the Civil Rights Movement which resulted in a regional political realignment for the South. After Nixon's victory in 1968, the state voted Democratic in only four presidential elections: 1976 (Jimmy Carter), 1996 (Bill Clinton), 2008 (Barack Obama), and 2012 (Barack Obama). The presidential election in 2000 was decided by a margin of 537 votes out of approximately six million cast in the state, earning George W. Bush the presidency over Al Gore.

The Florida Senate was dominated by Democrats until 1992, when a majority of Republicans was elected. The Florida House of Representatives turned Republican after the November 1996 election. The Florida Legislature became the first legislature in any of the states of the former Confederacy to come under complete Republican control when the Republicans gained control of the House and Senate in the 1996 election.

Since the passage of the Affordable Care Act, Florida Democrats have prioritized advocating Medicaid expansion in the state, a policy that would provide a federally subsidized healthcare plan to approximately one million Floridians.

== Governance ==
The current chairwoman of the Florida Democratic Party is former agriculture commissioner Nikki Fried, who succeeded former mayor of Miami Manny Diaz Sr. on February 25, 2023.

List of Chairs
Name	Years in Office	Details
Scott Maddox	2003-2005	Maddox, the former mayor of Tallahassee, Florida, served as chairman of the Florida Democratic Party from 2003 to 2006, leaving the post to run for governor. The Associated Press noted that while Democrats suffered electoral defeats during his tenure, party activists recognized he had built up the party's infrastructure and volunteer base."
Karen Thurman	2005-2010	Thurman, a former five-term member of Congress from Florida's 5th District, served from 2005 to 2010. She was elected chairman of the Florida Democratic Party in 2005, succeeding Scott Maddox, who resigned in order to seek the Democratic nomination for governor. Thurman resigned on November 12, 2010, following the midterm elections.
Rod Smith	2010-2013	In November 2010, Smith was elected chairman of the Florida Democratic Party, succeeding Karen Thurman who resigned on November 12, 2010, following the midterm elections. Smith, a former Alachua County state prosecutor and state senator from the 14th district, became chair following his unsuccessful bid for lieutenant governor in 2010. Smith's term expired in January 2013, when he was succeeded by Allison Tant.
Allison Tant	2014-2016	In December 2013, former lobbyist, philanthropist, and Democratic fundraiser Allison Tant announced she would seek the chairmanship of the Florida Democratic Party. She was elected in January 2014, after a closely contested race against Hillsborough state committeeman Alan Clendenin. After large national losses in 2014, Debbie Wasserman Schultz commissioned the Victory Task Force to "take a deep dive" to figure out what went wrong in 2014. Similarly, Chair Tant created the state-level LEAD Task Force, to learn the lessons of the statewide Democratic defeat.
Stephen Bittel	2016-2017	Bittel, who founded real estate investment firm Terranova in 1980, is still an active Democrat in the state. He was chosen primarily for his fundraising ability after the 2016 election, but many critics noted his ability to curry influence with his immense wealth. In November 2017, he was accused of inappropriate office behavior, and subsequently left his role.
Terrie Rizzo	2017-2021	In December 2017, Rizzo was elected to replace Stephen Bittel, defeating Stacey Patel in an 830–291 vote. During Rizzo's term as chair and as a consequence of the COVID-19 pandemic, the party focused on developing web products and established a department for social media marketing.
Manny Diaz	2021-2023	In January 2021, Diaz was elected with 54% from party leaders to replace Terrie Rizzo. Diaz was elected partly to bring outreach from the Cuban-American community, which was a voting bloc that helped Donald Trump win the state in the 2020 presidential election. Diaz resigned after the 2022 midterms, which saw landslide victories and legislative supermajorities for Republicans in Florida.
Nikki Fried	2023-Present	On February 25, 2023, Fried was elected with 52% of the vote to fill the chair's vacancy after Diaz's resignation, defeating former state senator Annette Taddeo, Broward County Democratic Party chair Rick Hoye, and activist Carolina Ampudia. Fried was elected after a primary defeat in the 2022 Florida gubernatorial election the previous year. Nikki Fried was re-elected to a full four-year term as Chair of the Florida Democratic Party on January 24, 2025. She won re-election with 78% of the votes cast on the first ballot, continuing her leadership after initially being elected chair in 2023 to finish the previous term. This election confirmed her to lead the party for the next four years, starting in 2025.

=== House leaders ===
- Mark Pafford (2014–2016)
- Janet Cruz (2016–2018)
- Kionne McGhee (2018–2020)
- Bobby DuBose (2020–2022)
- Evan Jenne (2022)
- Fentrice Driskell (2022–present)

== Organization ==
The State Executive Committee of the Florida Democratic Party is organized into six standing committees. Standing committees include: the Rules Committee, the Judicial Council, the Diversity and Inclusion Committee, the Committee on Clubs, Organizations, and Caucuses, the Legislative Liaison Committee, and the Campaign Committee.

=== Platform ===
The Florida Democratic Party has adopted a platform that covers a wide range of topics and issues under the following headings:
- Access to Healthcare
- An Economy That Works for Everyone
- Quality Education
- Protecting our Environment
- Immigration Reform
- Preventing Gun Violence
- Civil Rights
- Government Accountability
- Protecting Voting Rights
- Women and Families

== Current elected officials ==
The following is a list of Democratic statewide, federal, and legislative officeholders in Florida.

=== Members of Congress ===
==== U.S. Senate ====
- None

Both of Florida's U.S. Senate seats have been held by Republicans since 2019. Bill Nelson was the last Democrat to represent Florida in the U.S. Senate. First elected in 2000, Nelson lost his bid for a fourth term in 2018 to Republican governor Rick Scott.

==== U.S. House of Representatives ====
Out of the 28 seats Florida is apportioned in the U.S. House of Representatives, 7 are held by Democrats:

District	Member	Photo
9th	Darren Soto	
10th	Maxwell Frost	
14th	Kathy Castor	
22nd	Pia Dandiya (elect)	
22nd → 23rd	Lois Frankel	
23rd → 25th	Jared Moskowitz	
24th	Frederica Wilson	
24th	Oliver Gilbert (elect)	
25th → 20th	Debbie Wasserman Schultz	

=== State ===
==== Statewide officials ====
- None

Florida has not elected a Democrat in a state-wide elected office since November 6, 2018, when Nikki Fried defeated Republican Matt Caldwell in 2018 and was elected Florida's 12th commissioner of Agriculture. While eligible to run for a second term, she instead chose to step down and mounted a challenge against Governor Ron DeSantis, in his own re-election for Governor of Florida. DeSantis would go on to retain his governorship by historic margins.

==== State legislative leaders ====
- Senate minority leader: Lori Berman
- House minority leader: Fentrice Driskell

==== State Senate ====
Democrats hold an 10-seat minority in the 40-member Florida Senate.

==== State House ====
Democrats hold a 33-seat minority in the 120-seat Florida House of Representatives.

=== Mayoral offices ===
Some of the state's major cities have Democratic mayors. As of 2025, Democrats control the mayor's offices in seven of Florida's ten largest cities:

- Boca Raton: Andy Thomson
- Jacksonville (1): Donna Deegan
- Miami (2): Eileen Higgins
- Tampa (3): Jane Castor
- Orlando (4): Buddy Dyer
- St. Petersburg (5): Ken Welch → Charlie Crist (elect)
- Tallahassee (9): John Dailey → Jeremy Matlow (elect)
- Fort Lauderdale (10): Dean Trantalis

== Former Florida governors and U.S. senators ==
=== Governors ===
Democrats last won a gubernatorial election in Florida in 1994.

Photo	Former governors of Florida
	Buddy MacKay
	Lawton Chiles
	Wayne Mixson
	Bob Graham
	Reubin Askew
	W. Haydon Burns
	C. Farris Bryant
	LeRoy Collins
	Daniel McCarty
	Fuller Warren
	Miller Caldwell
	Spessard Holland
	Fred Cone
	David Sholtz
	Doyle Carlton
	John Martin
	Cary Hardee
	Park Trammell
	Albert Gilchrist
	Napoleon Broward
	William Jennings
	William Bloxham
	Henry Mitchell
	Francis Fleming
	Edward Perry
	William Bloxham
	George Drew
	Abraham Allison
	John Milton
	Madison Perry
	James Broome
	William Moseley

=== United States senators ===
Photo	Former U.S. senators from Florida
	Bill Nelson
	Bob Graham
	Lawton Chiles
	Richard Stone
	George Smathers
	Spessard Holland
	Charles Andrews
	Scott Loftin
	Claude Pepper
	William Luther Hill
	Park Trammell
	Nathan Bryan
	James Taliaferro
	Duncan Fletcher
	William Milton
	William James Bryan
	Samuel Pasco
	Charles Jones
	Stephen Mallory II
	Wilkinson Call
	Stephen Mallory
	James Westcott
	David Levy Yulee

== Election results ==
=== Federal ===
==== U.S. House ====
Election	Votes	%	Seats (FL)	±	%
2016	3,985,050	45.21	11 / 27	▲1	1.23
2018	3,307,228	47.10	13 / 27	▲2	1.89
2020	4,942,287	47.23	11 / 27	▼2	0.13
2022	2,905,713	39.63	8 / 28	▼3	6.42
2024	4,339,733	42.02	8 / 28	0	2.49
2026	3,867,145	48.32	8 / 28	0	6.30

=== State ===
==== Executive offices ====
Governor
Election	Candidate	Votes	%	Result
1964	W. Haydon Burns	933,554	56.12%	Won ✓
1966	Robert King High	668,233	44.86%	Lost ✗
1970	Reubin Askew/Thomas B. Adams Jr.	984,305	56.99%	Won ✓
1974	Reubin Askew/Jim Williams	1,118,954	61.20%	Won ✓
1978	Bob Graham/Wayne Mixson	1,406,580	55.59%	Won ✓
1982	Bob Graham/Wayne Mixson	1,739,553	64.70%	Won ✓
1986	Steve Pajcic/Franklin B. Mann	1,538,620	45.44%	Lost ✗
1990	Lawton Chiles/Buddy MacKay	1,995,206	56.51%	Won ✓
1994	Lawton Chiles/Buddy MacKay	2,135,008	50.75%	Won ✓
1998	Buddy MacKay/Rick Dantzler	1,773,054	44.72%	Lost ✗
2002	Bill McBride/Tom Rossin	2,201,427	43.16%	Lost ✗
2006	Jim Davis/Daryl Jones	2,178,289	45.10%	Lost ✗
2010	Alex Sink/Rod Smith	2,557,785	47.72%	Lost ✗
2014	Charlie Crist/Annette Taddeo	2,801,198	47.07%	Lost ✗
2018	Andrew Gillum/Chris King	4,043,723	49.19%	Lost ✗
2022	Charlie Crist/Karla Hernández-Mats	3,106,313	39.97%	Lost ✗
2026	David Jolly/Gwen Graham	4,030,579	48.73%	Lost ✗

== See also ==
- Democratic Black Caucus of Florida
- Democratic Party (United States) organizations
- Political party strength in Florida
- Political party strength in the United States
