= William W. J. Kelly =

American politician (1814–1878)

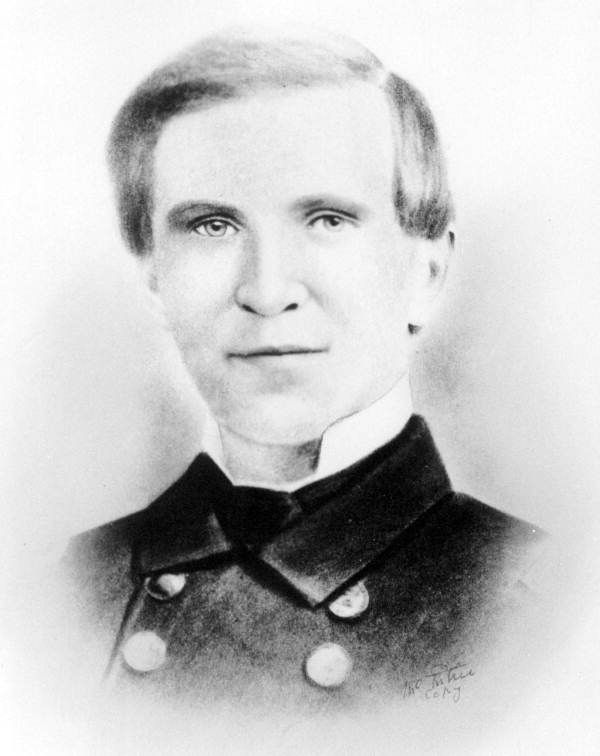

1st Lieutenant Governor of Florida
- In office December 20, 1865 – July 4, 1868
- Governor: David S. Walker
- Preceded by: Position established
- Succeeded by: William Henry Gleason

Member of the Florida House of Representatives

Personal details
- Born: April 7, 1814 Wilmington, North Carolina, U.S.
- Died: September 8, 1878 (aged 64) Pensacola, Florida, U.S.
- Party: Republican
- Spouse(s): Pauline Virginia Mitchell (m. 1851; died 1853) Mary Ella Smith (m. 1856)
- Children: 3

Military service
- Allegiance: United States of America; Confederate States of America
- Branch/service: United States Navy; Confederate States Navy
- Battles/wars: Mexican–American War; American Civil War

William Washington Jones Kelly (April 7, 1814 – September 8, 1878) was the first Lieutenant Governor of Florida.

Kelly was born in Wilmington, North Carolina, to Hanson Kelly and Susan Clark Kelly, an entrepreneurial merchant. The Kelly family moved to Pensacola about 1830. Hanson Kelly became the postmaster for Pensacola, an office he held until his death in the 1850s.

William studied law and entered the Bar of Escambia County, Florida, on November 11, 1832. He served in various court capacities and seems to have never really practiced law.

In 1837, he served as a private with his father in a company of men that was formed in Pensacola to cross the bay and round up wayward Creek Indians, slated for removal to Oklahoma.

He served in the Florida Territorial Legislature (senate and house) and later in the state House of Representatives, representing Escambia County, until the split of Escambia and Santa Rosa Counties in 1845. He served as a justice of the peace from February 10, 1831, until his death for both counties.

In 1846, he was elected an alderman for Pensacola. During this year he also was a founding member of the Masonic Lodge (Escambia Lodge No. 15, F & AM) in Pensacola.

From March 1847 to June 1848, served as captain of Company A of the Florida Volunteers during the Mexican–American War, a part of the Florida Battalion, of which he commanded while the group was in Mexico.

In 1850, he was elected Worshipful Master of the Escambia Lodge No. 15 in Pensacola.

In 1851, he married Pauline Virginia Mitchell and was given bounty land in Santa Rosa County, Florida, for his service in the Mexican–American War. He later sold the land.

In 1852, his oldest daughter, Pauline Virginia Kelly, was born. On April 5, 1852, he entered the U.S. Navy as a purser and served on various ships and at the Pensacola Navy Yard over the next nine years.

In September 1853, during a yellow fever epidemic, his wife died. He took a leave of absence from the U.S. Navy and did not return to duty for a year and a half.

On May 8, 1856, he married Mary Ella Smith in Pensacola. He spent 1857 aboard various ships in the Caribbean. His daughter Mary was born in 1867 and his son William W. J. Kelly Jr. was born in 1858. In the 1860 census he owned 8 slaves (belonging to his late wife's estate and thus to his eldest daughter) and was the legal guardian of his brother, Frederick.

On Jan 21, 1861, Kelly resigned his commission in the U.S. Navy, one of the last allowed to do so before the outbreak of the American Civil War. On March 26 he joined the Confederate Navy and was given the rank of paymaster and sent to the Savannah Squadron. He was in charge of the Columbus (GA) Iron Works and a shipbuilding operation while in this station. In 1864, he was stationed in Mobile and later surrendered there at the end of the war. After his parole, he returned to Pensacola with his family.

He was a delegate from Escambia County for the Republican Party for the 1865 Florida Constitutional Convention. He was later elected the first lieutenant governor of Florida, a position he held for three years. He was sworn in as Lieutenant Governor on December 20, 1865.

In 1871, Kelly was elected a county circuit court judge and also served as a county judge (different jurisdiction). He also served as a commissioner for the federal district court.

In 1876 and 1877, Kelly served as a customs inspector at the Port of Pensacola and died on September 8, 1878. He was buried in the northeast corner grave of the northeast corner plot of the northeast corner of St. John's Cemetery, which was a Masonic Cemetery at the time, a very privileged place.

Political offices
Preceded by Position established	Lieutenant Governor of Florida; 1865–1868	Succeeded by William Henry Gleason
