= Robert Elrod =

American politician (1926–2017)

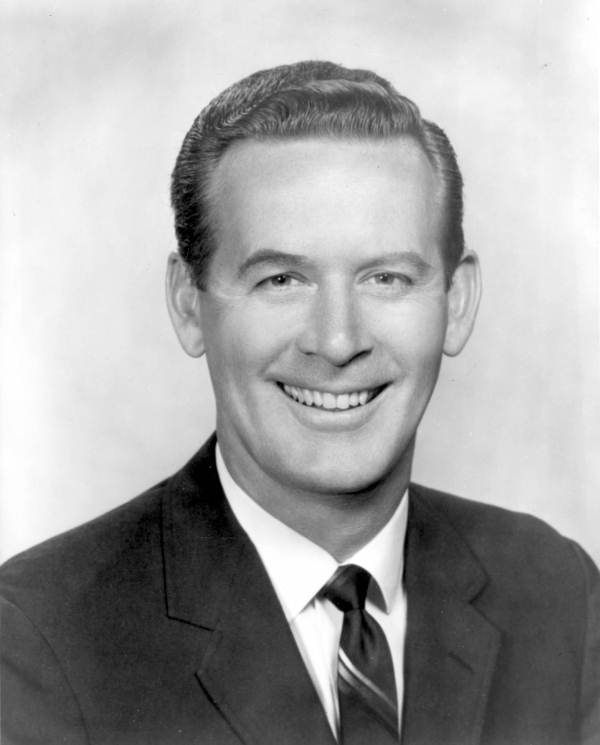

Member of the Florida House of Representatives from the Orange County district
- In office 1963–1966

Personal details
- Born: Robert H. Elrod; March 15, 1926 Henryville, Indiana, U.S.
- Died: December 17, 2017 (aged 91) Orlando, Florida, U.S.
- Party: Republican

Robert H. Elrod (March 15, 1926 – December 17, 2017) was an American former politician in the state of Florida.

Elrod was born in Henryville, Indiana and came to Florida in 1960. He is an alumnus of Purdue University and was a citrus grower and advertising agency owner. Elrod served in the Florida House of Representatives from 1963 to 1966 as a Republican representing Orange County.
