= Jerry Thomas (Florida politician) =

American banker and politician

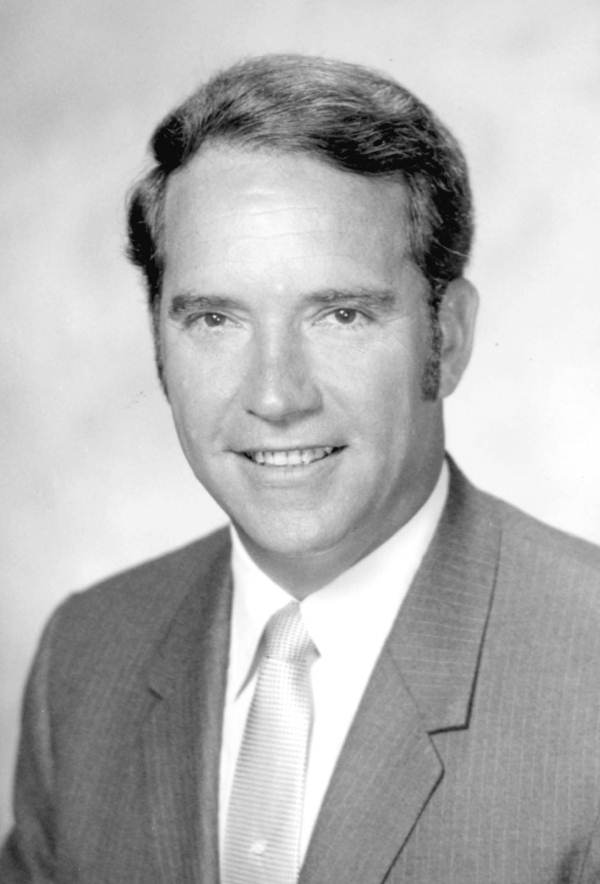
- Portrait of Jerry Thomas in 1970

President of the Florida Senate
- In office November 17, 1970 – November 21, 1972
- Preceded by: John E. Mathews Jr.
- Succeeded by: Mallory E. Horne

Member of the Florida Senate from the 35th district
- In office April 6, 1965 – November 21, 1972
- Preceded by: Ralph J. Blank Jr.
- Succeeded by: Jack D. Gordon

Member of the Florida House of Representatives
- In office 1960-1964

Personal details
- Born: April 30, 1929 West Palm Beach, Florida, U.S.
- Died: July 29, 1980 (aged 51) Jupiter, Florida, U.S.
- Party: Democrat (Before 1974); Republican (1974-1980)
- Spouse: Jeannie Hair
- Children: Robbie Thomas; Larry Thomas; Kenny Thomas; Jerry Thomas; Cindy Thomas
- Education: Palm Beach Junior College; Florida State University; Florida Atlantic University; Harvard Business School; Columbia Business School

Jerry Thomas (April 30, 1929 – July 29, 1980) was an American banker and state legislator in Florida who served in the Florida House of Representatives and the Florida Senate, including two years as President of the Florida Senate.

== Biography ==
He was born April 30, 1929 in West Palm Beach in Florida. He graduated from Palm Beach High School in 1946, then went to Palm Beach Junior College before going to Florida State University to get his degree.

Thomas volunteered for military service in 1952 during the Korean War. He served as a logistics teacher in the U. S. Marine Corps retiring in 1954 at the rank of captain.

At the age of 27 he helped establish a bank holding company which he turned into a multi-million dollar corporation. He was made the director of the Florida Securities Commission in 1957. In 1963 he formed First Marine Bank where he was an associate until he quit for health reasons in 1980.

Thomas was first elected to serve in the Florida House of Representatives. He served from 1960 for 4 years. He then served in the Florida Senate for eight years. While in the senate he was President of the Florida Senate for two years. During his service he authored and co-sponsored hundreds of laws. He was a Democrat but he swapped to the Republican Party in 1974.

He ran for the position of Governor of Florida as the Republican candidate in the 1974 Florida gubernatorial election, but lost to the Democrat Reubin Askew. He served as undersecretary in the Gerald Ford Administration Treasury, but quit after just 6 months saying "I'm going back home to earn enough money to pay taxes to pay for some of this colossal waste I've seen up here".

Thomas died July 29, 1980 at home from cancer aged 51. He had had a tumor removed from his stomach a few months earlier. He was survived by his wife and five children.
