= Chuck Hall (Florida politician) =

American politician

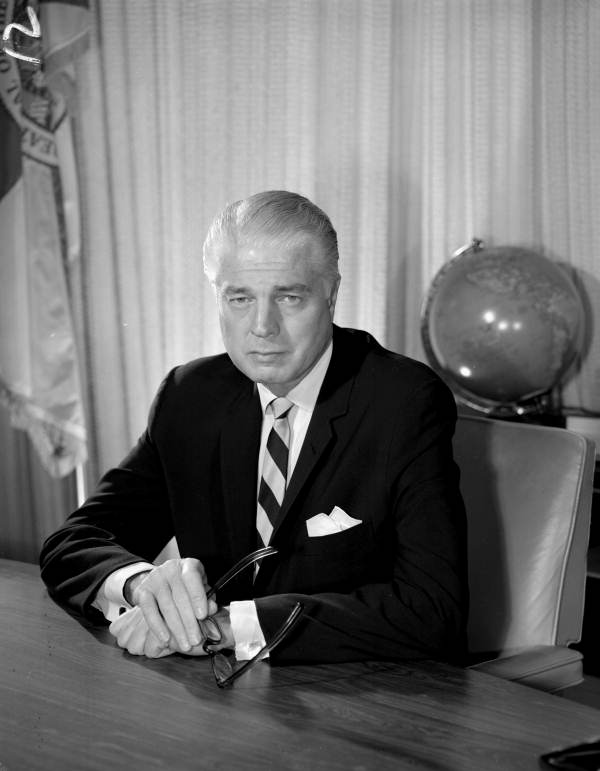
- official portrait, 1969

26th Mayor of Miami Beach
- In office November 2, 1971 – August 10, 1974
- Preceded by: Jay Dermer
- Succeeded by: Harold Rosen

1st Mayor of Metropolitan Dade County
- In office 1964–1970
- Preceded by: Office established
- Succeeded by: Stephen P. Clark

Personal details
- Born: Charles F. Hall; 1918
- Died: August 10, 1974 (aged 55–56)
- Party: Democratic
- Spouse: Jacqueline Hall

photograph of Hall as mayor in 1972

Charles F. Hall (1918 – August 10, 1974) was an American politician from Charlotte, North Carolina who was involved within the politics of Florida. He was the inaugural mayor of Metropolitan Dade County from 1964 to 1970, and the mayor of Miami Beach from 1971 until his death in 1974.

His first job in Florida politics was as a member of the Dade County Commission, when he was elected in 1956. Hall ran for office in 1963, where he faced no opposition to become the inaugural mayor of Metropolitan Dade County. He resigned as mayor of Dade County in 1970, in order to run for governor of Florida, but finished last in the primaries with 18.36% of the vote. He would later be elected as the mayor of Miami Beach, and at the time of his death, was about to resign so he could run for Dade County mayor again.

== See also ==
- Miami Beach Mayors
