= Ray Osborne =

American politician

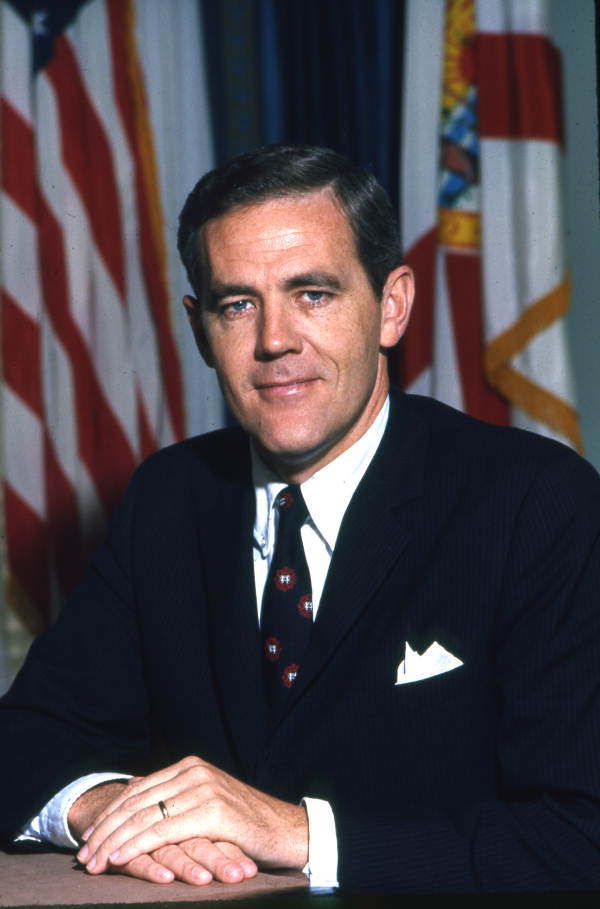
- Official portrait of Lt. Gov. Osborne circa 1969–1971

9th Lieutenant Governor of Florida
- In office January 7, 1969 – January 5, 1971
- Governor: Claude Roy Kirk
- Preceded by: Milton H. Mabry
- Succeeded by: Tom Adams

Member of the Florida House of Representatives
- In office 1964-1968

Personal details
- Born: Raymond Claiborne Osborne; September 7, 1933 Winston-Salem, North Carolina, US
- Died: March 3, 2011 (aged 77) Boca Raton, Florida
- Party: Republican

Raymond Claiborne Osborne (September 7, 1933 – March 3, 2011), was a Florida Republican Party politician who served as the first Lieutenant Governor of Florida under the state constitution of 1968. Osborne was the state's first lieutenant governor since 1889. Appointed by Republican Governor Claude R. Kirk, Jr., Osborne was sworn in on January 7, 1969, for a term that lasted two years.

Born in Winston-Salem, North Carolina, Osborne graduated from North Carolina State University in 1955. He then served in the United States Army from 1955 to 1957. Osborne graduated from the University of North Carolina School of Law in 1961. Osborne moved with his wife to St. Petersburg, Florida. From 1964 to 1968, Osborne served in the Florida House of Representatives, and unsuccessfully ran for the Florida Public Service Commission in 1968. Osborne practiced law for many years in Boca Raton, Florida, until his death in March 2011.

Party political offices
First	Republican nominee for Lieutenant Governor of Florida; 1970	Succeeded by Mike Thompson
Political offices
Preceded by Milton H. Mabry; Office abolished from 1889 to 1969	Lieutenant Governor of Florida; 1969–1971	Succeeded by Thomas Burton Adams, Jr.
