= Thomas Burton Adams Jr. =

American politician (1917–2006)

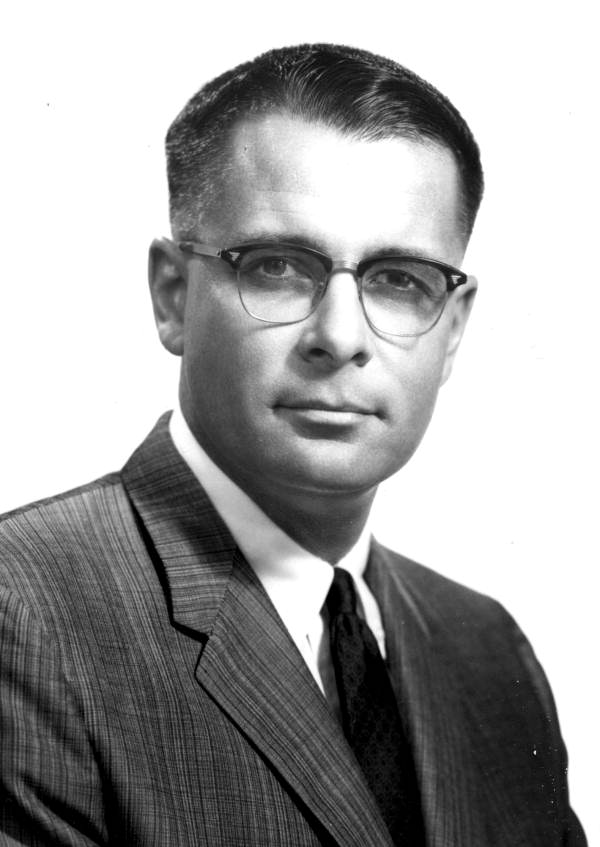

10th Lieutenant Governor of Florida
- In office January 5, 1971 – January 7, 1975
- Governor: Reubin O'Donovan Askew
- Preceded by: Ray Osborne
- Succeeded by: Jim Williams

15th Secretary of State of Florida
- In office January 5, 1961 – January 5, 1971
- Governor: C. Farris Bryant; W. Haydon Burns; Claude R. Kirk Jr.
- Preceded by: Robert Andrew Gray
- Succeeded by: Richard B. Stone

Member of the Florida Senate from the 29th district
- In office November 6, 1956 – November 8, 1960
- Preceded by: Edwin Fraser
- Succeeded by: Edwin Fraser

Personal details
- Born: March 11, 1917 Jacksonville, Florida, U.S.
- Died: May 22, 2006 (aged 89) Live Oak, Florida, U.S.
- Party: Democratic
- Spouse: Helen Brown (m. 1939)
- Education: University of Michigan
- Profession: Real estate and insurance business

Thomas Burton Adams Jr. (March 11, 1917 – May 22, 2006) was an American politician from the U.S. state of Florida. A Democrat, he served in the Florida Senate (1956–1960), as Secretary of State of Florida (1961–1971), and as the tenth Lieutenant Governor of Florida (1971–1975).

== Early life and career ==
Adams was born in Jacksonville, Florida to Thomas Burton Adams Sr. and the former Carolyn Hamilton. He attended the University of Michigan. Adams married Helen Brown on July 30, 1939, and had a career as a real estate developer and an insurance businessman. Adams married Frances Sue Brewer in September 1973.

== Political career ==
Adams began his political career when he was elected to the Florida State Senate in 1956 from the 29th district, encompassing Clay and Baker Counties. He served one term before being elected secretary of state in 1960, a position to which he was reelected in 1964 and 1966.

=== Lieutenant governor ===
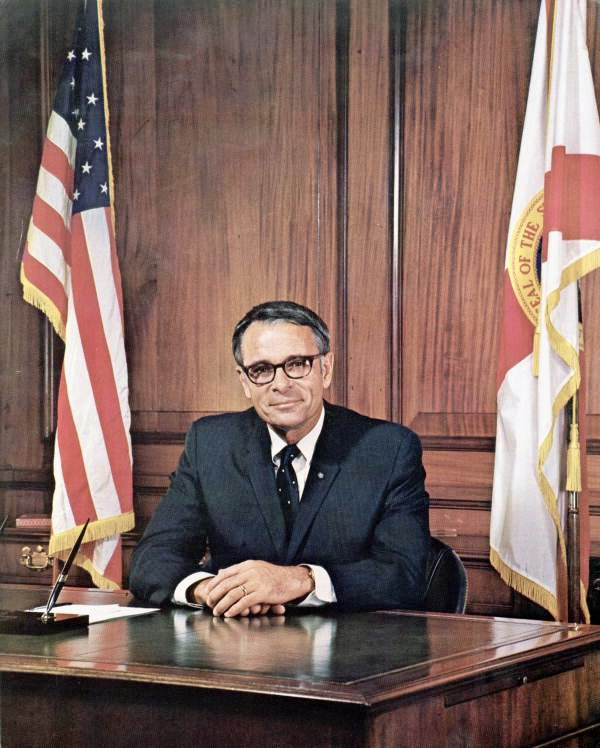
Adams as Lieutenant Governor

In 1970, Democratic gubernatorial nominee Reubin Askew selected Adams as his running mate. Askew and Adams defeated incumbent Republicans Governor Claude Roy Kirk and Lieutenant Governor Ray Osborne. Adams was the second lieutenant governor following the position's reinstatement after over 80 years. He was the first Democrat to hold the position under the 1968 Constitution.

Though Adams was relied upon in the 1970 gubernatorial race as a seasoned Florida political veteran, he quickly became a liability over the course of his term. Askew, acting on the recommendation of political adviser Michael G. Kimber, appointed him state Secretary of Commerce, but Adams ran into ethical problems in 1973 when it was discovered that, in debt, he was leasing a 1,000-acre (4.0 km^{2}) farm in Quincy, Florida, and was using a department employee to manage it on government time. He was forced to repay $1,736 to the state and was censured by a legislative committee in lieu of impeachment. The scandal was the primary reason he was dropped from the 1974 ticket in favor of Jim Williams, who succeeded Adams as lieutenant governor after the Askew-Williams ticket's successful election.

== Later life ==
Adams became the NASCAR National Commissioner in 1971.

Adams briefly tried to make a political comeback in 1984 when he ran in a special election for a state senate seat, but he was trounced by Republican Tim Deratany by a margin of more than 2–1.

Adams, a Baptist, was a member of Newcomen Society, Rotary Club, Alpha Kappa Psi and Phi Delta Theta.

=== Death ===
Adams was killed in a crash on Interstate 10 at the Suwannee County-Columbia County border at about 2:50 pm on May 22, 2006. His 18-year-old son Thomas Burton Adams III was also in the 2004 Ford Explorer Sport Trac that Adams was driving at the time of the crash and was seriously injured. The accident occurred about 10 miles (16 km) northeast of Live Oak, the Suwannee county seat. Adams did not have on his seat belt when the crash occurred. Governor Jeb Bush ordered that all government buildings be flown at half-staff in Adams' honor.

Party political offices
Preceded by Robert Andrew Gray	Democratic nominee for Secretary of State of Florida; 1960, 1964, 1966	Succeeded by Richard Stone
First	Democratic nominee for Lieutenant Governor of Florida; 1970	Succeeded by Jim Williams
Political offices
Preceded by Robert Andrew Gray	Secretary of State of Florida; 1961–1971	Succeeded by Richard Bernard Stone
Preceded by Ray Osborne	Lieutenant Governor of Florida; 1971–1975	Succeeded by J. H. Williams
