= List of elections in 1868 =

The following elections occurred in the year 1868.

== North America ==
=== United States ===
- 1868 New York state election
- 1868 United States elections

==== United States Presidential ====
- 1868 United States presidential election

==== United States Senate ====
- 1868 and 1869 United States Senate elections

==== United States House of Representatives ====
- 1868 United States House of Representatives elections
- United States House of Representatives elections in California, 1868
- United States House of Representatives elections in Florida, 1868

==== United States lieutenant gubernatorial ====
- 1868 Connecticut lieutenant gubernatorial election
- 1868 Illinois lieutenant gubernatorial election
- 1868 Missouri lieutenant gubernatorial election

==== United States gubernatorial ====
- 1868 Alabama gubernatorial election
- 1868 Arkansas gubernatorial election
- 1868 Connecticut gubernatorial election
- 1868 Florida gubernatorial election
- 1868 Georgia gubernatorial election
- 1868 Illinois gubernatorial election
- 1868 Indiana gubernatorial election
- 1868 Kansas gubernatorial election
- 1868 Kentucky gubernatorial special election
- 1868 Louisiana gubernatorial election
- 1868 Maine gubernatorial election
- 1868 Massachusetts gubernatorial election
- 1868 Michigan gubernatorial election
- 1868 Mississippi gubernatorial election
- 1868 Nebraska gubernatorial election
- 1868 New Hampshire gubernatorial election
- 1868 New Jersey gubernatorial election
- 1868 New York gubernatorial election
- 1868 North Carolina gubernatorial election
- 1868 Rhode Island gubernatorial election
- 1868 South Carolina gubernatorial election
- 1868 Vermont gubernatorial election
- 1868 West Virginia gubernatorial election

==== United States mayoral elections ====
- 1868 Boston mayoral election
- 1868 Manchester, New Hampshire, mayoral election
- 1868 New York City mayoral special election
- 1868 Philadelphia mayoral election
- 1868 Worcester, Massachusetts, mayoral election

== Europe ==
- 1868 Belgian general election
- 1868 Dutch general election
- 1868 Greek parliamentary election
- 1868 Luxembourg general election
- 1868 Norwegian parliamentary election
- 1868 Portuguese legislative election
- 1868 Serbian parliamentary election
- 1868 United Kingdom general election
- 1868 United Kingdom general election in Ireland

== South America ==
- 1868 Argentine presidential election
- 1867-68 Colombian presidential election
- 1868 Ecuadorian presidential election
- 1868 Peruvian general election

== Oceania ==
- First Māori elections

== See also ==
- Category:1868 elections
