= Brevard =

Brevard may refer to:

== People ==
- Aleshia Brevard (1937–2017), American author and actress
- Caroline Mays Brevard (1860–1920), American historian
- Cole Brevard (born 2001), American football player
- John Brevard, American artist
- Joseph Brevard (1760–1821), American soldier and politician
- Samarria Brevard (born 1993), American skateboarder
- Theodore W. Brevard Jr. (1835–1882), American military officer and politician
- Theodorus W. Brevard (1804–1877), American politician
- Brevard Childs (1923–2007), American Old Testament scholar and professor

== Places ==
- Brevard, North Carolina, United States, a city
  - Brevard College, a private college
  - Brevard High School, a public high school
  - Brevard Music Center, a classical music venue
- Brevard County, Florida, United States
  - Brevard Zoo, a zoo in Melbourne
- Brevard Fault, a thrust fault in the United States

== Other uses ==
- USS Brevard, an Alamosa-class cargo ship of the U.S. Navy
