= Theodore W. Brevard Jr. =

American politician and Confederate Army officer (1835–1882)

Theodore W. Brevard
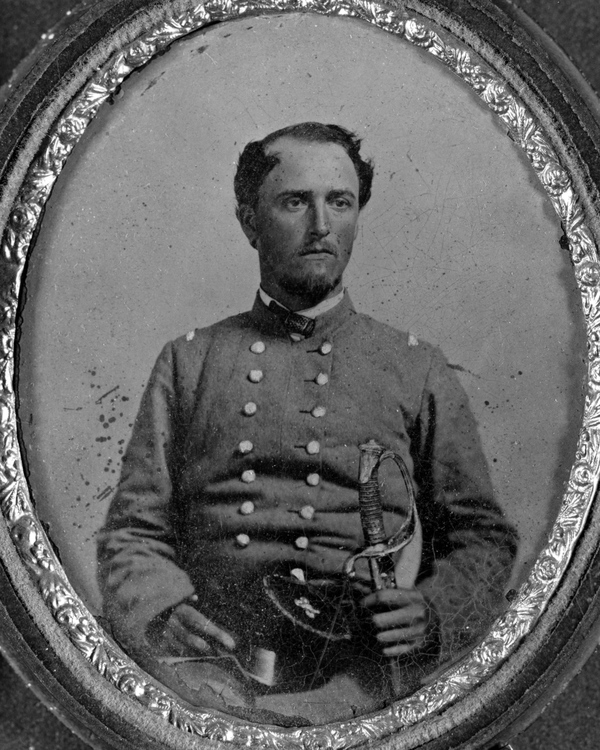

Member of the Florida Senate from the 10th district
- In office 1865–1866

Member of the Florida House of Representatives
- In office 1858–1859

Personal details
- Born: August 26, 1835 Tuskegee, Alabama
- Died: June 20, 1882 (aged 46) Tallahassee, Florida
- Spouse: Mary Call
- Education: University of Virginia

Military service
- Allegiance: United States (Confederate States of America) Confederate States
- Branch/service: Florida Militia; Confederate States Army
- Years of service: 1857–1861 (USA); 1861–1865 (CSA)
- Rank: Brigadier general
- Commands: 2nd Florida Infantry Battalion; 11th Florida Infantry Regiment
- Battles/wars: American Civil War

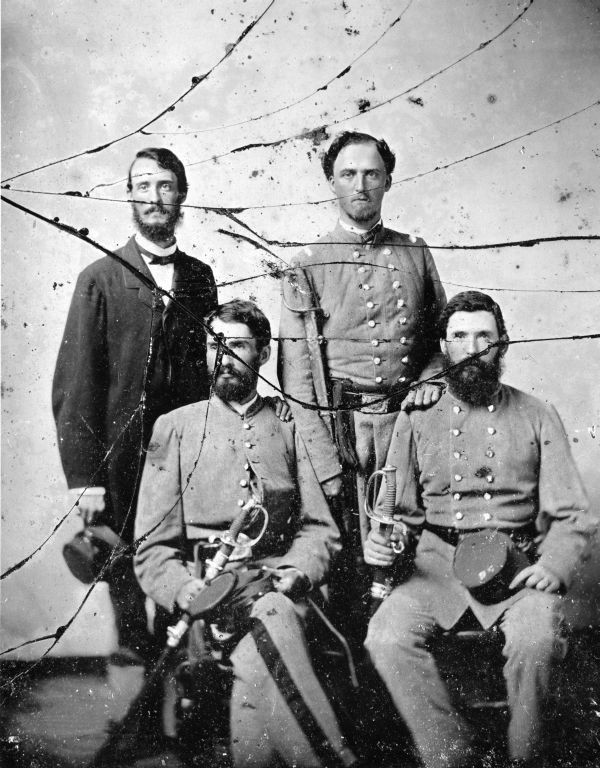
Brevard pictured with fellow Confederate officers at Tallahassee, Florida

Theodore Washington Brevard Jr. (August 26, 1835 – June 20, 1882) was best known for having served as a military officer in the Confederate States Army. During his tenure with the Confederate army, he eventually reached the rank of Brigadier-General. Brevard was captured by the forces of General George Custer and imprisoned at Johnson's Island. He later died in 1882.

He was the son of Judge Theodorus W. Brevard, the namesake of Brevard County, Florida and Caroline E. Mays Brevard. He was the son-in-law of Florida territorial governor Richard K. Call. The historian and educator Caroline Mays Brevard was his daughter.

== Early life and political career ==
Theodore Washington Brevard Jr. was born in Tuskegee, Alabama, on August 26, 1835, and studied law at the University of Virginia. He was admitted to the Florida bar in 1858, and later served in the Florida House of Representatives from 1858 to 1859, and in the Florida Senate representing the 10th district from 1865 to 1866.

On April 14, 1859, he married Mary Call, the daughter of Richard Keith Call. The wedding took place at The Grove, which was the residence of his sister-in-law Ellen Call Long.

In June 1860, Brevard was appointed adjutant and inspector-general for the state of Florida. At the beginning of the Civil War in 1861, he resigned from this post to enter active service, feeling that "he was too young a man to hold a safe and easy position whiles others were in peril".

== Military career ==
Brevard started his military service as the First Lieutenant, under command of Captain John Parkhill, in a company of Florida Mounted Volunteers, called the "Leon Volunteers". The company of three officers and 76 soldiers mustered into service at Tallahassee in July 1857 and promptly moved to Fort Myers where they searched for Seminoles hiding in the Everglades. On November 26 Captain Parkhill led a force to burn Seminole crops near Royal Palm Hammock. The next day he led a six-man patrol searching for Indian trails. His patrol was ambushed and he and five soldiers were killed. First Lieutenant Brevard took command after Parkhill's death and was promoted to Captain. The company mustered out of service in Tallahassee on January 28, 1858, and Brevard was promoted to Major and served as the Adjutant General of Florida's militia.

When Florida Governor John Milton stood up the 2nd Florida Infantry of ten companies, Major Brevard had been serving as adjutant general of the militia. He resigned, commissioned as a captain, and raised an infantry company in Tallahassee called the Leon Volunteers, Company D, 2nd Florida. His company, with the 2nd Florida, rendezvoused near the Brick Church, just west of Jacksonville, now a neighborhood known as LaVilla. They were mustered into Confederate service on July 13, 1861, and organized by the election of their commander, Colonel George Taliaferro Ward of Leon County. Two days later, on Monday, July 15 the Regiment left by rail for Richmond, Virginia. They arrived Sunday afternoon, July 21, the same day that the Battle of First Manassas was fought some 100 miles to the north. The Regiment was in a Camp of Instruction in the neighborhood of Richmond where they trained for nearly two months. On September 17, 1861, the Regiment left Richmond for Yorktown. Captain Brevard fought with Leon Rifles in the Siege of Yorktown and at the Battle of Williamsburg.

Shortly after Williamsburg, the 2nd Florida held new officer elections and Captain Brevard left the 2nd Florida, returning to Florida in the summer of 1862. Brevard served for a short time certifying and mustering units until he was appointed Major and formed a cavalry battalion known as Brevard's Partisan Rangers which consisted of four companies. Brevard's Battalion fought in skirmishes around Jacksonville during 1863. His battalion was increased to five companies and Brevard promoted to Lieutenant Colonel shortly. On February 20, 1864, the battalion fought with Finegan's Brigade at the Battle of Olustee where they repulsed the Union advance from Jacksonville on Tallahassee. Shortly after the battle, Finegan's Brigade, of which Brevard's Battalion was a part of, was ordered to Virginia. On May 17 the unit left for Richmond by train, arriving on May 25. Finegan's troops and Perry's Florida Brigade consolidated and fought in the Battle of Cold Harbor on May 28. On June 8, the Brigade reorganized and the 11th Florida Infantry was created with Brevard appointed its Colonel and commander. After the battle, the 11th Florida, with Finegan's Brigade marched to Petersburg where they joined the defense. Colonel Brevard and the 11th Florida fought in the Weldon Railroad where Brevard learned of the death of his younger brother, Lieutenant Mays Brevard. Colonel Brevard led the 11th Florida through the Battle of Ream's Station on June 23, the Battle of Globe Tavern on August 21, the Battle of Belfield on December 9, 1864, and the Battle of Hatcher's Run, February 5–7, 1865. Brevard took command of the Florida Brigade on March 22, 1865, leading it until he and his command were captured at the Battle of Sailor's Creek on April 6, 1865, just 3 days shy of General Lee's surrender of the Army of Northern Virginia at Appomattox.

== Capture ==
Upon the resignation of General Finegan, Brevard was made a brigadier-general, making him the last Confederate General appointed by President Davis. On 6 April 1865, while leading a contingent of men from the 5th, 8th and 11th Florida regiments to break a flank movement of the enemy, Brevard and his men were captured by General George Custer's cavalry. Brevard was sent to Washington and later to Johnson's Island where he was imprisoned until his release in August 1865. The Union army had not realized that they had captured General Brevard, they thought they had captured Colonel Brevard. Despite Custer's habit of enumerating all of his battlefield prizes, no federal provost marshal had counted Brevard as a General. Quite possibly, Brevard had no idea he was a General himself, as his March 28 commission to the post had not reached him due to the chaos of the retreat, and he may not have discovered that he was a general until the war was over.

== Later life and death ==
Brevard bought a house in 1875 near the Grove at 622 North Monroe St. The house was built in 1833 for Francis Eppes. Brevard died on June 20, 1882 in Tallahassee, Florida.

== See also ==
- List of American Civil War generals (Acting Confederate)
