= Ellen Call Long =

American activist and writer (1825–1905)

Ellen Walker Call Long
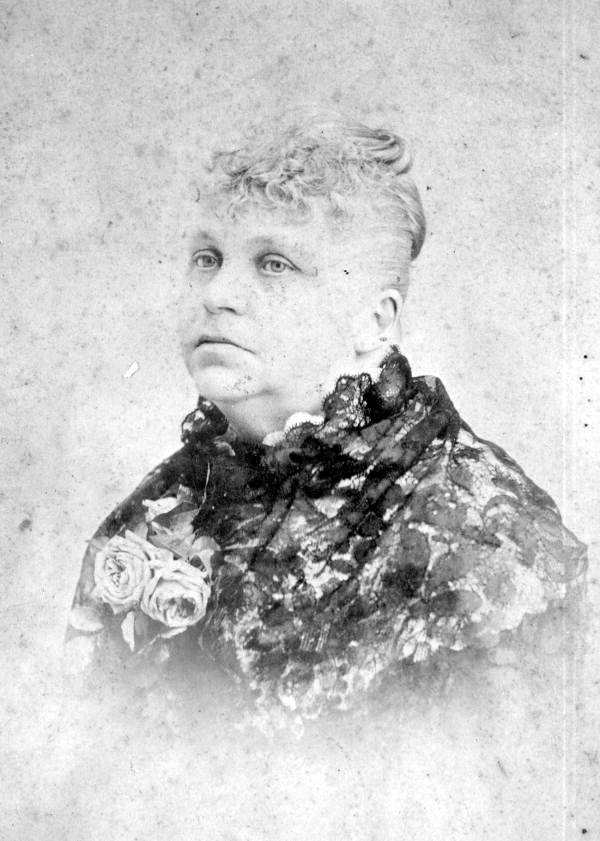
- Born: Ellen Walker Call; September 9, 1825; Tallahassee, Florida
- Died: 1905; Tallahassee, Florida, U.S.
- Resting place: Call Family Cemetery, Tallahassee, Florida
- Occupations: planter, historic preservationist, writer, historian, forester
- Spouse: Medicus Long
- Children: Richard Call Long, Sr. Eleanora Long Hollinger
- Parent(s): Richard Keith Call; Mary Letitia Kirkman
- Relatives: Caroline Mays Brevard (niece); Mary Call Darby Collins (grandniece); Wilkinson Call (cousin); David S. Walker (cousin)

Ellen Call Long (September 9, 1825 – 1905) was the daughter of Florida territorial governor Richard Keith Call and a member of the influential Call-Walker political family of Florida. She acquired The Grove from her father in 1851 and held it until 1903. She received distinction after the Civil War for her efforts in historic preservation, history, memorialization, forestry, silkworm cultivation, and the promotion of Florida. She was the author of Florida Breezes, a semi-fictional account of antebellum life primarily set in Middle Florida, which is widely regarded as one of the best primary source accounts of the planter class lifestyle in Florida. She was the founder of the Florida chapters of the Mount Vernon Ladies Association and the Ladies Hermitage Association. She was also named a Florida delegate to several important expositions, including the Centennial International Exhibition in Philadelphia (1876), the World's Columbian Exposition in Chicago (1893), and the Exposition Universelle in Paris, France (1889). She founded the Ladies Memorial Association of Tallahassee, a group now known as the Anna Jackson Chapter of the United Daughters of the Confederacy. Her published report, which was written before the American Forestry Congress in 1888 and titled "Notes of Some of the Forest Features of Florida," is considered a seminal work in the field of fire ecology. She was also a tireless promoter of silk culture in Florida, representing the Ladies Silk Culture Association of Philadelphia and emerging as a local expert in cultivation.

== Early life ==
Ellen Call Long was born on The Grove property in Tallahassee, Florida on September 9, 1825, the first child of Richard Keith Call and Mary Letitia Kirkman. Of the 8 children born to the Calls, only their oldest and youngest daughters lived to adulthood. According to popular legend, Ellen was the first white child born in the city, a story she openly advertised later in her life.

After spending early life in Tallahassee, her parents sent her north to boarding schools in Baltimore and later Philadelphia. She was especially close to her mother, and her mother's death in 1836 had a profound impact on the rest of Ellen Call Long's life. Concerned over his family's precarious situation, Richard Keith Call sent his two surviving daughters to Nashville, Tennessee, to live with his mother-in-law. Ellen spent the rest of her childhood between Nashville and several northern boarding schools. Despite this separation, she and her father grew to be especially close, and she remained fiercely loyal to her father for the rest of her life.

== Return to Tallahassee ==
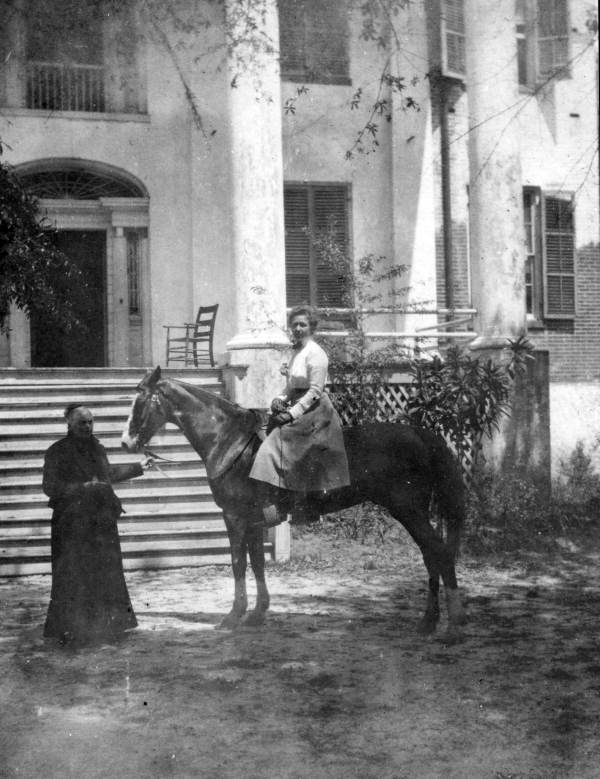
Ellen Call Long and Unknown Woman in Front of Grove, ca. 1880

In 1843, Ellen Call Long returned to Tallahassee to live permanently. By this time, her father was in his second term as governor. Ellen quickly established herself within the elite social circles of the city, acting as a hostess for her father. In 1844, she married Medicus A. Long, a promising young lawyer from Tennessee who later served multiple terms in the Florida State Legislature. Like her parents before her, only Ellen's oldest and youngest children, Richard Call Long and Eleanora Long Hollinger, survived to adulthood.

After a failed run for governor in 1845, her father began committing himself more to his plantation at Orchard Pond. In 1851, he formally deeded The Grove to Ellen, who had already established her family there. Ellen later inherited Orchard Pond and the people her father enslaved, which served as her main means of support through the end of the Civil War.

During the 1850s, her father emerged as one of the state's leading voices of Southern Unionism. After the demise of the Whig Party, Call was active in several pro-unionist parties, including the American Party and the Constitutional Union Party. Ever loyal to her father, she was a staunch Unionist, which put her at odds with her husband, an outspoken secessionist. Medicus Long even openly debated in public with his father-in-law on the subject of secession. Long eventually relocated to Texas shortly before the Civil War, ostensibly for health reasons, but they remained separated for the rest of their lives, although they remained officially married.

Although she vehemently opposed secession, Ellen Call Long still supported the Confederate cause, opening her home to wounded soldiers and hosting Confederate officers. Her son Richard Long enlisted in the 2nd Florida Cavalry. Her enthusiasm for the cause was guarded, however, as she refused to invest in Confederate bonds and remained bitterly opposed to secessionists, which became more pronounced as the war progressed. Tallahassee remained the only southern capital not to fall into Union hands during the war. As a result, the city's people were spared much of the destruction that befell cities such as Richmond, Atlanta, and Charleston. With the surrender of General Joseph Johnston, the Confederate forces in Florida were ordered to disband. Ellen Call Long witnessed the entry of General McCook into Tallahassee in May 1865. Despite her strong Unionism, she was embittered by the humiliation faced by the Confederacy's at defeat.

== Reconstruction era ==
Although the end of the Civil War and the beginning of Reconstruction brought significant economic hardships to the Southern United States, this period marked a remarkable political turnaround for Ellen Call Long's family. In 1865, her cousin David S. Walker was elected governor of Florida and another cousin Wilkinson Call was elected as senator. Ellen continued to rely on income from her Orchard Pond property, which now utilized sharecropper labor, many formerly enslaved by the Call family. After a brief period in Texas, her son and his wife joined her at The Grove, where they resided with their two children. Her widowed daughter and her two sons also moved into the residence later.

== Historic preservation ==
Ellen Call Long represented Florida in founding two of the most prominent national historic preservation organizations of the era, the Mount Vernon Ladies Association (MVLA) and the Ladies Hermitage Association (LHA). Founded by Ann Pamela Cunningham in 1853 to salvage George Washington's residence Mount Vernon, the MVLA was the first major national historic preservation organization in the United States. Although Catherine Murat was the first Vice Regent for the state of Florida, Ellen Long was the principal organizer and cofounder of the Florida chapter of the MVLA and remained actively involved with the group for several years afterward. Despite the difficulties faced in communication and travel at the time, Long and Catherine Murat established a local presence for the MVLA in every town and county in the state and raised several thousand dollars for the cause. The success of the MVLA inspired the establishment of similar organizations around the country. In 1889, a group of Tennessee women concerned with the condition of Andrew Jackson's The Hermitage, established the LHA to aid in its restoration. The group named Ellen Call Long as the first vice regent for the state of Florida. For Ellen, whose father was a protégé of Jackson, the Hermitage held personal and national significance. As vice-regent, she had a significant role in early fundraising and organizing efforts for the LHA. She also donated several items from The Grove to The Hermitage and actively solicited donations on behalf of the LHA. Due in part to the pioneering efforts of women such as Ellen Call Long, both Mount Vernon and The Hermitage remain open today as public museums.

== Memorialization ==
After the Civil War, drawing inspiration from other southern cities, the Ladies Memorial Association of Tallahassee was founded in 1866. According to a history she wrote several years later, Long was offered the leadership to the organization when it formed but declined, citing a planned extended absence and her past as a unionist possibly interfering with the goals of the organization. Initially listed as a "foreign agent" of the organization, she would eventually take over as its president. It was the first group founded in Florida and one of the earliest in the Southern United States. Initially formed to reclaim Confederate burials and commemorate the Confederate dead, the women's memorial associations that formed in the Southern United States often held elaborate annual graveside ceremonies. These ceremonies usually involved laying flowers and wreaths on the headstones of Confederate veterans and served as the direct inspiration for what became Decoration Day in the north, now known as Memorial Day. The Ladies Memorial Association of Tallahassee primarily focused on erecting a monument memorializing Florida's Confederate casualties. Still, it soon expanded its mission to raise money for veterans, engage in public outreach, and petition for state recognition of Confederate Memorial Day. Beginning in 1867, a year after most other cities in the Southern United States established April 26 as memorial day, the women of the Tallahassee Association also adopted April 26 as an annual day of observance for the Confederate veterans in what was later called Confederate Memorial Day, which the state of Florida later recognized.

As Ellen Call Long later wrote of the Ladies Memorial Association: "Our purpose is purely religious – a labor of love – the sacred care of the dead, to reclaim from oblivion and defamation the memory and graves of those who, 'right or wrong,' stood by their country's cause... In no invidious spirit do we come; the political storm that shook our country to its foundation... is passed; war with its carnage is over; and we are done with the cause; and though we scarce discover the silver lining of the dark clouds which have so long hung like a pall above us, we believe that it will yet show itself, and are willing to do all that women can do to stem the tide of bitterness, and assuage the angry feelings that naturally, at present, exist between the two sections of the country."

== World's Fair delegate ==
After the American Civil War, Ellen Call Long earned a reputation as a tireless promoter of Florida and took the lead in encouraging national reconciliation in the state. She was able to use her family's political connections to secure several appointments to key expositions for herself and her family. Perhaps her most notable contribution was to the Centennial Exposition celebrated in Philadelphia in 1876. She saw this as an opportunity to rekindle the old bonds of nationalism that the war had destroyed. Her upbringing in the boarding schools of the north, most notably Philadelphia, gave her connections to several prominent families, which she used to her advantage. She received the appointment as Florida's delegate to the exhibition, but despite her best efforts, she could not generate much interest in the venture and received a lukewarm response from her fellow Floridians embittered by war and Reconstruction. However, her efforts did not go unnoticed, as she was widely commended for her tireless work with the exposition. She would later serve as a Florida delegate in the World Cotton Centennial (1884), the Exposition Universelle (1889), the World's Columbian Exposition (1893), and Tennessee Centennial (1897).

== Silkworm cultivation ==
Faced with maintaining a large extended family and a high standard of living as resources were dwindling, Ellen turned to alternative methods of generating income. She immersed herself in silkworm cultivation, studying for a period in the 1870s with the Women's Silk Culture Association in Philadelphia, which she joined and was an active member of. She raised the silkworms and produced the silk on The Grove property itself, first utilizing the first floor of the main house before constructing a small cottage near the cemetery. She published a silkworm cultivation book, Silk Farming, which was well received. She produced ceremonial silk flags for the 1885 gubernatorial inauguration of Florida governor Edward A. Perry. She also presented a silk flag made from silk grown at The Grove to the Board of Lady Managers at the 1893 Columbian Exposition, which was displayed in the Woman's Building.

== Forestry ==
Ellen Call Long was an early member of the Southern Forestry Congress, founded in DeFuniak Springs, Florida, at the annual Chautauqua Winter Conference in 1884. As a result of this group's efforts, Arbor Day first gained recognition in states throughout the Southern United States, including Florida. Long was appointed as Secretary of the group and was among the delegates present when they joined the American Forestry Congress in 1888. At the American Forestry Congress meeting held in Atlanta in 1888, she presented a paper titled "Notes of Some of the Forest Features of Florida," which was later published in the Proceedings. Describing fires as essential for the growth of longleaf pine forests in the Southern United States, it was one of the earliest published pieces to advocate for controlled burning when the accepted forestry standards called for total fire suppression. She went on the further draw the connection between the suppression of fire and the development of hardwood hammocks in lands that were once longleaf pine forests. Although the published piece received little attention then, it would be widely cited by early advocates of fire ecology, such as Roland Harper and Herbert Stoddard, as a seminal work in the field.

== Historian ==
Long's most notable work as a writer was Florida Breezes, a semi-fictional account set primarily in Antebellum Era Florida told from the perspective of a northern visitor visiting Tallahassee. The book, which never saw widespread publication upon its release in 1883, was unpopular due to its rejection of the morality of slavery and lionization of the Southern Unionist cause. Her public statements declaring Abraham Lincoln as one of the greatest presidents in American history and the open support of a local black postmaster also generated considerable local opposition. Extra copies of the publication were burned. In the years following her death, however, the book was looked upon as a valuable firsthand account of Middle Florida planter life. It was republished by the University of Florida in 1960.

Long was the author of several books and articles on various subjects. She wrote a history of Florida for the state school system, but it was rejected. Her work and research later went to her niece Caroline Mays Brevard, a noted historian and educator who wrote a history of Florida that was used for years as the official textbook for schoolchildren in the state.

By the end of her life, the debts accumulated from maintaining a large property and an expensive lifestyle caught up with Long. She began selling off portions of the lands around The Grove to a holding company. In 1906, the state Governor's Mansion was built on land originally part of The Grove property. In 1903, under threat of foreclosure on her properties, Long turned to her grandson-in-law, Charles E. Hunt. In exchange for being relieved of the debt on the property, Hunt received title to both The Grove and Orchard Pond. Realizing she was losing possession of the properties, Long later sued Hunt, claiming she misunderstood the nature of the arrangement. She was unsuccessful in getting her property back, and upon her death in 1905, the property went over to her granddaughter (Hunt's wife), Reinette Long Hunt.

== See also ==
- List of violent incidents involving Andrew Jackson § Other quarrels, evidently non-violent
