= Medicus Long =

American lawyer (died 1885)

Medicus A. Long (died September 22, 1885) was a lawyer from Tennessee who served one term in Tennessee's General Assembly. He spent a short time as a publisher in Tennessee. He married Ellen Call, Florida Territorial Governor Richard K. Call's daughter who became Ellen Call Long. They had four children but only the oldest and youngest children survived to adulthood: Richard Call Long and Eleanora Long Hollinger. He was a secessionist.
