= Caroline Mays Brevard =

American historian (1860–1920)

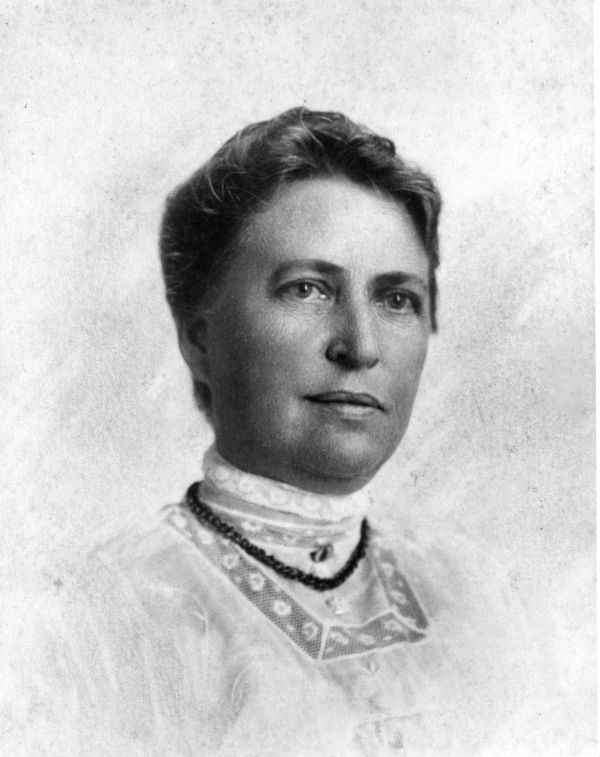
- Born: August 29, 1860; Tallahassee, Florida, U.S.
- Died: 1920
- Education: Columbia University
- Occupations: historian, educator, author
- Parent(s): Theodore W. Brevard, Jr. Mary Laura Call
- Relatives: Ellen Call Long (aunt); Wilkinson Call (cousin); David S. Walker (cousin)

Caroline Mays Brevard (1860–1920) was an educator, historian and author in Brevard County, Florida. She was a history professor at Florida State College for Women (now part of Florida State University) She was added to the List of Great Floridians in 2012. She was a member of the Florida Historical Society and the group maintains a Caroline Mays Brevard Award in her honor.

Brevard was born at her aunt's residence at The Grove in Tallahassee on August 29, 1860. She was the daughter of Theodore Washington Brevard, Jr. and Mary Laura Call and the granddaughter of Florida Territorial Governor Richard Keith Call.

Brevard graduated from Columbia University and then returned home to Tallahassee, where she taught at Leon High School.

She wrote and published A History and Government of Florida in 1904. The book became a required textbook in Florida schools until the 1920s, when it was removed from classrooms because of its inaccurate portrayal of African-Americans and the Civil War.

In 1915, Brevard began teaching at the Florida State College for Women.

A large elementary school was built in 1924 in Tallahassee named Caroline Brevard Grammar School. It is now part of the Bloxham Building.

== Bibliography ==
- A history of Florida American book company 1904
- A history of Florida from the treaty of 1763 to our own times (DeLand, Fla.: The Florida State Historical Society, 1924–25)
- Literature of the South New York, Broadway Publishing, circa 1908
