= 1868 Rhode Island gubernatorial election =

- April 1, 1868
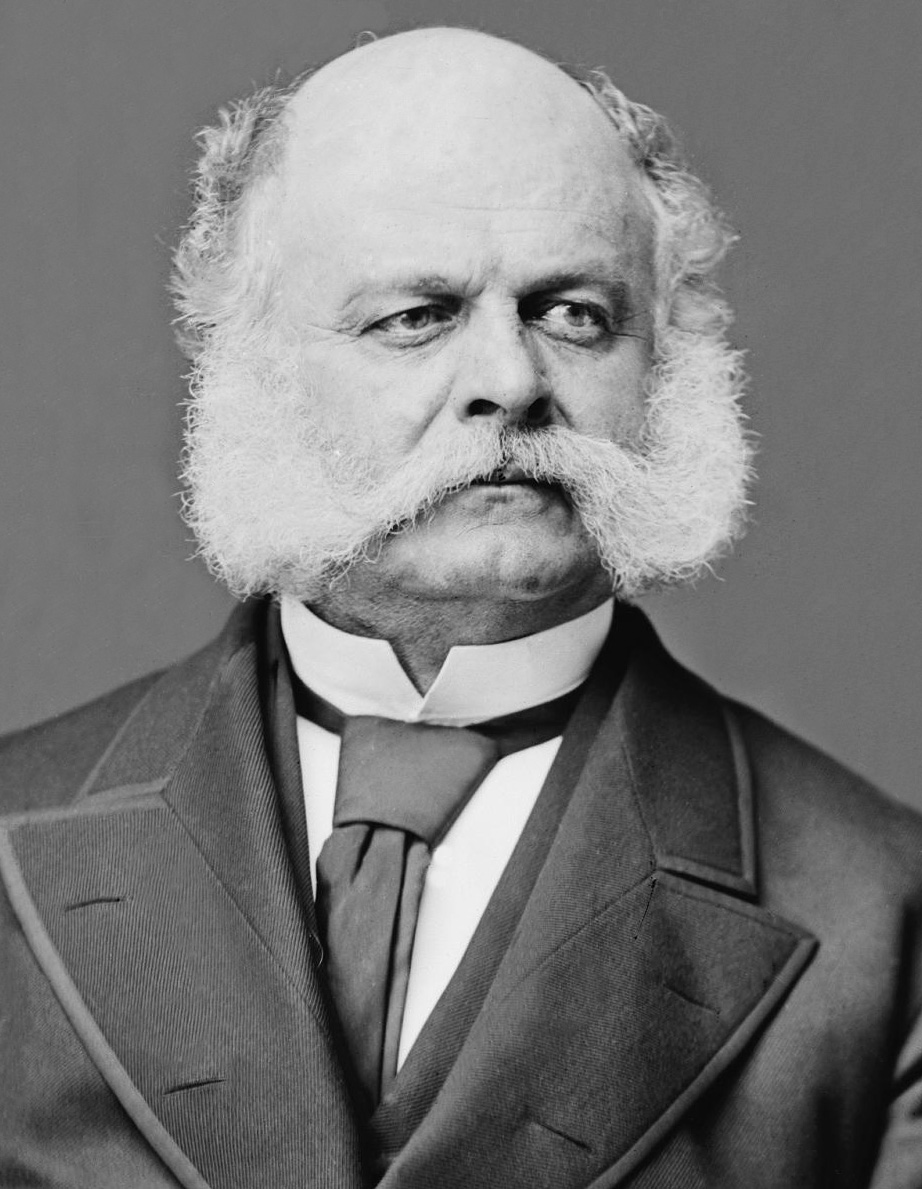

Nominee	Ambrose Burnside	Lyman Pierce
Party	Republican	Democratic
Popular vote	10,038	5,731
Percentage	63.61%	36.32%
- County results Burnside: 60–70% 80–90%
Governor before election
Ambrose Burnside
Republican
Elected Governor
Ambrose Burnside
Republican

The 1868 Rhode Island gubernatorial election was held on April 1, 1868, in order to elect the governor of Rhode Island. Incumbent Republican governor Ambrose Burnside won re-election against Democratic nominee Lyman Pierce in a rematch of the 1866 and 1867 election.

== General election ==
On election day, April 1, 1868, incumbent Republican governor Ambrose Burnside won re-election by a margin of 6,648 votes against his opponent Democratic nominee Lyman Pierce, thereby retaining Republican control over the office of Governor. Burnside was sworn in for his third term on May 4, 1868.

=== Results ===
Rhode Island gubernatorial election, 1868
Party	Candidate	Votes	%
Republican	Ambrose Burnside (incumbent)	10,038	63.61
Democratic	Lyman Pierce	5,731	36.32
	Scattering	11	0.07
Total votes		15,780	100.00
Republican hold			
