= Mary Call Darby Collins =

First Lady of Florida

Mary Call Collins
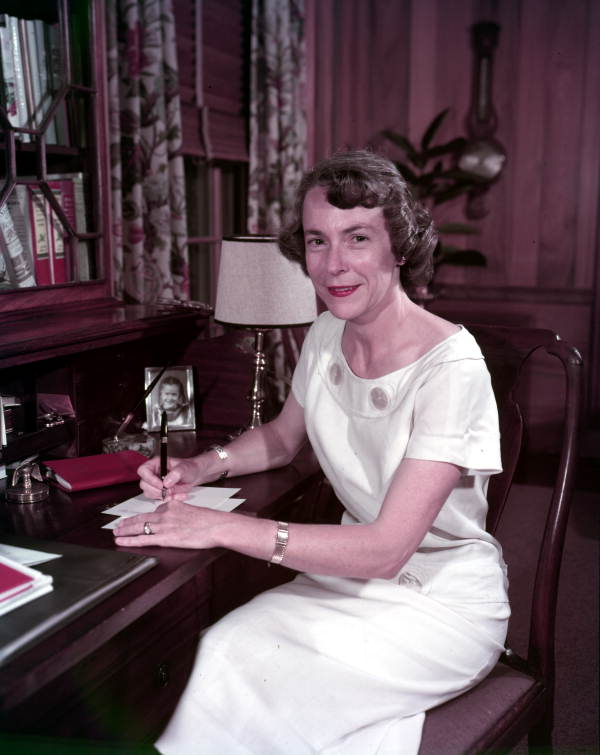

First Lady of Florida
- In role January 4, 1955 – January 3, 1961
- Governor: LeRoy Collins
- Preceded by: Thelma Brinson Johns
- Succeeded by: Julia Burnett Bryant

Personal details
- Born: Mary Call Darby; September 11, 1911 New York City, U.S.
- Died: November 29, 2009 (aged 98) Tallahassee, Florida, U.S.
- Resting place: Call Family Cemetery (The Grove Plantation), Tallahassee, Florida, U.S.
- Party: Democratic
- Spouse: LeRoy Collins (m. 1932)

Mary Call Darby Collins (September 11, 1911 – November 29, 2009) was an American historic preservationist who was the first lady of Florida from 1955 to 1961 as the wife of Governor LeRoy Collins.

== Early years ==
Mary Call was born in New York City, New York, the only child and daughter of Thomas Arthur Darby and Jane Kirkman Brevard. Brevard being the daughter of Theodore Washington Brevard Jr. and Mary Laura Call. Mary Laura Call was the daughter of Richard Keith Call, 3rd and 5th territorial governor of Florida and Mary Letitia Kirkman.

Mary Call was born in New York because her father had business interests there. However, concerned for her health in the harsh northern winters, Jane Darby and Mary moved to Tallahassee and the Brevard family home of her maternal grandmother, Mary Call Brevard, and her Aunt Caroline Mays Brevard on Monroe Street. Thomas Darby visited his wife and daughter often and planned to establish a home for them in Tallahassee when circumstances permitted him to leave New York.

When Mary Call was nine years old, her best friend and first cousin, Cora, died following a fall from a tree. In 1920 both Mary Call Brevard and Aunt Caroline died from the Spanish flu epidemic.

In 1923, Thomas Darby was found dead in his New York hotel room at age 66. His business partner then took the proceeds of their successful business and boarded a ship for Europe. The ship was lost at sea with all hands.

Mary Call attended Leon High School and appeared as "The Fairy Queen" in a 1916 May Party picture in the history book. Mary Call met Thomas LeRoy "Roy" Collins, whom she later married. Mary Call went on to Florida State College for Women but temporarily withdrew in order to help take care of her mother who was ill with cancer. In February 1932, Jane Brevard Darby died at the age of 64. Mary Call moved in with Uncle Ephraim and Aunt Bess Brevard. On June 29, 1932 Mary Call married LeRoy Collins at St. John's Episcopal Church in Tallahassee. Mary Call returned to college and graduated.

In 1942, the Collins family acquired The Grove Plantation, a circa 1840 plantation home originally built by Mary Collins' great grandfather Richard Keith Call.

== Children and grandchildren ==
LeRoy and Mary Call Collins had 4 children: Roy Jr., Jane Aurell, Mary Call Proctor and Darby Collins and 12 grandchildren, including John Brevard, a designer and architect.

== Mary Call Darby Collins Award ==
The Mary Call Darby Collins Award, one of three historic preservation awards from the Florida Secretary of State's office is presented to a volunteer who has forever changed the course of historic preservation. (In the 1970s, Mary Call Collins had served, by gubernatorial appointment, as a member of the Historic St. Augustine Preservation Board.)

== Death ==
Mary Call Darby Collins died at the age of 98, after a long illness. At this time, she was still living in her great-grandfather's home, which the State of Florida is considering turning into a historic museum.
