= Robert R. Reid =

American judge

Robert Raymond Reid
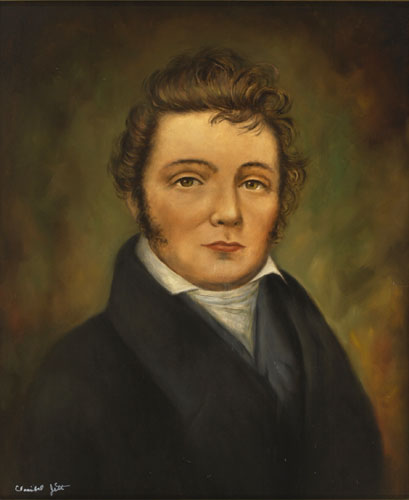

Territorial Governor of Florida
- In office December 2, 1839 – March 19, 1841
- Appointed by: Martin Van Buren
- Preceded by: Richard K. Call
- Succeeded by: Richard K. Call

Member of the U.S. House of Representatives from Georgia's at-large district
- In office February 18, 1819 – March 3, 1823
- Preceded by: John Forsyth
- Succeeded by: John Forsyth

Personal details
- Born: October 8, 1789 Prince William Parish, Beaufort District, South Carolina, U.S.
- Died: July 1, 1841 (aged 51) Tallahassee, Florida, U.S.
- Party: Democratic Party
- Spouse(s): Anna Margaret McClaws (d. 1825), Elizabeth Napier D. Randolph (d. 1832/3), Mary Martha Smith
- Children: Janet, James, Florida, Rosalie, Robert Raymond III, Raymond "Jenks"
- Occupation: Attorney

Robert Raymond Reid (September 8, 1789 – July 1, 1841) was the fourth territorial governor of Florida. Earlier in his career he was a Representative from Georgia and held several judicial positions.

Robert Reid was born in Prince William Parish, Beaufort District, South Carolina, in 1789. He was educated at the University of South Carolina and studied and practiced law in Augusta, Georgia. Reid began public service at age 27 as a judge and later served Georgia as an at-large Representative from Georgia to the 15th, 16th, and 17th United States Congresses and served from February 18, 1819, to March 3, 1823. He also held several judicial positions including judge in the superior court of Georgia, circuit court judge for Middle Georgia, city judge for Augusta, Georgia. In May 1832, he was appointed United States judge for the district of East Florida by U.S. President Andrew Jackson.

Reid's life was marked by personal tragedy. He married three times, was widowed twice and lost numerous children and grandchildren. With his first wife Anna Margaret McClaws, whom he married in 1811, Reid had five children: Janet, James, Florida, Rosalie, and Robert Raymond III. Anna Margaret McClaws died in 1825. Children Janet and James both drowned in a sailing accident in 1839. His second marriage was to Elizabeth Napier D. Randolph in 1829. She died in childbirth in 1832. In 1836, he married Mary Martha Reid, who later became known for her nursing work during the American Civil War. They had two sons, William and Reymond "Jenks."

U.S. President Martin Van Buren appointed Reid governor of Florida in December 1839. Reid presided at the convention that drafted Florida's first constitution and advocated a vigorous prosecution of the Second Seminole War.

He died at his home in Blackwood near Tallahassee, Florida, on July 1, 1841, a victim of a yellow fever epidemic. His granddaughter Rebecca Black and her daughter Janet Black were also victims of the 1841 yellow fever epidemic that struck Florida's Panhandle.

U.S. House of Representatives
Preceded by John Forsyth	Member of the U.S. House of Representatives from Georgia's at-large congressional district February 18, 1819 – March 3, 1823	Succeeded by John Forsyth
Political offices
Preceded by Richard K. Call	Territorial Governor of Florida; 1839–1841	Succeeded by Richard K. Call
