= Orchard Pond Plantation =

Forced-labor farm in Leon County, Florida

Coordinates: 30.6045°N 84.2998°W

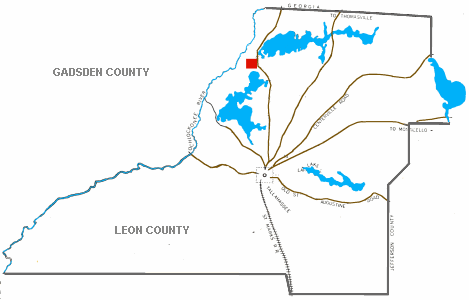
General location of Orchard Pond Plantation

Orchard Pond Plantation was a large forced-labor farm originally growing cotton on 8754 acres, (35 1/2 km^{2}) developed and owned in the 19th century by Richard Keith Call, attorney, planter and future Territorial Governor, in what is now northwestern Leon County, Florida, United States. In 1860 he owned 118 slaves to work the 1300 acres of improved land.

It was one of two plantations which Call owned in Leon County. His descendants owned these properties into the 20th century.

== Location ==
The exact boundaries of Orchard Pond Plantation are not available. Orchard Pond lay between Lake Jackson and the Ochlockonee River to the west. The land is bisected east to west by Orchard Pond Road, a rural county dirt road, that in 2016 was replaced by the Orchard Pond Parkway.

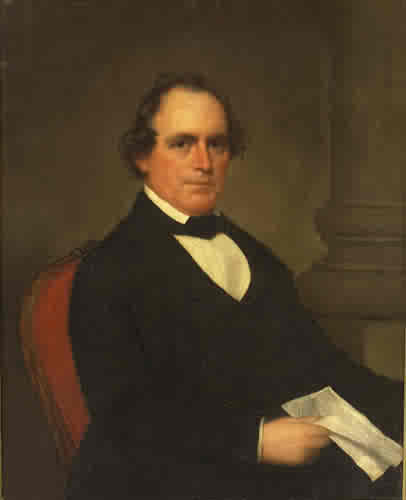
Richard Keith Call gubernatorial portrait

== Plantation specifics ==
The Leon County Florida 1860 Agricultural Census shows that Orchard Pond Plantation had the following:

- Improved Land: 1300 acres (5 km²)
- Unimproved Land: 2544 acres (10 km²)
- Cash value of plantation: $31,000
- Cash value of farm implements/machinery: $300
- Cash value of farm animals: $4000
- Number of slaves: 118
- Bushels of corn: 4500
- Bales of cotton: 167

According to data in the United States Census of 1860, Richard Keith Call was the third-largest slaveholder in Leon County. His Orchard Pond Plantation eventually was reduced in size to 2644 acres (11 km²). Call transferred his other plantation, The Grove in Tallahassee, to his daughter. Call began to concentrate on agricultural experiments such as Florida hemp and livestock improvements.

== The owners ==
Richard Keith Call was born October 24, 1792, in Tennessee. Call became a friend and assistant of General Andrew Jackson and accompanied him to Florida. His capital was made by speculation in the land office and he promoted land in Leon County to northerners. He developed two plantations in the county, one of nearly 9,000 acres, and the other, The Grove, of one square mile.

Call, a Democrat, was appointed as Governor of the Florida Territory from 1836 to 1839. He later became a Whig and was appointed as governor again by the winning presidential candidate. His property later passed to Call's daughter Ellen Call Long, who owned it until 1903; that year her granddaughter Reinette Long Hunt purchased the Orchard Pond property along with The Grove. Hunt would later sell the property to Dr. Tennent Ronalds, the only surviving son of Dr. Edmund Ronalds and an obstetrician. A keen sportsman, he took an active interest in developing a quail hunting operation.

Orchard Pond was purchased by John H. Phipps, who later used it for his residence. Upon his death it became combined homes and interests of Colin Phipps and his grandson John E. Phipps, who was given 2,100 acres (8.5 km^{2}) on Ox Bottom Road.

See: Ayavalla Plantation

Orchard Pond is currently owned by Ayavalla Land Company. It contains some of the most diverse wetlands in the Red Hills Region, with flowing streams, isolated lakes, and river floodplain and swamps.

== Photo gallery ==
Various views of Orchard Pond's plantation house, a 2-story brick home with 8 support columns, 4 for each floor.

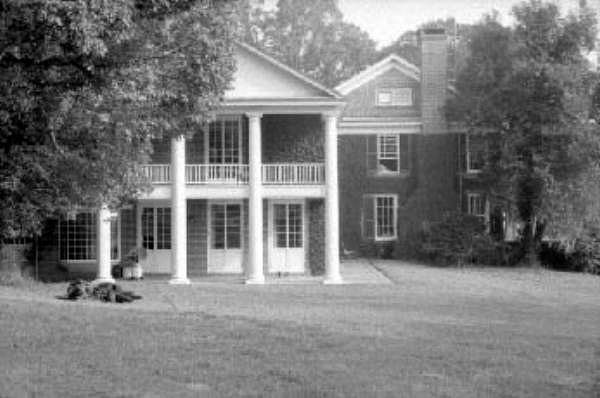

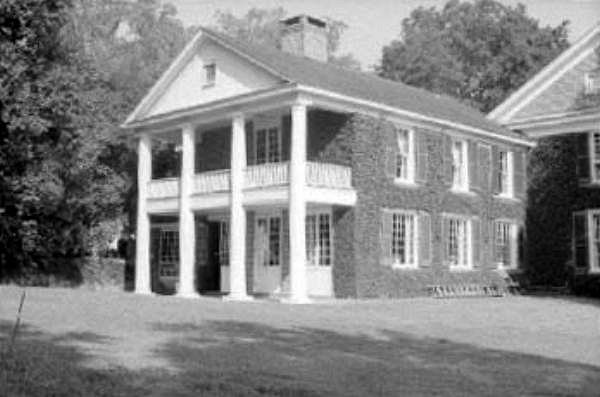
