= Mary Martha Reid =

American nurse (1812–1894)

Mary Martha Reid (September 19, 1812 – June 24, 1894) is Florida's "most famous nurse and Confederate heroine." She is best known for serving as the matron of the Florida Hospital, founded in Richmond, Virginia in 1862 to treat convalescing Confederate soldiers from Florida. Her husband, Robert Raymond Reid, served as the territorial governor of Florida from 1839 to 1841.

Mary Reid was born in St. Mary's, Georgia, to James and Mary Thorpe Smith. She married Robert Reid, who was a federal judge, on November 29, 1836, after meeting him during a visit to St. Augustine, Florida earlier that year. They had two sons, William and Raymond. Her husband died in 1841, and their son William died the following year. Following her husband's death, Reid worked as a schoolteacher in Jacksonville and Fernandina.

Her surviving son, Raymond, enlisted in the 2nd Florida Infantry, on May 23, 1861, and Mary Martha Reid's wish to be near him made her a nurse. Together with Dr. Thomas M. Palmer, Mary Martha Reid opened a 150-bed hospital in Richmond in September 1862 to treat Confederate soldiers from Florida. With Reid serving as its matron, the hospital treated over a thousand men in its first year of operation. Her requests for donations and supplies as well as letters of thanks to organizations that contributed aid to the hospital were printed in Florida newspapers, and her nursing work earned her the nickname, "Mother of the Florida Boys." Lt. Raymond Reid died of wounds received in the Battle of the Wilderness on May 7, 1864. He was buried by his mother in Richmond.

The first Florida chapter of United Daughters of the Confederacy was named in Mary Reid's honor.
