= 1868 Florida gubernatorial election =

- May 4, 1868
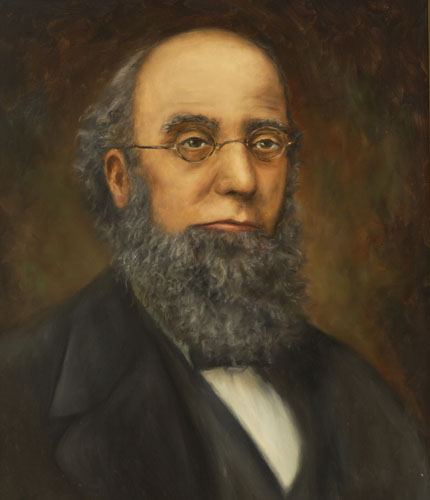

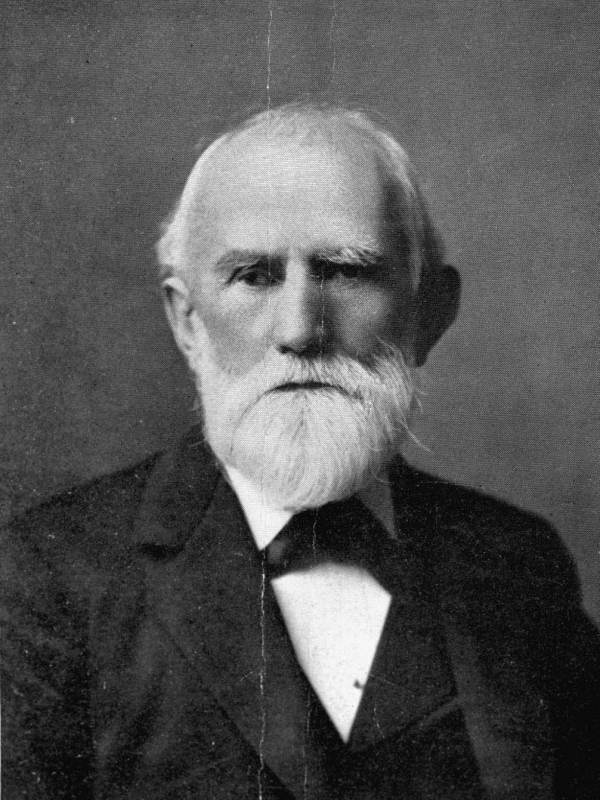

Nominee	Harrison Reed	George W. Scott	Samuel Walker
Party	Republican	Democratic	Radical Republican
Popular vote	14,421	7,731	2,251
Percentage	59.10%	31.68%	9.22%
County results
Reed
50–60%
60–70%
70–80%
80–90%
>90%
Scott
50–60%
60–70%
70–80%
80–90%
Walker
40–50%
50–60%
70–80%
Tie
Governor before election
David S. Walker
Democratic
Elected Governor
Harrison Reed
Republican

The 1868 Florida gubernatorial election was held on May 4, 1868. Republican nominee Harrison Reed defeated the Democratic nominee George W. Scott in a landslide. This stood as the best Republican gubernatorial performance, in terms of total percentage of the vote, in state history until 2022.

== General election ==
=== Candidates ===
- Harrison Reed, U.S. postal agent in Florida (Republican)
- George W. Scott, former Confederate Lieutenant colonel (Democratic)
- Samuel Walker, former Monroe County prosecutor (Radical Republican)

=== Results ===
1868 Florida gubernatorial election
Party	Candidate	Votes	%	±%
Republican	Harrison Reed	14,421	59.10%	
Democratic	George W. Scott	7,731	31.68%	
Radical Republican	Samuel Walker	2,251	9.22%	

==== Results by county ====
County	George W. Scott Democratic		Harrison Reed Republican		Samuel Walker Radical Republican		Total votes
County	#	%	#	%	#	%	Total votes
Alachua	234	13.27%	1,528	86.67%	1	0.06%	1,763
Baker	75	50.00%	75	50.00%	0	0.00%	150
Bradford	171	62.18%	104	37.82%	0	0.00%	275
Brevard	0	0.00%	5	100.00%	0	0.00%	5
Calhoun	141	66.82%	70	33.18%	0	0.00%	211
Clay	15	10.14%	118	79.73%	15	10.14%	148
Columbia	260	27.78%	676	72.22%	0	0.00%	936
Dade	5	33.33%	10	66.67%	0	0.00%	15
Duval	440	34.87%	146	11.57%	676	53.57%	1,262
Escambia	229	21.75%	824	78.25%	0	0.00%	1,053
Franklin	173	61.57%	108	38.43%	0	0.00%	281
Gadsden	640	36.61%	1,108	63.39%	0	0.00%	1,748
Hamilton	364	52.15%	315	45.13%	19	2.72%	698
Hernando	91	31.82%	195	68.18%	0	0.00%	286
Hillsborough	166	58.87%	116	41.13%	0	0.00%	282
Holmes	80	64.52%	44	35.48%	0	0.00%	124
Jackson	561	29.50%	1,340	70.45%	1	0.05%	1,902
Jefferson	539	25.00%	1,616	74.95%	1	0.05%	2,156
Lafayette	35	22.01%	124	77.99%	0	0.00%	159
Leon	457	15.97%	1,096	38.31%	1,308	45.72%	2,861
Levy	81	48.80%	85	51.20%	0	0.00%	166
Liberty	97	52.43%	88	47.57%	0	0.00%	124
Madison	515	28.53%	1,288	71.36%	2	0.11%	1,805
Manatee	17	26.56%	47	73.44%	0	0.00%	64
Marion	223	16.31%	1,144	83.69%	0	0.00%	1,367
Monroe	312	58.21%	224	41.79%	0	0.00%	536
Nassau	56	17.07%	34	10.37%	238	72.56%	328
Orange	107	74.31%	37	25.69%	0	0.00%	144
Polk	106	84.80%	19	15.20%	0	0.00%	125
Putnam	198	42.31%	270	57.69%	0	0.00%	468
Santa Rosa	188	42.44%	255	57.56%	0	0.00%	443
St. Johns	263	63.53%	151	36.47%	0	0.00%	414
Sumter	111	52.11%	102	47.89%	0	0.00%	213
Suwannee	148	35.75%	266	64.25%	0	0.00%	414
Taylor	94	52.11%	88	48.09%	1	0.55%	183
Volusia	86	56.58%	36	23.68%	30	19.74%	152
Wakulla	162	38.48%	259	61.52%	0	0.00%	421
Walton	203	80.88%	48	19.12%	0	0.00%	251
Washington	189	63.64%	108	36.36%	0	0.00%	297
Actual totals	7,832	32.24%	14,167	58.32%	2,292	9.44%	24,291
Official totals	7,731	31.67%	14,421	59.08%	2,257	9.25%	24,409

Counties that flipped from Democratic to Republican

- Alachua
- Brevard
- Clay
- Columbia
- Dade
- Escambia
- Gadsden
- Hernando
- Jackson
- Jefferson
- Lafayette
- Levy
- Manatee
- Madison
- Marion
- Putnam
- Santa Rosa
- Suwannee
- Wakulla

Counties that flipped from Democratic to Radical Republican

- Duval
- Leon
- Nassau

Counties that flipped from Democratic to Tied

- Baker
