= 1867 Rhode Island gubernatorial election =

- April 3, 1867
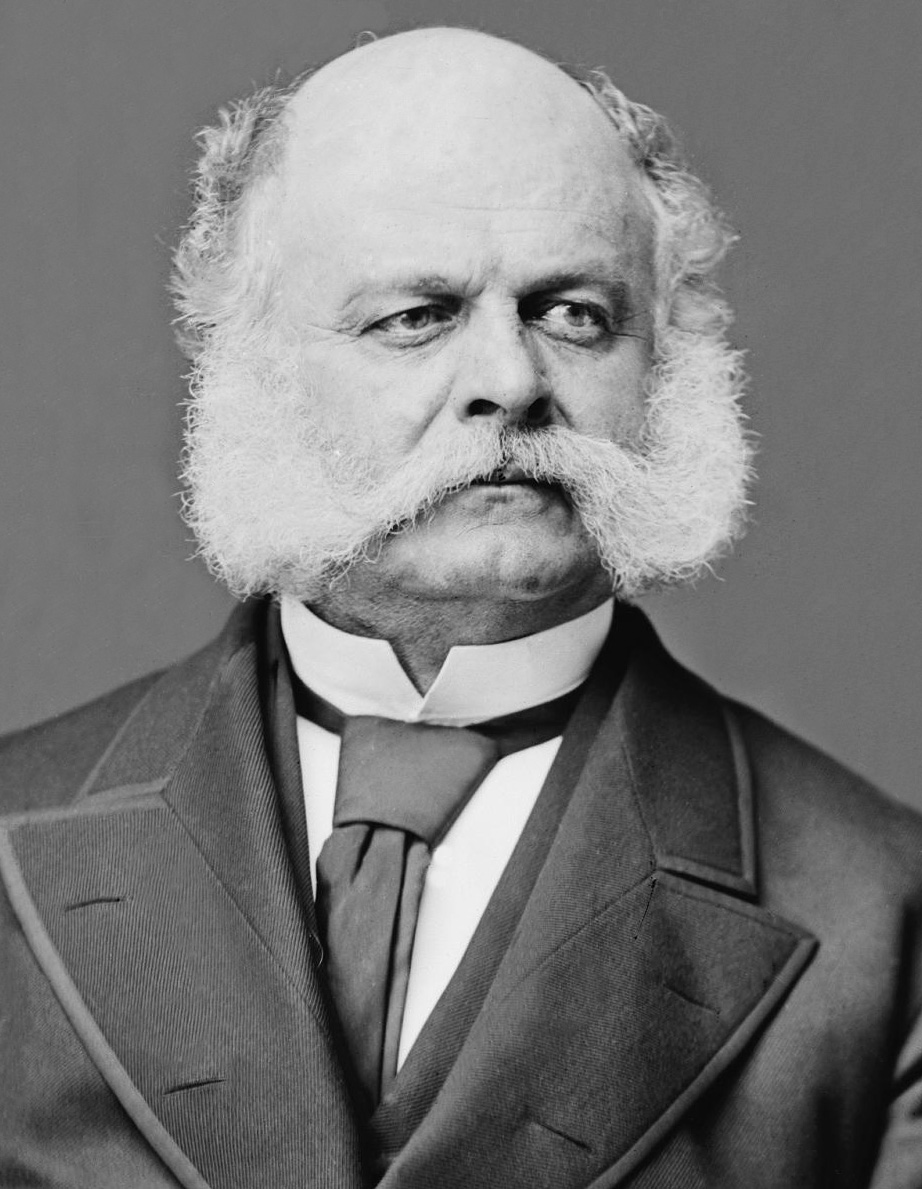

Nominee	Ambrose Burnside	Lyman Pierce
Party	Republican	Democratic
Popular vote	7,372	3,178
Percentage	69.84%	30.11%
- County results Burnside: 60–70% 70–80%
Governor before election
Ambrose Burnside
Republican
Elected Governor
Ambrose Burnside
Republican

The 1867 Rhode Island gubernatorial election was held on April 3, 1867, in order to elect the governor of Rhode Island. Incumbent Republican governor Ambrose Burnside won re-election against Democratic nominee Lyman Pierce in a rematch of the previous election.

== General election ==
On election day, April 3, 1867, incumbent Republican governor Ambrose Burnside won re-election by a margin of 4,194 votes against his opponent Democratic nominee Lyman Pierce, thereby retaining Republican control over the office of governor. Burnside was sworn in for his second term on May 4, 1867.

=== Results ===
Rhode Island gubernatorial election, 1867
Party	Candidate	Votes	%
Republican	Ambrose Burnside (incumbent)	7,372	69.84
Democratic	Lyman Pierce	3,178	30.11
	Scattering	6	0.05
Total votes		10,556	100.00
Republican hold			
