= 1868 Nebraska gubernatorial election =

- October 13, 1868

Nominee	David Butler	James R. Porter
Party	Republican	Democratic
Popular vote	8,567	6,349
Percentage	57.43%	42.56%
- County results Butler: 50–60% 60–70% 70–80% 80–90% Porter: 50–60% 60–70% 80–90% 90–100% Tie: 50% No Data/Votes
Governor before election
David Butler
Republican
Elected Governor
David Butler
Republican

The 1868 Nebraska gubernatorial election was held on October 13, 1868. (Note: The Nebraska Constitution of 1866 specified in Article III, Section 1, that the governor and all executive officers were to be elected on the second Tuesday in October.) Incumbent Governor of Nebraska David Butler, the Republican nominee, was seeking reelection. He was opposed by Democratic nominee James Ralston Porter, (Note: Due to a transcription error in some sources from the time, including some editions of the Nebraska Blue Book, James Ralston Porter ("J. R. Porter") is mistakenly referred to as "T. R. Porter.") founder of J.R. Porter & Company.

== General election ==
=== Candidates ===
- David Butler, Republican candidate, incumbent Governor of Nebraska
- James Ralston Porter, Democratic candidate, owner and founder of J.R. Porter & Company, which ran a freighting operation between Plattsmouth, Nebraska and Kearney, Nebraska, Denver, Colorado, and Laramie, Wyoming

=== Results ===
Nebraska gubernatorial election, 1868
Party	Candidate	Votes	%
Republican	David Butler	8,567	57.43%
Democratic	James R. Porter	6,349	42.56%
Scattering		1	
Total votes		14,917	100.0%
Republican hold			
