= 1868 Illinois gubernatorial election =

- November 3, 1868
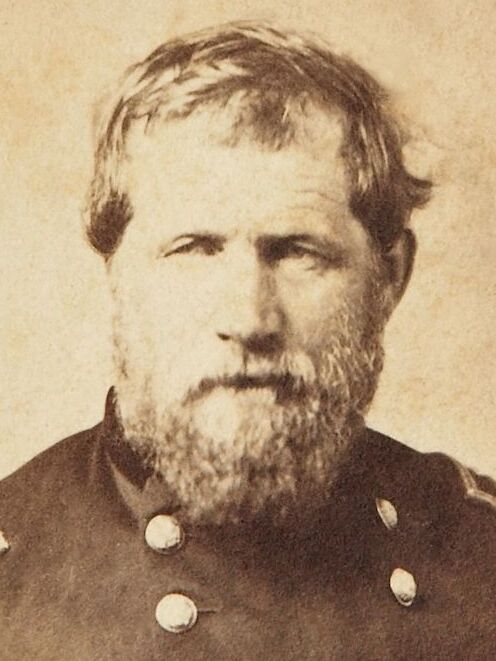

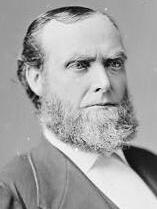
Nominee	John M. Palmer	John R. Eden
Party	Republican	Democratic
Popular vote	249,912	199,813
Percentage	55.57%	44.43%
- County results Palmer: 50–60% 60–70% 70–80% 80–90% Eden: 50–60% 60–70%
Governor before election
Richard J. Oglesby
Republican
Elected Governor
John M. Palmer
Republican

The 1868 Illinois gubernatorial election was held on November 3, 1868. Republican nominee John M. Palmer defeated the Democratic nominee John R. Eden.

== General election ==
=== Candidates ===
- John R. Eden, former U.S. representative from Sullivan (Democratic)
- John M. Palmer, former U.S. Army major general and state senator from Carlinville (Republican)

=== Results ===
1868 gubernatorial election, Illinois
Party	Candidate	Votes	%	±%
Republican	John M. Palmer	249,912	55.57%	+1.03%
Democratic	John R. Eden	199,813	44.43%	−1.03%
Majority		50,099	11.14%	+2.06%
Turnout		449,725		
Republican hold		Swing		

== See also ==
- 1868 Illinois lieutenant gubernatorial election
