= John Brevard =

American artist

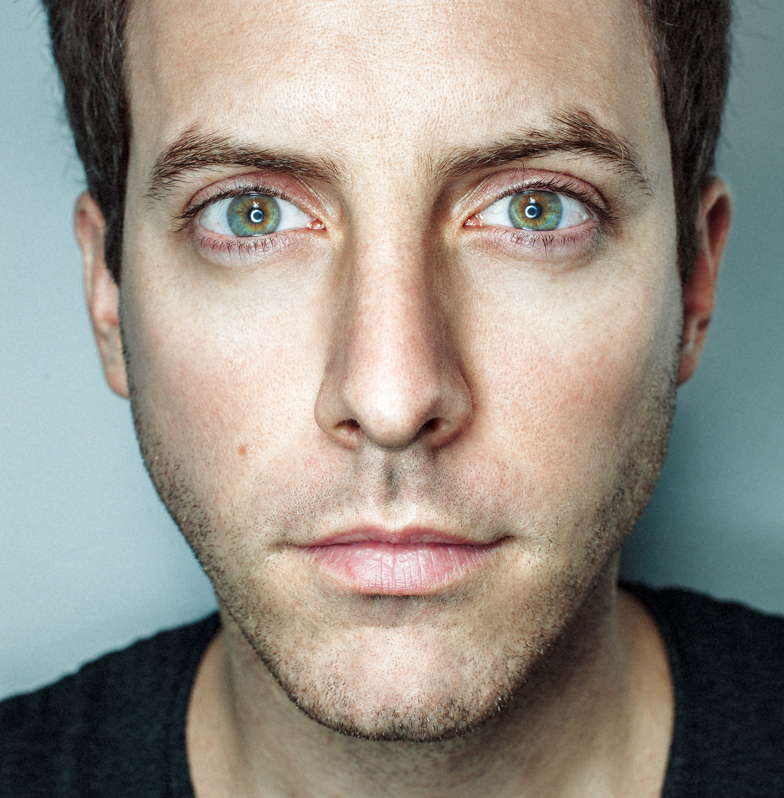
- Brevard in 2014

John Brevard is an American designer, architect, developer, and investor. Brevard applies his background in architecture and multidisciplinary arts to create designs that are both visually appealing and conceptually meaningful. Inspired by the principles of sacred geometry, John Brevard's creations feature fractal patterns found in nature and organic and man-made materials, and are symbolic of the inseparable relationship of the part to the whole. His designs are expressed in different physical scales across many creative mediums, from jewelry to furniture, from sculpture to architecture.

== Early life and education ==
As a child, Brevard was drawn to nature, design, and the arts. At the age of 14, John Brevard contracted encephalitis and meningitis leading to a near death experience. This left him in a coma for several weeks, and was followed by seizures and flat-line experiences. He lost all his memory prior to the coma, and to this day claims this experience to be a catalyst for his design philosophy and work ethic. After this experience, he started questioning the nature of human existence and looked at art and design as an outlet for self-expression. After graduating with degrees in architecture and design, Brevard created designs and artwork to express these experiences.

== Career ==
John Brevard's namesake brand includes jewelry, furniture, sculpture, art, and architecture design, as well as custom shoes and handbags. Brevard's designs are expressed in six series based on natural geometries and phenomenology. The combined forms of the first five series (Fabri, Orthofract, Verahedra, Morphogen, and Spherical) coalesce into sixth series, Singularity, whose theme reflects the unity of past, presence, and future.

John Brevard's first gallery opened in Miami's Wynwood arts district in 2009, showcasing his custom furniture and sculptures. In 2012, Brevard opened his second showroom in Miami's Design District, where he launched his fine jewelry and accessories collections. He opened his permanent, appointment-only showroom and atelier in Coral Gables, Florida in 2013. Shortly thereafter, Brevard opened his first flagship store in New York City. Brevard was inducted into the Council of Fashion Designers of America (CFDA) in 2015. In addition, Brevard is currently the architect, Creative Director, and co-developer for a Six Senses hotel slated to open in Iceland in 2022.

In August 2010, Brevard opened a pop-up showroom in the Wynwood arts district in Miami, Florida, showcasing his custom art and sculptures. The showroom was listed "Best of Miami" in 2010 by the Miami New Times.

In November 2012, Brevard opened his second pop-up showroom in Miami's Design District, where he launched his first luxury jewelry line.

In 2013, Brevard designed his first women's line of shoes, which have been sold to private clients as one-of-a-kind creations. He also opened his permanent, appointment-only showroom and atelier in Coral Gables, Florida in 2013.

In July 2015, Brevard opened his flagship store in New York City and was inducted into the Council of Fashion Designers of America (CFDA).

In 2015, Brevard launched the Thoscene customization platform, a tool that uses parametric modeling software and astrological algorithms to create one-of-a-kind jewelry and accessories that are based on personal inputs such as time, date, and location of birth.

John Brevard's designs have been exhibited in leading galleries and retail institutions around the world, including 1stdibs, MAC Fine Art Gallery, Soho House, Matches Fashion, Maxfield LA, The Alchemist, The Webster, FIVESTORY, Oxygene Bal Harbour, The Vault, Timeless at the Fontainebleau Hotel, and Steven Alan. Brevard's fine jewelry collection has been featured in publications such as Vogue, Elle, W, Financial Times, HauteLiving, and Schon Magazine, as well as on many celebrities. John Brevard has exhibited in collaboration with Marchesa in Dubai and Saudi Arabia, hosted by Princess Reema bint Bandar Al Saud, current Saudi Ambassador to the USA.

Brevard is currently the architect, Creative Director, and co-developer for Six Senses Össurá Valley, a hotel slated to open in Iceland in 2022.

Brevard lives between Miami and New York City.

== Family ==
Brevard's grandfather was Governor Leroy Collins. His grandmother, First Lady of Florida Mary Call Darby Collins, was an American historic preservationist.
