= 1868 Illinois lieutenant gubernatorial election =

- November 3, 1868
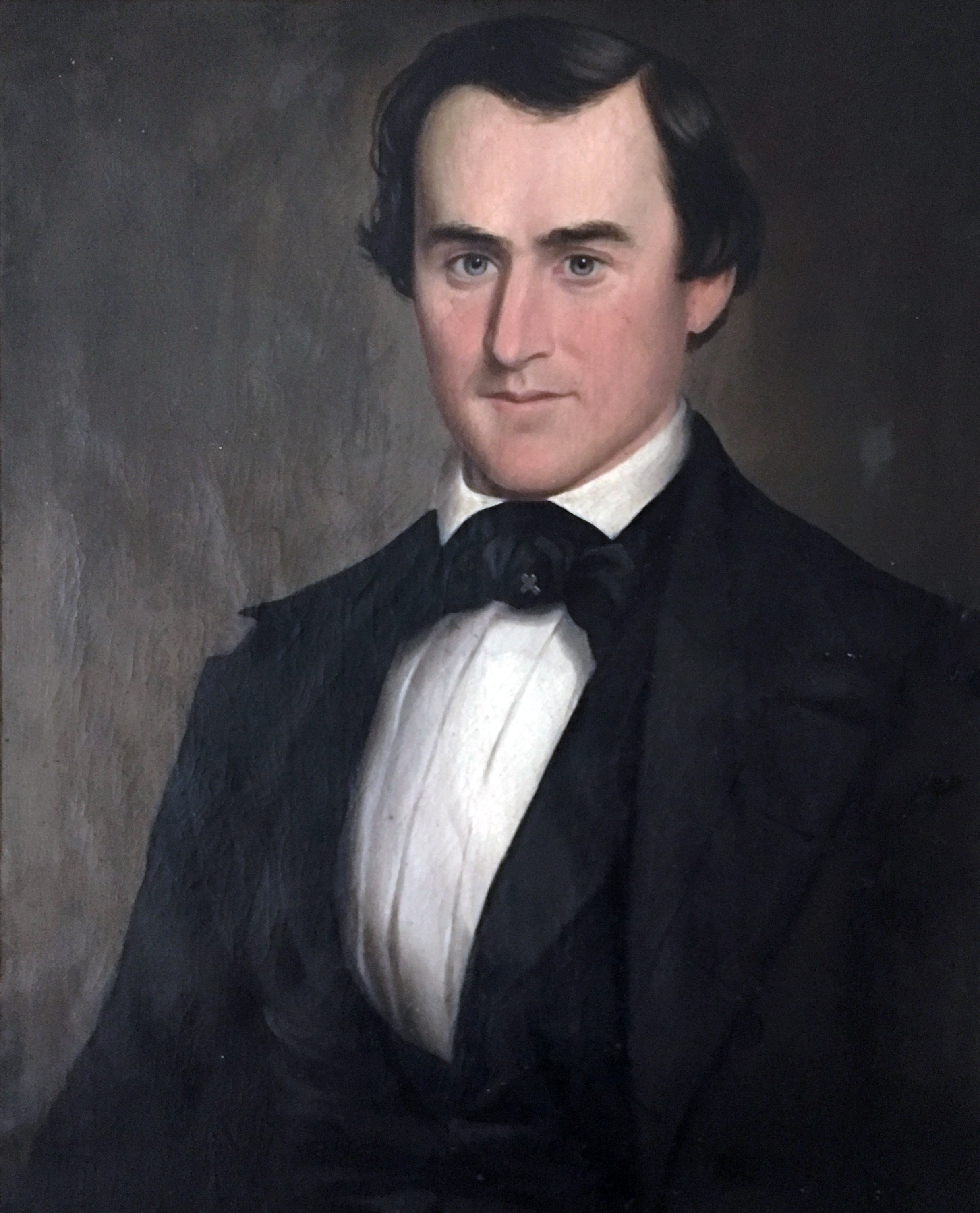

Nominee	John Dougherty	William Henri Van Epps
Party	Republican	Democratic
Popular vote	249,874	199,860
Percentage	55.56%	44.44%
Lieutenant Governor before election
William Bross
Republican
Elected Lieutenant Governor
John Dougherty
Republican

The 1868 Illinois lieutenant gubernatorial election was held on November 3, 1868, in order to elect the lieutenant governor of Illinois. Republican nominee and former member of the Illinois Senate John Dougherty defeated Democratic nominee William Henri Van Epps.

== General election ==
On election day, November 3, 1868, Republican nominee John Dougherty won the election by a margin of 50,014 votes against his opponent Democratic nominee William Henri Van Epps, thereby retaining Republican control over the office of lieutenant governor. Dougherty was sworn in as the 17th lieutenant governor of Illinois on January 3, 1869.

=== Results ===
Illinois lieutenant gubernatorial election, 1868
Party	Candidate	Votes	%
Republican	John Dougherty	249,874	55.56
Democratic	William Henri Van Epps	199,860	44.44
Total votes		449,734	100.00
Republican hold			

== See also ==
- 1868 Illinois gubernatorial election
