= The Grove Plantation =

- U.S. National Register of Historic Places
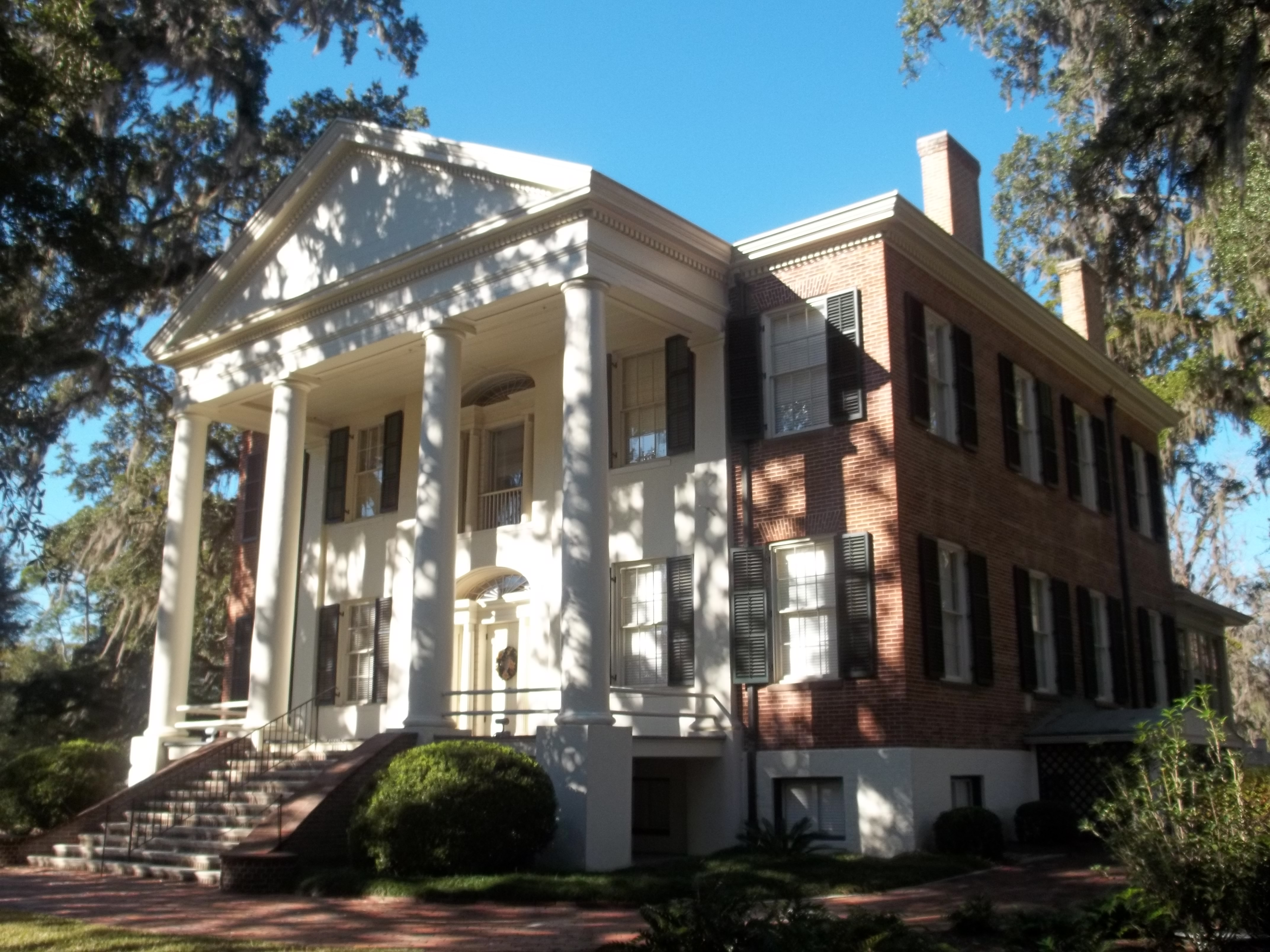
- The Grove in 2019

- Location within Florida Location within the United States
- Location: Leon County, Florida
- Nearest city: Tallahassee
- Coordinates: 30°27′1″N 84°16′55″W
- Architectural style: Greek Revival
- Website: Official website
- NRHP reference No.: 72000335 (original); 100003925 (increase)

Significant dates
- Added to NRHP: June 13, 1972
- Boundary increase: April 25, 2019

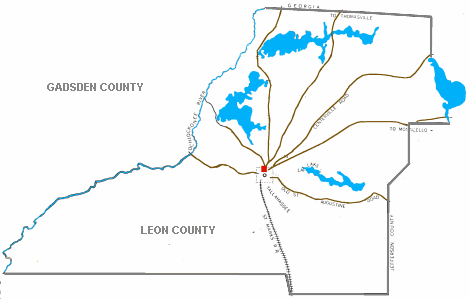
General location of The Grove Plantation

The Grove, known officially as the Call/Collins House at The Grove, is an antebellum plantation house located in Tallahassee, Leon County, Florida. Territorial Governor Richard Keith Call constructed The Grove circa 1840. By 1851, Call deeded the property to his daughter, Ellen Call Long, who owned it until 1903. Long's granddaughter, Reinette Long Hunt, acquired the property and owned it until her death in 1940. Hunt opened The Grove Hotel during this era and developed onsite cottages that served as rental properties. After a brief period under the ownership of John W. Ford and Josephine Agler, future Florida governor LeRoy Collins and his wife, Mary Call Darby Collins, a great-granddaughter of Richard Keith Call, bought The Grove.

Mary Call Darby Collins was the last of Call's descendants to own The Grove. During LeRoy Collins' tenure as governor, The Grove served as the unofficial executive residence while the current Florida Governor's Mansion was under construction, from 1955 to 1957. The Collins family owned The Grove until 1985, when the state of Florida acquired the property for the purpose of creating a state historic house museum. The Collins family received life leases and lived there until their deaths. Following the death of Mrs. Collins in 2009, the property formally reverted to the state. The property includes a small active family cemetery that predates the current Grove residence and serves as the final resting place for several generations of the Call and Collins families.

It is now a museum.

== Family ==
=== Richard Keith Call ===
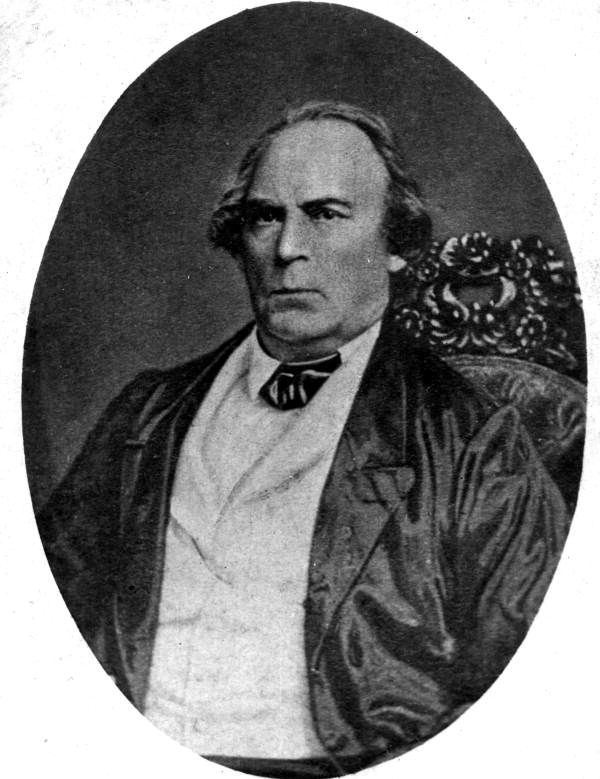
Richard Keith Call, circa 1840s

The 10-acre parcel on which The Grove is situated was once part of a much larger 640 acres (2.6 km^{2}) tract purchased by Richard Keith Call in 1825. Call came to Tallahassee after his single term as territorial delegate to the United States House of Representatives. He was a member of future president Andrew Jackson's inner circle and used his connections to secure a position with the federal land office in Tallahassee. The first residence on the property, described as "a plain building of several rooms on one floor, with outside chimneys and porches," was built around the time Call acquired the property in 1825. According to oral tradition, Mary Kirkman Call, Richard Keith Call's wife, was responsible for the naming of The Grove. In an early letter written by Mrs. Call to Jackson's wife, Rachel, the letter is datelined from "Hickory Grove."

In 1836, President Andrew Jackson appointed Richard Keith Call as Territorial Governor of Florida. The overriding concern of the territory at this time was the Second Seminole War, in which Call played a central role. As Brigadier General of the Florida Militia prior to his governorship, Call led the state militia into the ill-fated Battle of Withlacoochee, which took place on December 31, 1835. Upon his return to Tallahassee, Call sought to regroup his forces and was prepared to set sail with them for Tampa Bay when the death of his wife forced him to remain behind and attend to family matters, including handling the arrangements for his newborn daughter, Mary Call Brevard. It was during this time that he received his appointment to the governorship, and immediately immersed himself into the administration of the territory. The Grove likely served as an important planning center during the war, as Call, who advocated for a more aggressive military strategy, often sent the Florida militia off to conduct their own campaigns. The Grove also served as the headquarters for a contingent of the US 6th Infantry during the war.

The exact date of The Grove's construction is not known. The earliest known reference to the home's construction comes from Thomas Hagner, who wrote in November 1838: "I was at Governor Call's yesterday, he has not returned. Col. Green of the infantry makes his house headquarters, and Mr. Walker, a fine gentleman of the bar – a relative of the governor, also lives there. The house is about ½ mile from Tallahassee. The Governor is building a very fine brick house there just in front of his present residence, which they say will be the finest house in the Territory." The Grove was finished by the end of 1839. The "Col. Green" referenced in this letter was likely Lt. Col. John Green, an officer in the 6th US Infantry who later died in 1840, and was originally buried in the Call Family Cemetery before being reinterred at St. Augustine National Cemetery.

Built during the Second Seminole War, security concerns were a major aspect of The Grove's construction. The thick exterior and interior walls and the columns are all made from brick, likely manufactured onsite, giving the building a fortress-like appearance. Having access to clean water was also important during this time, and at least one cistern, recently restored, was built for this purpose. The construction of The Grove also coincided with the completion of the Tallahassee Railroad, first to St. Marks in 1837 then to Port Leon in 1839. Elements of the building were most certainly imported at this time, including the wood flooring, marble fireplaces, and sandstone window sills. These items likely arrived to Tallahassee through the newly completed railroad from either St. Marks or Port Leon.

The Grove was built by enslaved craftsmen of African descent, many of whom were likely hired from other slave owners and had perhaps also worked to build Call's railroad. The level of their craftsmanship can be seen in the building itself, which still stands after over 175 years. While Call owned a number of slaves at this time and later became a cotton planter, there is little evidence to suggest The Grove itself ever served as a major agricultural plantation. Call was primarily involved with land speculation, his legal practice, the railroad, and politics. During the financial fallout from the Port Leon disaster in the early 1840s, of which Richard Keith Call was a major investor, The Grove was among the assets listed as collateral in settlements reached with his various creditors. The Port Leon debacle, coupled with the Tallahassee fire of 1843 (which started in a building co-owned by Call and destroyed his law office), and the failure of the Union Bank led to significant financial difficulties and a series of lawsuits against Call that lasted into the 1850s. In the ensuing settlements, Call lost some of his land holdings, but was able to keep The Grove, the Tallahassee Railroad Company, and the Orchard Pond Plantation near Lake Jackson.

In 1845, after a failed run for governor of Florida, Call retired from active politics. Afterwards, he devoted himself more to the life of a gentleman planter and took up residence at Orchard Pond plantation. By the late 1840s, his daughter, Ellen, married a promising lawyer and future state legislator, Medicus A. Long, and started a family of her own. Call eventually deeded her The Grove along with seven slaves in 1851. He spent the rest of his life at Orchard Pond, but was a frequent visitor of The Grove. In one of the notable events of The Grove's history, Call, who was an ardent Southern Unionist, came to Tallahassee to protest the state's secession convention taking place at the Capitol in January 1861. He decided at the last minute not to go, however, and stayed instead at The Grove. It was here that a group of secessionists decided to accost him after they voted to secede. Call stood out on the front porch, and raising his cane above his head, told them "You have opened the gates of hell, from which shall flow the curses of the damned which shall sink you to perdition." He returned to The Grove permanently as his health deteriorated, and died in 1862.

=== Ellen Call Long ===
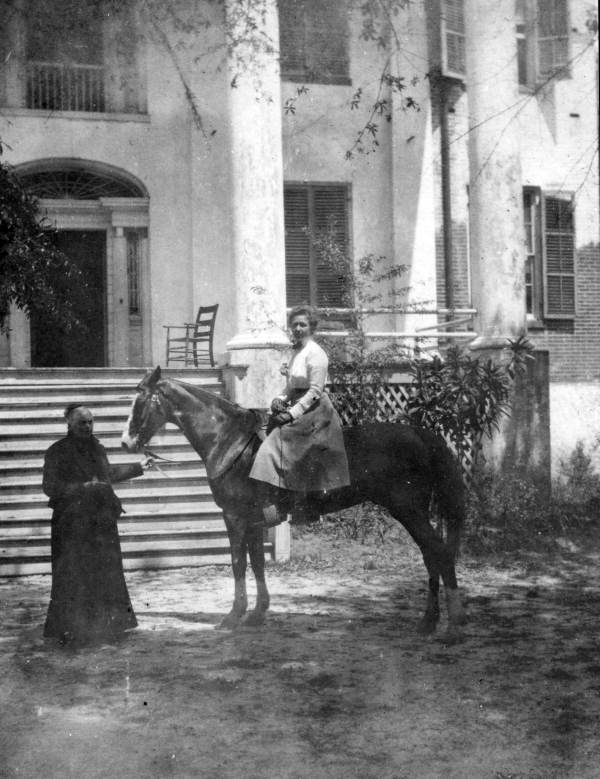
Ellen Call Long and Unknown Woman in Front of Grove, ca. 1880

After Ellen Call Long acquired the property, The Grove remained an important social gathering place for the political and economic elite of Tallahassee. In addition to a thriving legal practice, her husband, Medicus A. Long, became prominent in state politics and served in the state legislature as a senator. Like her father, Ellen was an ardent Unionist, a fact which strained relations between her and her husband, who was an outspoken secessionist. Her husband eventually left for Texas in the late 1850s, and they spent the rest of their lives separated although they never divorced. They had eight children, of whom only two lived to adulthood.

During the Civil War, although she opposed secession, Ellen enlisted in the cause of the Confederacy. Her son, Richard Call Long, Sr., served in the 2nd Florida Cavalry and she opened The Grove to Confederate officers and to wounded veterans. She was one of the members of the Ladies Soldier's Friend Sewing Society, a group of prominent society women in Tallahassee who volunteered their services to provide Confederate soldiers with clothing articles during the war. Ellen opened The Grove for a number of social events during the Civil War, including the Tallahassee May Day festivities held on the grounds on May 1, 1865, less than a week after the city received the news of General Robert E. Lee's surrender. The Second Florida cavalry band provided music for the event, which was likely the last performance of the group as the Union army, under General Edward McCook, arrived in the city on May 10, 1865.

After the war, Ellen Call Long took more to traveling and promoting Florida's interests at home and abroad. As a way of supporting herself and her family, she started silkworm cultivation on The Grove property, at first using the first floor of the main house before building a separate cottage for this purpose. She was a leading member of the Women's Silk Culture Association and published a well-received treatise on silk cultivation and emerged as a leading expert on the subject in the state of Florida. During the 1885 gubernatorial inauguration of Edward A. Perry, a large American flag made from silk grown at The Grove was presented. As the growth of mulberry trees were crucial for silk manufacturing, Ellen also became involved in forestry. She was one of the first people in Florida to advocate for controlled burning as a form of forest management.

By the late 1800s, the cost of living and reduced income started to catch up with Ellen Call Long. She also supported her son's and her daughter's families. As a result, she started selling off parcels of land around The Grove. Much of the land north and west of the property was turned into a subdivision known as the Long Grove Addition. The continued hardships faced by Ellen resulted in foreclosure proceedings being brought against her in 1903, and in desperation she turned to her grandson-in-law, Charles E. Hunt. Under disputed circumstances, she signed over The Grove and Orchard Pond to him. Her attempts to sue for repossession of the properties failed, and the properties eventually went to her granddaughter, Reinette Long Hunt, the wife of Charles Hunt. Ellen died in 1905 and is buried in the family cemetery.

=== LeRoy and Mary Call Darby Collins ===
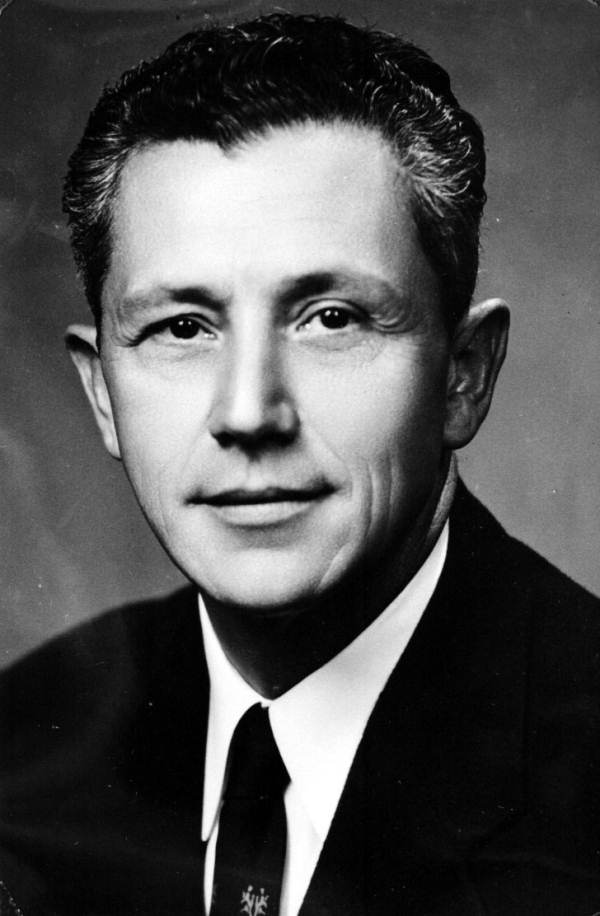
Governor LeRoy Collins

When LeRoy Collins and his wife, Mary Call Darby Collins, acquired the property in 1941, it was in a tremendous state of disrepair. Mrs. Collins was a great granddaughter of Richard Keith Call, and her family connections to The Grove played a pivotal role in the Fords deciding to sell them the property for less than market value. At this time, Collins was a promising young lawyer and politician who was a member of the Florida State Legislature. Their restoration work came to a halt in the early 1940s, as Collins stepped down from his legislative seat to enlist in the Navy during World War II, rising to the rank of Lt. J.G. Although the Collins family left during that time, The Grove was far from abandoned. Evidence from the war years suggests that servicemen drawn into Tallahassee by Dale Mabry Field congregated at The Grove. In subsequent renovations of the historic cistern, the dog tags of a Lt. Joseph Azat, a pilot who died during World War II, were recovered and later returned to his family.

After World War II, Collins resumed his Tallahassee law practice and his service in the legislature. He emerged as a leading state senator at this time. The Collins family made a number of alterations to their home in the late 1940s. They added a sunroom onto the back of the house, which became known as the Florida Room. They also removed a number of Grove Hotel era features, such as bathrooms added to the first floor parlor. As the brick surface of Monroe Street was being replaced with asphalt, the Collins family acquired a large number of the thick pavers and created brick patios along the outside of the house. They also added closets upstairs and poured a cement slab in the basement.

In 1954, Collins decided to run for governor. Following the death of Governor Daniel McCarty in 1953, the governorship passed to Senate President Charley Johns on an interim basis. Johns decided to run for election as governor as well, but Collins managed to defeat him in the ensuing Democratic Party primary. Shortly after he assumed office in 1955, the state decided to construct the new Governor's Mansion on the site of the previous one. It was at this time that The Grove functioned as the de facto Governor's Mansion, a role it fulfilled until the completion of the new building in 1957. Collins was the first governor to live in the new mansion. Mary Call Darby Collins was actively involved in selecting the furnishings of the new mansion. James Cogar, who worked at Colonial Williamsburg, worked with Mrs. Collins on the mansion furnishing plan and after they finished, she hired Cogar to help open The Grove as a public museum. When the Collins family took possession of The Grove in the early 1940s, most of its original furnishings were gone, sold by either Ellen Call Long or Reinette Long Hunt to help make ends meet. It was largely through the efforts of Cogar that the Collins family acquired most of the period pieces used to furnish the house.

Collins established himself as one of the most popular governors in Florida's history, a fact vindicated by his reelection in 1956, making him the first sitting governor ever to win a gubernatorial election in the state. He was named chairman of both the Southern Governors' Conference and the National Governors' Conference. During his governorship, Collins became embroiled in the debate over integration sparked by the US Supreme Court's landmark decision in Brown v. Board of Education. Like many southern states, the Florida State Legislature moved to issue a resolution of interposition in opposition to the court's ruling. Collins resolutely decried this stance, which he considered tantamount to treason, and took a firm stand against the legislature. Collins' role as a southern moderate attracted the attention of national Democratic Party leaders. He was selected as Honorary Chairman of the 1960 Democratic National Convention in Los Angeles and later took positions in the Lyndon B. Johnson administration as Under Secretary of Commerce and head of the newly created Community Relations Service (CRS). As director of the CRS, Collins served as the intermediary between the Southern Christian Leadership Conference, the State of Alabama, and the United States government during the tense Civil Rights marches in Selma, Alabama, in 1965. Photographs showing his involvement with Selma circulated back in Florida shortly afterwards and effectively killed his political career after he tried unsuccessfully to run for Senate in 1968.

After LeRoy Collins' political career ended, the Collins family came back to The Grove, where LeRoy resumed private law practice. There remained a question as to what should be done about the residence. Governor and Mrs. Collins were averse to selling the property outside of the family and as early as the 1970s, the state expressed interest in purchasing the house.

== Grove Hotel ==
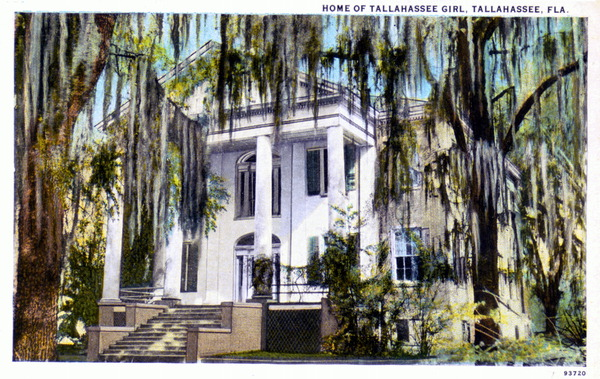
The Grove Hotel Postcard, ca. 1920s

Reinette Long Hunt owned The Grove from 1903 until her death in 1940. She and her husband, Charles Hunt, were divorced in 1911. Like her grandmother before her, Reinette faced the difficulties of maintaining The Grove as a single woman in an era when men dominated the business, political, and the legal systems of society. Reinette presided over a salon-like atmosphere at The Grove. She opened her home as an artist studio, from which she sold artwork and taught art classes. She was also the last member of the family to own Orchard Pond plantation, which she rented out to Tennent Ronalds, a wealthy Scotsman who owned the adjacent Live Oak Plantation. Ronalds used the plantation for quail hunting. By 1916, Ronalds bought Orchard Pond from Reinette, ending over 70 years of direct association between members of the Call family and the property. Reinette developed friendships with many of the elite northerners who moved to Tallahassee at this time, including Frances C. Griscom, a champion amateur golfer. This friendship inspired Reinette to open The Grove to the newly formed Tallahassee Country Club. The Grove served as its first clubhouse and the adjacent grounds included a few golf holes. In the late 1910s, Reinette Long Hunt entered into a partnership with John Aldridge to form the Leon Storage and Seed Company, a short-lived company.

By the 1920s, Reinette started The Grove Hotel. She marketed The Grove as "The Home of the Tallahassee Girl" after the Maurice Thompson novel of the same name, of which Eleanora Long Hollinger, the daughter of Ellen Call Long, was widely believed to be the inspiration for the protagonist of the story. The Grove Hotel's location near the Governor's Mansion made it ideal for visiting politicians and lawyers. Among the renters were Richard Ervin, a future chief justice of the Florida Supreme Court. He rented out the entire second floor during the 1920s. In 1924, the Tallahassee Centennial celebrations were held at The Grove. A grandstand was constructed and people watched as separate plays were held for white and black audiences on different days, at least one of which was written by Reinette herself. In an effort to generate additional income, Reinette also constructed three small cottages on the property and repurposed the old silkworm cottage into a residential building.

On New Year's Day, 1934, The Grove caught fire. The fire was largely relegated to the attic and roof, but caused significant damage. Richard Call Long Jr., Reinette's brother, died from injuries sustained while fighting the fire. Perhaps as a way of protecting the cemetery in the wake of her financial troubles, Reinette deeded it to the local Masonic Lodge, Jackson Lodge Number One, before her death. Despite her best efforts, Reinette could not stave off creditors, and was on the verge of subdividing the rest of the property surrounding The Grove when she died in 1940. The property passed to John W. Ford and Josephine Ford Agler, her distant cousins and the grandchildren of Ohio industrialist Joseph Green Butler. After a brief period under their ownership, the property passed to LeRoy Collins and his wife Mary Call Darby Collins.

== Ownership by the State of Florida ==
In 1985, the State of Florida formally acquired The Grove from the Collins family for the purpose of opening a historic house museum. LeRoy Collins and Mary Call Darby Collins were given life leases on the property. LeRoy Collins died in 1991 and Mary Call Darby Collins died in 2009. After the death of Mrs. Collins, the state started a complete rehabilitation of the property. The Florida Department of State, Division of Historical Resources began the process of preparing the building for future use as a public museum. The building underwent extensive rehabilitation, which included structural stabilization, repair of historic windows, masonry, and interior finishes, the restoration of the historic cistern, mechanical upgrades, new plumbing, and the installation of life safety features. To make the building handicapped accessible, the state built a ramp leading into the 1950s addition and constructed an elevator. The restoration of the building was guided by the Leadership in Energy and Environmental Design (LEED) Green Building Rating System. As part of this, a non-historic carport built by the Collins family on the property was repurposed into a public bathroom and a pump was installed into the cistern to allow for it to collect rainwater from the building and provide irrigation for the lawn, minimizing the site's impact on the city water supply. Efforts were also made to reuse as much of the original building materials as possible and items that could not be reused, such as sinks, toilets, and appliances, were donated to Habitat for Humanity.

== Architecture ==
The Grove is an excellent example of antebellum Greek Revival architecture. Among the distinguishing architectural features of the house is a full-height pedimented portico supported by four Tuscan columns, a prominent dentilated cornice extending around the building along the roofline, elaborate doors on both the first and second story, and a symmetrical, balanced interior floorplan, all of which are hallmarks of the Greek Revival style. The original main entrance of the house features double wooden doors flanked by unfinished paired fluted pilasters and columns, and elaborate sidelights. The original main entryway is also topped by an elaborate elliptical fanlight and a plain entablature similar in appearance to that extending near the portico roofline. The second story entryway has a similar appearance to the first story entry except the fanlight is plainer in design and a small balconet has been placed in front. This doorway was supposed to open up into a second story balcony but according to legend, the ship carrying the materials for the balcony was lost at sea and no attempt was made to finish the project.

The building's exterior and interior walls are entirely made of brick, including the columns. With the exception of the brick along the portico, which is covered with stucco, the rest of the exterior brick is exposed. The windows are almost all original, and are mostly 6/6 single hung sash windows. The house is topped by a low-pitched hip roof with architectural slate shingles and four symmetrically placed brick chimneys.

The interior layout of The Grove's historic core has been described as Georgian in design, with a central hallway on the first and second floors flanked by two rooms identical in size. Perhaps the most notable feature of the interior is a spiral staircase from the first to the second floor hallway similar in styling to that of the interior staircase of The Hermitage in Nashville, Tennessee. Other prominent design elements in the interior of the building including decorative pedimented pilaster moldings around the windows and Egyptian marble fireplaces in the first floor parlor and dining room. The first floor window surrounds/casings are canted, with decorative wood paneling covering the brick walls underneath. The doorways going into the first floor rooms from the central hallway also have pedimented pilasters. The rest of the interior spaces are less ornate. There are fireplaces in all of the rooms in the house.

== Gallery ==
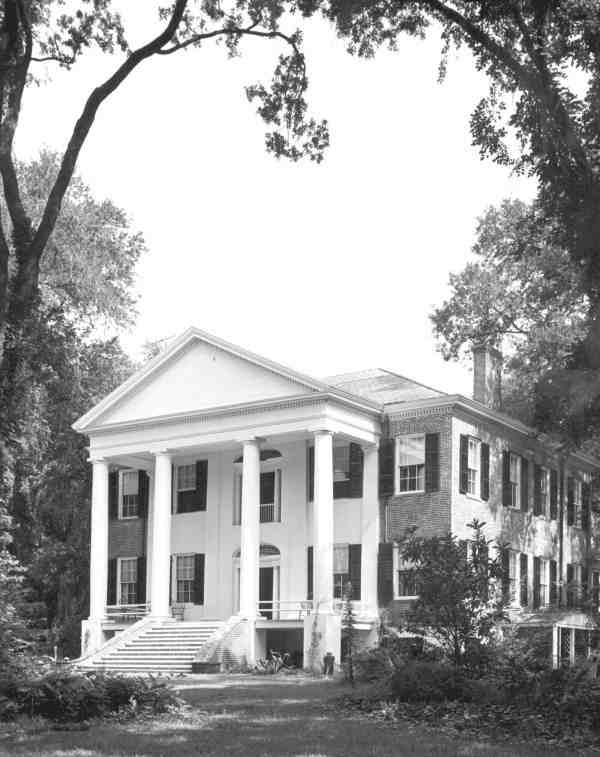
Call-Collins Mansion

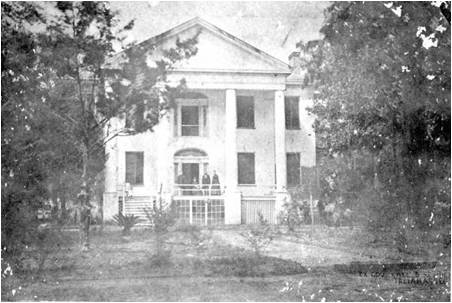
Call-Collins Mansion, 1880

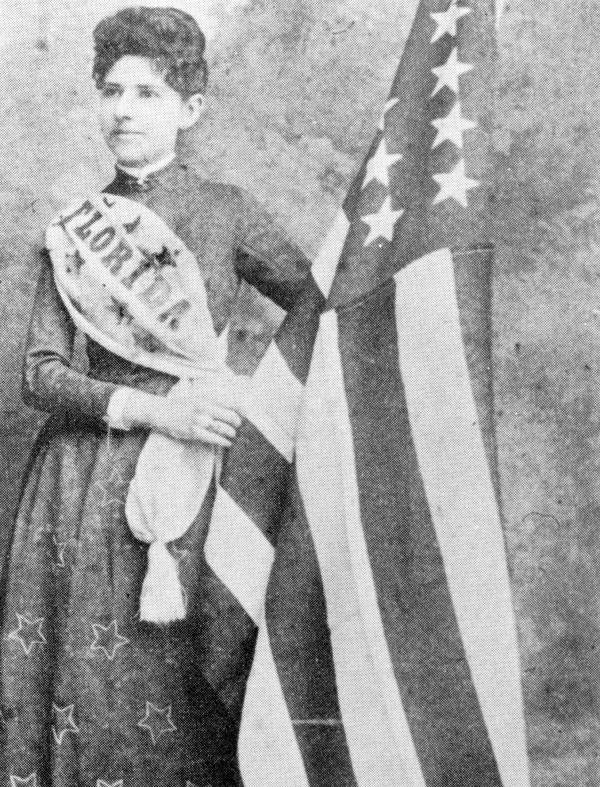
Mena E. Williams Hirshberg holding a US flag made from silk grown at The Grove, 1885

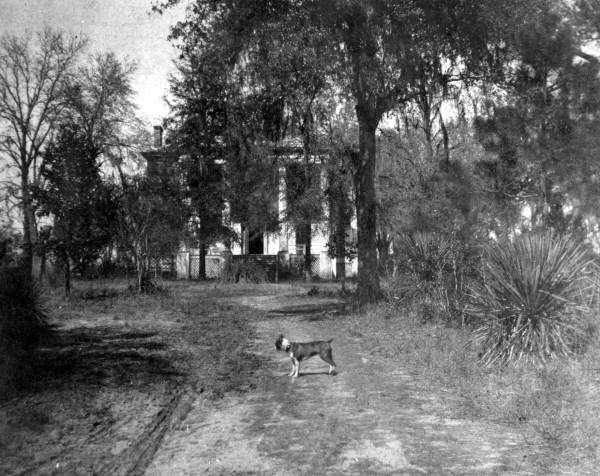
Dog standing in front of The Grove, circa 1905

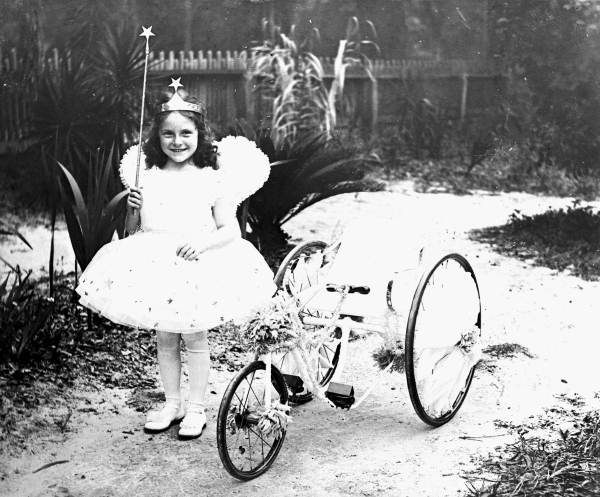
Mary Call Darby at The Grove as the Fairy Queen, 1916

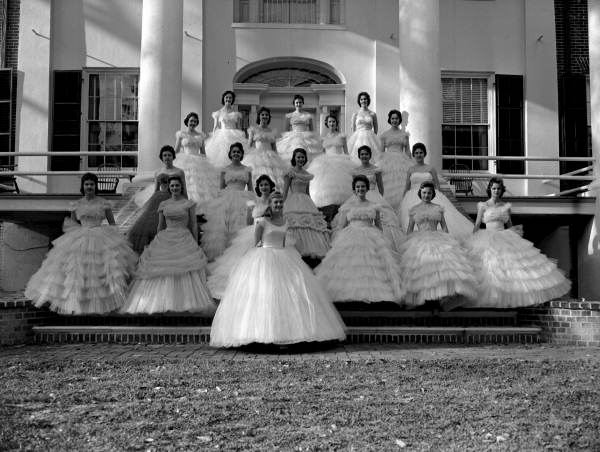
May Day Party at The Grove, 1960

== Sources ==
- Collins, Thomas LeRoy. Forerunners Courageous: Stories of Frontier Florida (1971)
- Divoll, Leslie. Florida Department of State, Division of Historical Resources, "The Grove Tallahassee", Florida Historic Structure Report, Part I. Tallahassee, FL, 1992
- Doherty, Herbert J. and Richard Keith Call: Southern Unionist. Gainesville, FL: University of Florida Press, 1961*Menton, Jane Aurell. The Grove: A Florida Home Through Seven Generations. Tallahassee: Sentry Press, 1998.
- Menton, Jane Aurell. The Grove: A Florida Home Through Seven Generations. Tallahassee, FL: Sentry Press, 1998,
- Paisley, Clifton; From Cotton To Quail, University of Florida Press, c1968.
- Florida Division of Historical Resources "A Brief History of the Grove"
- Florida Senate statutes
- Tallahassee Democrat, August 1, 2006

== Further reading on Richard Keith Call ==
- Edward E. Baptist, Creating an Old South: Middle Florida's Plantation Frontier before the Civil War (Chapel Hill: University of North Carolina Press, 2002);
- Caroline Mays Brevard, "Richard Keith Call," Florida Historical Quarterly, I, October 1908: 8-20;
- Kate Denison, "Richard Keith Call: Promoter of the Florida Wilderness," (Florida Living, November 1992: 37);
- Herbert J. Doherty, Richard Keith Call, Southern Unionist (Gainesville: University of Florida Press 1961); Sidney Walter Martin, "Richard Keith Call: Florida Territorial Leader" (Florida Historical Quarterly, XXI, January 1943: 331-351). For a general overview of political context of Call's governorship, see Arthur W. Thompson's Jacksonian Democracy on the Florida Frontier (Gainesville: University of Florida Press, 1961).

== Further reading on LeRoy Collins ==
- Sandy D'Alemberte and Frank Sanchez, "Tribute to a Great Man: LeRoy Collins in Florida State" University Law Review 19 (Fall 1991: 255-64);
- Tom R. Wagy, Governor LeRoy Collins of Florida (Tuscaloosa: University of Alabama Press, 1985)
- Martin Dyckman's Floridian of His Century: The Courage of LeRoy Collins (Gainesville: University of Florida Press, 2006)
- LeRoy Collins Papers at Florida State University (http://www.fsu.edu/~speccoll/leroy/lerocoll.htm) and Collins correspondence at the State of Florida Archives in Tallahassee (http://dlis.dos.state.fl.us/barm/rediscovery/default.asp)
