= 1868 Missouri lieutenant gubernatorial election =

- November 3, 1868
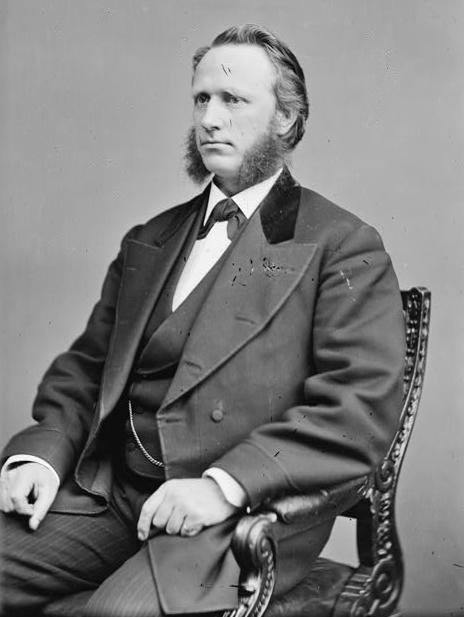

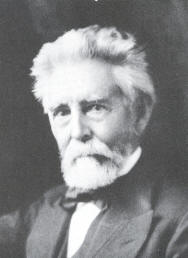
Nominee	Edwin O. Stanard	Norman Jay Colman
Party	Republican	Democratic
Popular vote	Unknown	Unknown
Percentage	Unknown	Unknown
Lieutenant Governor before election
George Smith
Republican
Elected Lieutenant Governor
Edwin O. Stanard
Republican

The 1868 Missouri lieutenant gubernatorial election was held on November 3, 1868, in order to elect the lieutenant governor of Missouri. Republican nominee Edwin O. Stanard defeated Democratic nominee and former member of the Missouri House of Representatives Norman Jay Colman. The exact results of this election are unknown.

== General election ==
On election day, November 3, 1868, Republican nominee Edwin O. Stanard won the election against his opponent Democratic nominee Norman Jay Colman, thereby retaining Republican control over the office of lieutenant governor. Stanard was sworn in as the 14th lieutenant governor of Missouri on January 12, 1869.

=== Results ===
Missouri lieutenant gubernatorial election, 1868
Party	Candidate	Votes	%
Republican	Edwin O. Stanard	Unknown	Unknown
Democratic	Norman Jay Colman	Unknown	Unknown
Total votes		Unknown	100.00
Republican hold			

== See also ==
- 1868 Missouri gubernatorial election
