= 1868 Luxembourg general election =

Partial general elections were held in Luxembourg on 17 December 1868, electing members of the Chamber of Deputies. The elections took place in Capellen, Clervaux, Diekirch, Echternach, Luxembourg-Campagne, Mersch, Redange, Remich.

== Background ==
The law of 30 November 1868 and the Grand-Ducal decree of 2 December 1868 increased the number of Deputies from the constituencies of Capellen, Clervaux, Diekirch, Echternach, Luxembourg-Campagne, Mersch, Redange, and Remich. As a result, the 1868 elections were organised to elect 2 Deputies in Luxembourg-Campagne and 1 Deputy in each of the other cantons mentioned.

== Results ==
Candidates who were successful are in bold.

Canton	Seats	Candidate	Votes
Capellen	1	**Risch**	202
Capellen	1	Schumacher	75
Capellen	1	**Turnout**	277
Clervaux	1	**Conzemius**	
Clervaux	1	**Turnout**	
Diekirch	1	**De Blochausen**	245
Diekirch	1	Salentiny	154
Diekirch	1	**Turnout**	400
Echternach	1	**Bernard Servais**	91
Echternach	1	J.-P. Even	2
Echternach	1	**Turnout**	94
Luxembourg-Campagne	2	**E. Simons**	255
Luxembourg-Campagne	2	**Paul de Scherff**	245
Luxembourg-Campagne	2	**Turnout**	265
Mersch	1	**Joseph Servais**	
Mersch	1	**Turnout**	
Redange	1	**Léopold Bian**	235
Redange	1	Fautsch	51
Redange	1	Berger	39
Redange	1	**Turnout**	325
Remich	1	**Gretsch**	133
Remich	1	**Turnout**	136
