= 1868 Kansas gubernatorial election =

- November 3, 1868
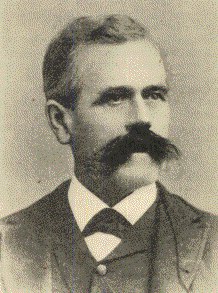

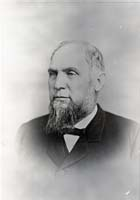
Nominee	James M. Harvey	George Washington Glick
Party	Republican	Democratic
Popular vote	29,795	13,881
Percentage	68.22%	31.78%
- County results Harvey: 50–60% 60–70% 70–80% 80–90% >90% Glick: 50–60% 70–80% No Data/Vote
Governor before election
Samuel J. Crawford
Republican
Elected Governor
James M. Harvey
Republican

The 1868 Kansas gubernatorial election was held on November 3, 1868, in order to elect the Governor of Kansas. Republican nominee and incumbent member of the Kansas Senate James M. Harvey defeated Democratic nominee and incumbent member of the Kansas State Legislature George Washington Glick.

== General election ==
On election day, November 3, 1868, Republican nominee James M. Harvey won the election by a margin of 15,914 votes against his opponent Democratic nominee George Washington Glick, thereby retaining Republican control over the office of Governor. Harvey was sworn in as the 5th Governor of Kansas on January 11, 1869.

=== Results ===
Kansas gubernatorial election, 1868
Party	Candidate	Votes	%
Republican	James M. Harvey	29,795	68.22
Democratic	George Washington Glick	13,881	31.78
Total votes		43,676	100.00
Republican hold			
