= 1868 Peruvian general election =

- 1868
- Presidential election
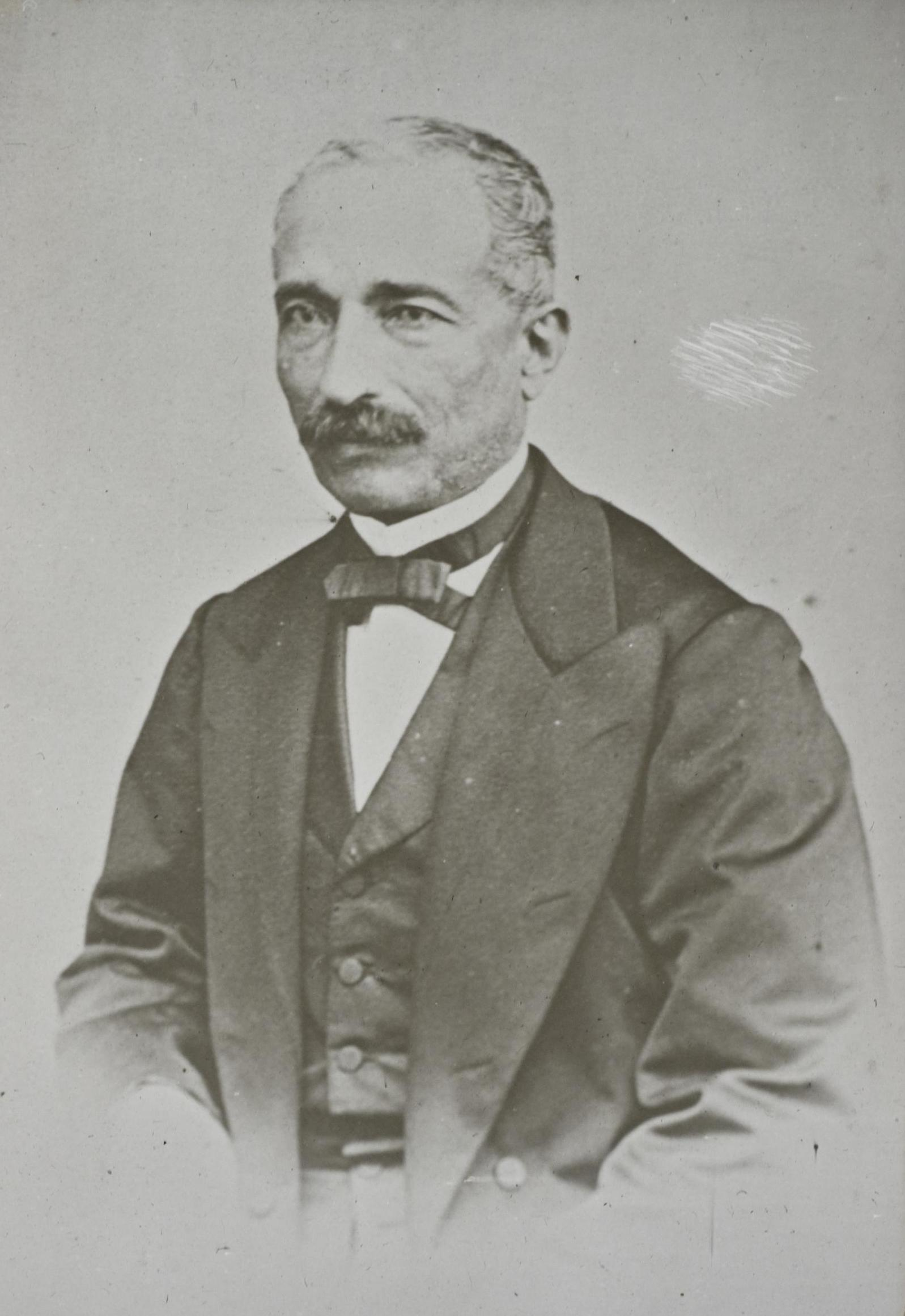

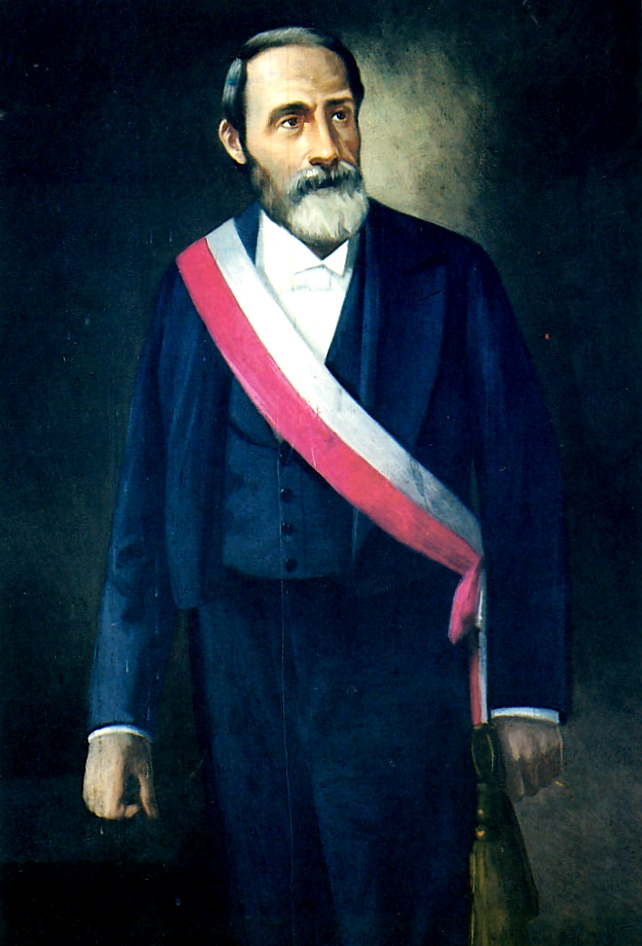
Candidate	José Balta	Manuel Costas Arce
Electoral vote	3,168	384
Percentage	81.99%	9.94%
President before election
Pedro Diez Canseco
Elected President
José Balta

General elections were held in Peru in 1868. The presidential election resulted in a victory for José Balta, who received 82% of the vote in the electoral college.

== Results ==
=== President ===
Candidate	Votes	%
José Balta	3,168	81.99
Manuel Costas Arce	384	9.94
Manuel Toribio Ureta	153	3.96
Other candidates	159	4.11
Total	3,864	100.00
Registered voters/turnout	4,454	–
Source: Lúcar, Congress
