= Wilkinson Call =

American politician (1934–1910)

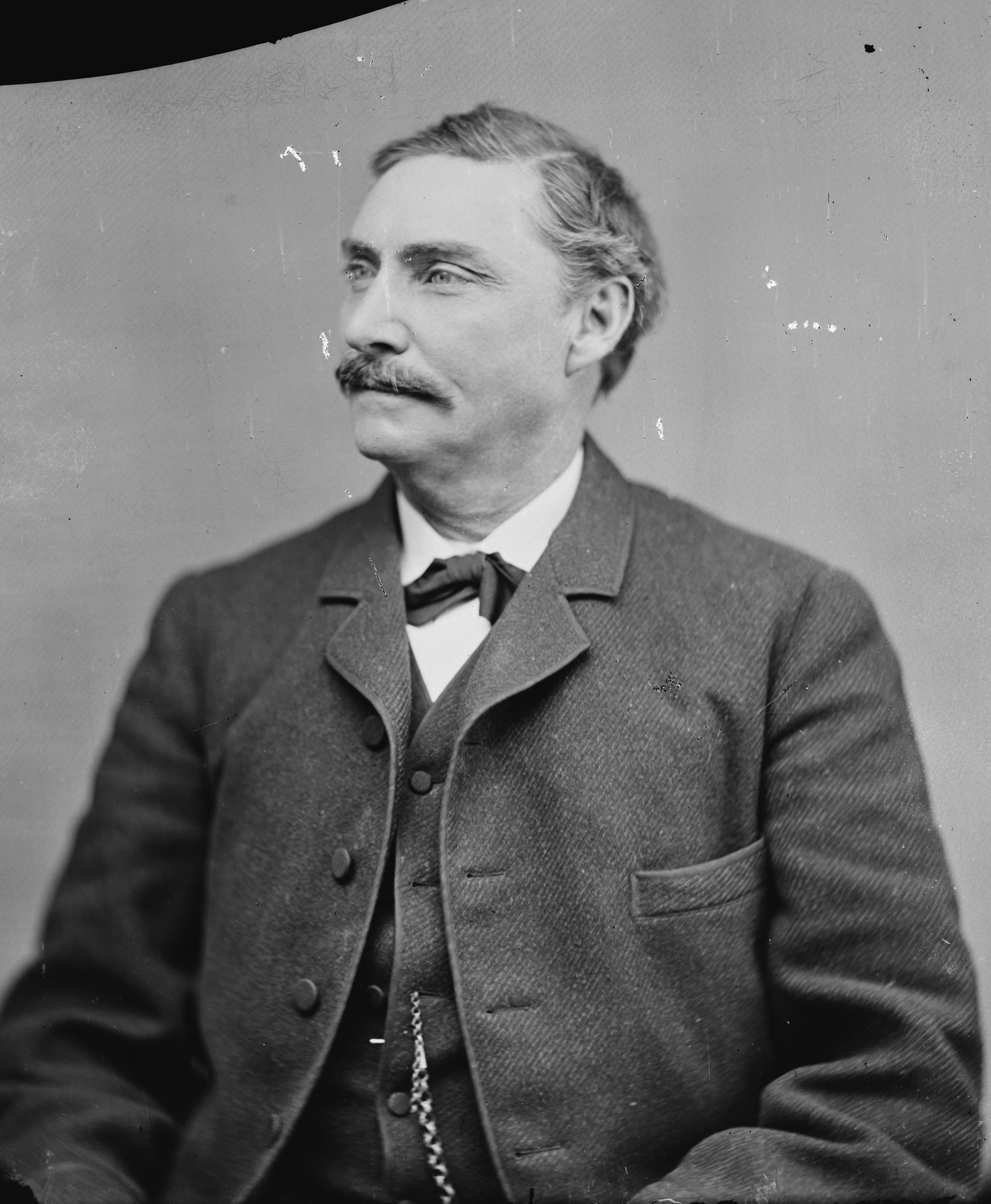
- Call (c. 1870–1880)

United States Senator from Florida
- In office March 4, 1879 – March 3, 1897
- Preceded by: Simon B. Conover
- Succeeded by: Stephen Mallory II

Personal details
- Born: January 9, 1834 Russellville, Kentucky, U.S.
- Died: August 24, 1910 (aged 76) Washington, D.C., U.S.
- Party: Democratic

Wilkinson Call (January 9, 1834 – August 24, 1910) was an American lawyer and politician who represented Florida in the United States Senate from 1879 to 1897.

== Biography ==
Wilkinson Call, nephew of Territorial Governor of Florida Richard K. Call and cousin of Florida governor David S. Walker and U.S. Senator from Arkansas James D. Walker, was born on January 9, 1834, in Logan County, Kentucky. He was the son of Dr. George W. Call and Lucinda Lee. His mother was a member of Virginia's prominent Lee family. Kentucky senator John J. Crittenden was his uncle by marriage.

By the late 1830s, his parents had relocated to Tallahassee, Florida. Call subsequently moved to Jacksonville, Florida, where he studied law, was admitted to the bar, and entered practice. By the late 1840s, he had entered a law practice with his cousin David S. Walker in Tallahassee. Call served as adjutant general in the Confederate Army during the Civil War.

Call was elected to represent Florida in the United States Senate as a Democrat on December 29, 1865, but was not permitted to enter office by the Republican majority there, like many other Confederate leaders. He subsequently served as a member of the Democratic National Committee and again practiced law in Jacksonville.

He was elected again, as a Democrat, to the United States Senate on January 21, 1879. He was reelected to his seat on January 20, 1885, and May 26, 1891, and served from March 1879 to March 1897 (with a brief vacancy due to the legislature's failure to elect by March 1891). Along with Napoleon Bonaparte Broward, Call became a leader of the Democratic Party's populist agrarian faction, influenced by Florida's agrarian movement of the 1890s. Call actively supported and campaigned for William Jennings Bryan when the latter ran for President of the United States in the 1896 election. Florida Governor William D. Bloxham named John A. Henderson to serve until the state legislature selected a successor for Call. The U.S. Senate, believing Bloxham had overstepped gubernatorial authority, refused to allow Henderson to take office, leaving the matter to the Florida legislature. After several ballots and no decisive victor, Call withdrew and threw his support behind Stephen Mallory II, who won the seat. In the U.S. Senate, Call served as chairman of the Committee on Civil Service and Retrenchment during the 53rd Congress and also served on the Committee on Patents.

Upon retiring from the United States Senate, Call resided in Washington, D.C., until his death on August 24, 1910. He was interred in Oak Hill Cemetery. His daughter, Lucy Lee Call, was a noted opera singer who performed for the New York Metropolitan Opera. A nephew Rhydon M. Call was a long-serving federal court judge in Florida.

U.S. Senate
Preceded by Simon B. Conover	U.S. senator from Florida; 1879–1897	Succeeded by Stephen R. Mallory, Jr.
