= 1866 Rhode Island gubernatorial election =

- April 4, 1866
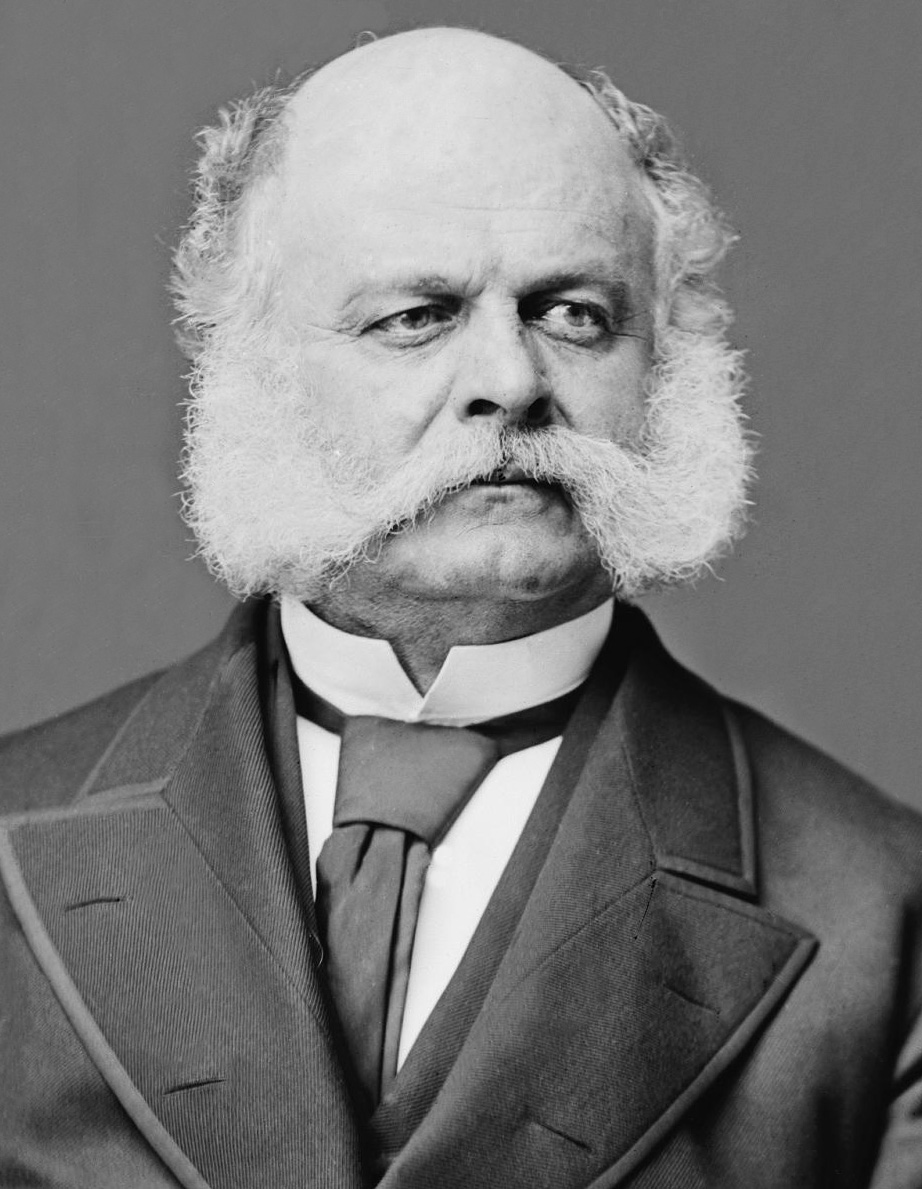

Nominee	Ambrose Burnside	Lyman Pierce
Party	Republican	Democratic
Popular vote	7,725	2,796
Percentage	73.24%	26.58%
- County results Burnside: 60–70% 70–80% 80–90%
Governor before election
James Y. Smith
Republican
Elected Governor
Ambrose Burnside
Republican

The 1866 Rhode Island gubernatorial election was held on April 4, 1866. Republican former Union Army Major General Ambrose Burnside defeated Democratic candidate Lyman Pierce.

Burnside, a War Democrat, won the Republican nomination with support from conservative Republicans who controlled the Republican state convention. The Republican campaign scrupulously avoided association with radical Republicans, whose contentious relationship with president Andrew Johnson split the national Republican–Union coalition.

== General election ==
1866 Rhode Island gubernatorial election
Party	Candidate	Votes	%
Republican	Ambrose Burnside	7,725	73.42
Democratic	Lyman Pierce	2,796	26.58
Total votes		10,521	100.00
Republican hold			

== Bibliography ==
- Dell, Christopher (1975). Lincoln and the War Democrats: The Grand Erosion of Conservative Tradition. Rutherford, NJ: Farleigh Dickenson University Press. ISBN 978-0-8386-1466-2.
- Dubin, Michael J. (2014). United States Gubernatorial Elections, 1861-1911: The Official Results by State and County. Jefferson, NC: McFarland and Company.
