= Richard K. Call =

Former territorial governor of Florida

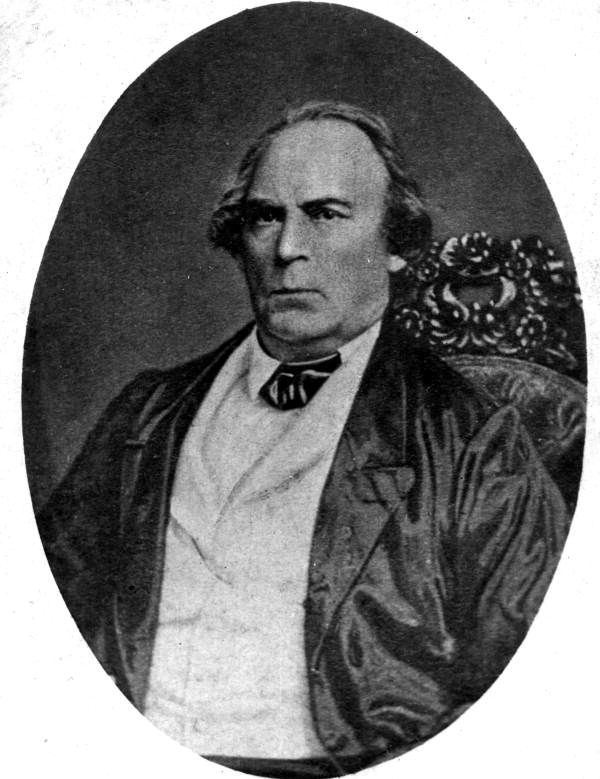

3rd & 6th Territorial Governor of Florida
- In office March 16, 1836 – December 2, 1839
- President: Andrew Jackson; Martin Van Buren
- Preceded by: John Eaton
- Succeeded by: Robert R. Reid
- In office March 19, 1841 – August 11, 1844
- President: William Henry Harrison; John Tyler
- Preceded by: Robert R. Reid
- Succeeded by: John Branch

Delegate to the U.S. House of Representatives from the Florida Territory
- In office March 4, 1823 – March 3, 1825
- Preceded by: Joseph M. Hernandez
- Succeeded by: Joseph M. White

Personal details
- Born: October 24, 1792 Pittsfield, Prince George County, Virginia, U.S.
- Died: September 14, 1862 (aged 69) The Grove Plantation, Tallahassee, Florida, U.S.
- Party: Whig
- Spouse: Mary Letitia Kirkman Call
- Children: Ellen Call Long; Mary Call Brevard
- Relatives: Wilkinson Call (nephew); David S. Walker (cousin)
- Occupation: lawyer, land speculator, railroad owner

Military service
- Allegiance: United States
- Branch/service: Florida Militia
- Rank: Brigadier General
- Battles/wars: Second Seminole War; Battle of Withlacoochee; Battle of Wahoo Swamp

Richard Keith Call (October 24, 1792 – September 14, 1862) was an American attorney and politician who served as the 3rd and 5th territorial governor of Florida. Before that, he was elected to the Florida Territorial Council and as a delegate to the U.S. Congress from Florida. In the mid-1830s, he developed two plantations in Leon County, Florida, one of which was several thousand acres in size. In 1860, Call held more than 120 people as slaves, the third-most in the county. Call was a Southern Unionist who opposed Florida's declared secession during the American Civil War.

== Early life and education ==
Richard Call was born to William and Helen Meade Walker Call and was the nephew of another Richard Call, a Revolutionary War hero. Call was born in Pittsfield, Prince George County, Virginia. When Call was young, his father, William, and two of his brothers died. Shortly after 1800, his widowed mother brought her four surviving children and five enslaved people across the Appalachian Mountains into Kentucky. She eventually settled on land owned by her brother Senator David Walker in Russellville, Kentucky, where Call spent most of his remaining childhood. Following the death of his mother in 1810, Call settled near another uncle in Tennessee to receive a formal education. In 1813, he left college to take part in the Creek War, which occurred during the period of the War of 1812 with Great Britain. Call was the uncle of Wilkinson Call, who became a U.S. Senator.

== War and politics ==
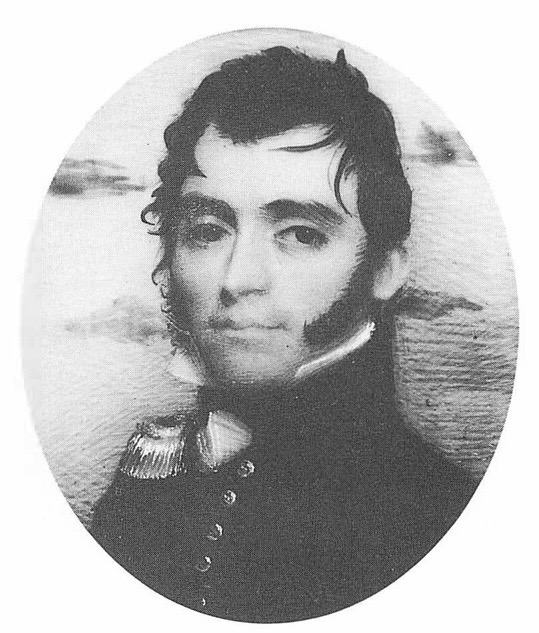
Richard Keith Call, miniature by unknown artist (Florida State Archives, Tallahassee via The Papers of Andrew Jackson, Volume 4)

Richard Call came favorably to the attention of General Andrew Jackson, a leader during the war. In 1814, Call was commissioned as a first lieutenant and went to serve as Jackson's aide in Spanish Florida. He was a witness to the signing of the 1818 Treaty of Tuscaloosa with the Chickasaw. He returned with General Jackson in 1821 to establish the territorial government after the United States acquired Florida from Spain by the Adams-Onís Treaty. After resigning from the Army in 1822, Call made Tallahassee, FL his home and opened a legal practice.

Call was a delegate to the 1856 Know Nothing convention in Philadelphia but walked out over the North vs. South split over slavery (demanding that Section 12 in support of the Kansas-Nebraska Act be restored).

== Marriage and family ==
In 1824, Call married Mary Letitia Kirkman of Nashville. Her parents were enemies of Jackson and opposed the marriage. The young couple was married at General Jackson's home, the Hermitage. Of their several children born, two daughters, Ellen Call Long and Mary Call Brevard, survived to adulthood.

== Florida ==
Call spent the rest of his life in Florida. A friend and ally of Andrew Jackson, he was appointed receiver in the land office, giving him insight into developing areas, and was considered one of the leaders of the "land-office faction," sometimes called the Nucleus, which was a force in territorial politics. He was elected to the Legislative Council of the territory and served as a Delegate to the U.S. Congress. In the 1830s, he bought and developed two plantations in Leon County. One had nearly 9,000 acres, and the other, The Grove Plantation, was a square mile in northern Tallahassee. Construction on the Grove probably began in 1824, at the time of Tallahassee's founding; the mansion was considered "one of the finest examples of Georgian-Colonial architecture in the South."

On March 16, 1836, he was appointed by President Andrew Jackson as the territory governor. During his first term as brigadier general of the Florida Militia, he led forces in fighting the Seminole Indians, most notably at the Battle of Wahoo Swamp in the Second Seminole War. President Martin Van Buren replaced him as governor with Robert R. Reid on December 2, 1839, following a dispute with Federal authorities over their assistance during the war.

In the 1840 presidential campaign, Call crossed party lines to assist Whig William Henry Harrison, who won and appointed him again as governor of Florida. During this second term, which began on March 19, 1841, Call moved the territory closer to statehood. He worked to minimize the financial problems that Florida suffered due to bank failures and a national business depression. He left office on August 11, 1844.

In 1845, Florida became a state, and Call sought election as governor. However, his role in supporting President Harrison's election caused him to lose.

== Planter and enslaver ==
During the 1830s, he had developed two plantations on land that he purchased in Leon County. Orchard Pond Plantation had more than 8,000 acres and was located north of Tallahassee. The Grove Plantation was located on Tallahassee's northern outskirts, where the Governor's Mansion was later constructed. By 1860, Call enslaved more than 100 people at Orchard Pond Plantation and was the third-largest slaveholder in the county. He died at The Grove on September 14, 1862.

The Grove Plantation was purchased in 1942 by future Florida governor LeRoy Collins and his wife Mary Call Darby Collins, a great-granddaughter of Richard Call. Collins later was elected for two terms as governor. Today, the Call-Collins Mansion at the Grove is on the National Register of Historic Places. The Collinses sold the house and property to the state for use as a historic house museum.

== Legacy ==
Several streets in Florida are named after Richard K. Call. Call Streets are in Tallahassee, Starke, Jacksonville, Hollywood, Orange City and High Springs.

The World War II Liberty ship SS Richard K. Call was named in his honor.

In 1828 it was proposed to establish Call County in north Florida, but the proposal was vetoed by William P. Duval.

Party political offices
| First | Whig nominee for Governor of Florida; 1845 | Succeeded by Thomas Brown |
U.S. House of Representatives
| Preceded by Joseph Marion Hernández | Delegate to the U.S. House of Representatives from Florida Territory's at-large congressional district 1823–1825 | Succeeded by Joseph M. White |
Political offices
| Preceded by John Eaton | Territorial Governor of Florida; 1836–1839 | Succeeded by Robert R. Reid |
| Preceded by Robert R. Reid | Territorial Governor of Florida; 1841–1844 | Succeeded by John Branch |
