= David S. Walker =

American judge and politician (1815–1891)

David Shelby Walker
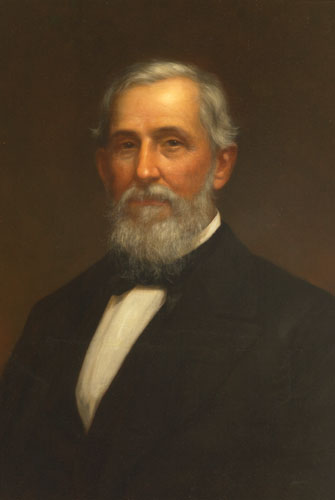

8th Governor of Florida
- In office December 20, 1865 – July 4, 1868
- Lieutenant: William W. J. Kelly
- Preceded by: William Marvin
- Succeeded by: Harrison Reed

Mayor of Tallahassee, Florida
- In office 1852
- Preceded by: D. P. Hogue
- Succeeded by: Richard Hayward

Member of the Florida House of Representatives
- In office 1848

Member of the Florida Senate
- In office 1845

Personal details
- Born: May 2, 1815 Logan County, Kentucky
- Died: July 20, 1891 (aged 76) Tallahassee, Florida
- Party: Whig (before 1856); Know Nothing (1856); Constitutional Unionist (1860-1861); Democratic (from 1861)
- Spouse(s): Philoclea Alston; Elizabeth Duncan
- Parent: David Walker

David Shelby Walker (May 2, 1815 – July 20, 1891) was the eighth governor of Florida, serving from 1865 to 1868. He served in the Florida House of Representatives and as mayor of Tallahassee. He also served as a judge. He was a Whig before shifting parties.

== Early life and career ==
Walker was born near Russellville in Logan County, Kentucky. He attended private schools in Kentucky and Tennessee and studied law. He moved to Florida in 1837, settling in Leon County. His father was David Walker, a prominent early Kentucky politician who served in the U.S. House of Representatives. David S. Walker was a cousin and close business and political confidante of Florida territorial governor Richard K. Call. He was also related to Florida Senator Wilkinson Call, who was Walker's law partner for several years in the 1850s and 1860s in Tallahassee.

Walker entered politics as a Whig and was elected to the first session of the Florida State Legislature in 1845, serving Wakulla and Leon counties as a senator. In 1848, he was elected by Leon County to the Florida House of Representatives. In 1849, he was appointed Registrar of Public Lands and was ex officio State Superintendent of Public Instruction, positions he held until 1854. He advocated and promoted interest in public schools. His efforts resulted in creating public schools in Tallahassee. He served as mayor of Tallahassee. He was the Know Nothing gubernatorial candidate in 1856 but lost to Democrat Madison S. Perry by 2.6 points. In 1859, he became a Florida Supreme Court Justice. Walker is also known for establishing Tallahassee's first library in the mid-1800s through his private funds in a time where money was not allocated to libraries outside of urban areas, especially in a "rural" state.

== Governorship ==
Before the American Civil War, Walker was a Constitutional Unionist and so had opposed secession. However, when Florida declared secession from the United States in 1861, he supported his state. Following the war, on November 29, 1865, Walker was elected governor unopposed in an election in which newly freed slaves were not allowed to participate. He was inaugurated on December 20 and took office January 18, 1866.

During his governorship, Florida transitioned from the federal oversight and military occupation of Reconstruction to readmission into the Union. Walker was a conservative who attempted to minimize changes to the antebellum social, political, and economic system. He protested the election of the 1868 Constitutional Convention, which was convened to adopt a new government that the Republican U.S. Congress would approve. He ultimately supported the 1868 Constitution when it turned out to be less protective of blacks than initially anticipated.

He did not run for reelection in the 1868 election, the first in which African American men could vote.

He returned to practicing law after leaving the governor's office on July 4, 1868. In 1878, he was appointed circuit court judge, a position he held until his death on July 20, 1891.

== Legacy ==
Tallahassee's first public library is the David S. Walker Library.

== See also ==
- List of United States political appointments across party lines

== Sources ==
- Official Governor's portrait and biography from the State of Florida
- Morris, Allen and Joan Perry Morris, compilers. The Florida Handbook 2007–2008 31st Biennial Edition. Page 310. Peninsula Publishing. Tallahassee. 2007. ISBN 978-0-9765846-1-2 Softcover ISBN 978-0-9765846-2-9 Hardcover

Party political offices
First	Know Nothing nominee for Governor of Florida; 1856	Succeeded by None
Preceded by John Milton	Democratic nominee for Governor of Florida; 1865	Succeeded by George Washington Scott
Political offices
Preceded by William Marvin	Governor of Florida; December 20, 1865 – July 4, 1868	Succeeded by Harrison Reed
