= List of elections in 1880 =

The following elections occurred in the year 1880.

== Europe ==
- 1880 Belgian general election
- 1880 Bulgarian parliamentary election
- 1880 Italian general election
- 1880 Serbian parliamentary election
- 1880 Swiss constitutional referendum
- 1880 United Kingdom general election
- United Kingdom general election, 1880 (Ireland)
- United Kingdom general election, 1880 (Scotland)

== North America ==
=== United States ===
- 1880 New York state election
- 1880 United States elections

==== United States Presidential ====
- 1880 United States presidential election

==== United States Senate ====
- 1880 and 1881 United States Senate elections

==== United States House of Representatives ====
- 1880 United States House of Representatives elections
- 1880 United States House of Representatives elections in California
- 1880 United States House of Representatives elections in Florida
- 1880 United States House of Representatives elections in South Carolina

==== United States lieutenant gubernatorial ====
- 1880 Connecticut lieutenant gubernatorial election
- 1880 Illinois lieutenant gubernatorial election
- 1880 Missouri lieutenant gubernatorial election
- 1880 Nebraska lieutenant gubernatorial election
- 1880 Texas lieutenant gubernatorial election

==== United States gubernatorial ====
- 1880 Alabama gubernatorial election
- 1880 Arkansas gubernatorial election
- 1880 Colorado gubernatorial election
- 1880 Connecticut gubernatorial election
- 1880 Florida gubernatorial election
- 1880 Georgia gubernatorial election
- 1880 Illinois gubernatorial election
- 1880 Indiana gubernatorial election
- 1880 Kansas gubernatorial election
- 1880 Maine gubernatorial election
- 1880 Massachusetts gubernatorial election
- 1880 Michigan gubernatorial election
- 1880 Missouri gubernatorial election
- 1880 Nebraska gubernatorial election
- 1880 New Hampshire gubernatorial election
- 1880 New Jersey gubernatorial election
- 1880 North Carolina gubernatorial election
- 1880 Rhode Island gubernatorial election
- 1880 South Carolina gubernatorial election
- 1880 Tennessee gubernatorial election
- 1880 Texas gubernatorial election
- 1880 Vermont gubernatorial election
- 1880 West Virginia gubernatorial election

==== United States mayoral elections ====
- 1880 Boston mayoral election
- 1880 Manchester, New Hampshire mayoral election

== South America ==
- 1880 Argentine presidential election
- 1880 Colombian presidential election

== See also ==
- Category:1880 elections
