= 1896 Florida gubernatorial election =

- October 6, 1896
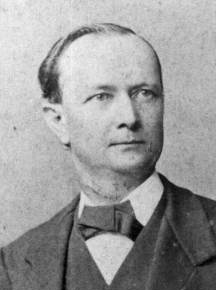

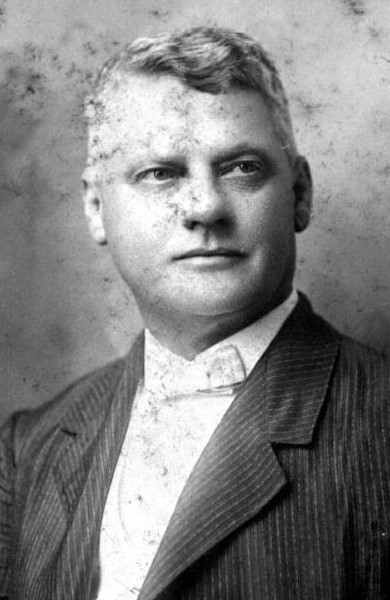

Nominee	William D. Bloxham	Edward R. Gunby	William A. Weeks
Party	Democratic	Republican	Populist
Popular vote	27,171	8,290	5,370
Percentage	66.55%	20.30%	13.15%

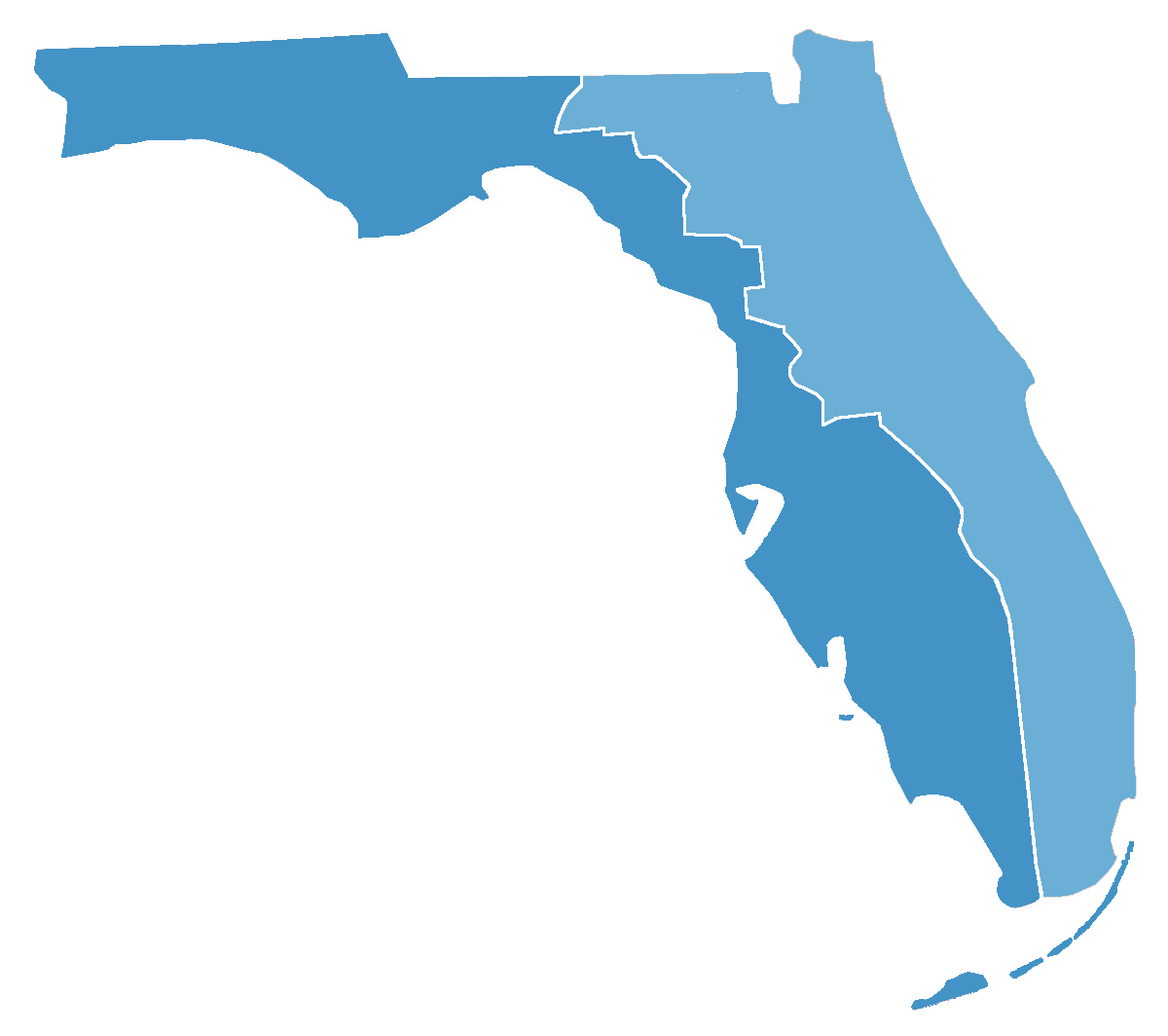
Bloxham
40–50%
50–60%
60–70%
70–80%
80–90%
>90%
Weeks
40–50%
50–60%
No Results
No Results
Governor before election
Henry L. Mitchell
Democratic
Elected Governor
William D. Bloxham
Democratic

The 1896 Florida gubernatorial election was held on October 6, 1896. Democratic nominee William D. Bloxham defeated Republican nominee Edward R. Gunby with 66.55% of the vote.

== General election ==
=== Candidates ===
Major party candidates

- William D. Bloxham, Democratic
- Edward R. Gunby, Republican

Other candidates

- William A. Weeks, People's

=== Results ===
1896 Florida gubernatorial election
Party	Candidate	Votes	%	±%
Democratic	William D. Bloxham	27,171	66.55%	
Republican	Edward R. Gunby	8,290	20.30%	
Populist	William A. Weeks	5,370	13.15%	
Majority		18,881		
Turnout				
Democratic hold		Swing		

==== Results by County ====
County	William D. Bloxham Democratic		Edward R. Gunby Republican		William A. Weeks Populist		Total votes
County	#	%	#	%	#	%	Total votes
Alachua	1,324	64.46%	592	28.82%	138	6.72%	2,054
Baker	0	0.00%	0	0.00%	0	0.00%	0
Bradford	615	58.18%	229	21.67%	213	20.15%	1,057
Brevard	547	68.12%	233	29.02%	23	2.86%	803
Calhoun	127	35.98%	27	7.65%	199	56.37%	353
Citrus	244	81.61%	14	4.68%	41	13.71%	299
Clay	352	64.47%	114	20.88%	80	14.65%	546
Columbia	618	65.74%	266	28.30%	56	5.96%	940
Dade	399	54.43%	321	43.79%	13	1.77%	733
DeSoto	541	54.10%	160	16.00%	299	29.90%	1,000
Duval	2,164	62.54%	1,031	29.80%	265	7.66%	3,460
Escambia	1,069	76.91%	99	7.12%	222	15.97%	1,390
Franklin	238	76.28%	71	22.76%	3	0.96%	312
Gadsden	414	87.71%	17	3.60%	41	8.69%	472
Hamilton	408	68.46%	70	11.74%	118	19.80%	596
Hernando	184	76.67%	12	5.00%	44	18.33%	240
Hillsborough	1,960	72.51%	507	18.76%	236	8.73%	2,703
Holmes	306	50.25%	25	4.11%	278	46.65%	609
Jackson	892	66.97%	205	15.39%	235	17.64%	1,332
Jefferson	1,374	88.30%	151	9.70%	31	1.99%	1,556
Lafayette	297	95.50%	11	3.54%	3	0.96%	311
Lake	688	73.50%	187	19.98%	61	6.52%	936
Lee	203	80.56%	42	16.67%	7	2.78%	252
Leon	1,373	89.10%	144	9.34%	24	1.56%	1,541
Levy	353	66.48%	92	17.33%	86	16.20%	531
Liberty	106	56.08%	34	17.99%	49	25.93%	189
Madison	316	62.20%	93	18.31%	99	19.49%	508
Manatee	661	85.40%	53	6.85%	60	7.75%	774
Marion	824	59.28%	247	17.77%	319	22.95%	1,390
Monroe	449	60.59%	275	37.11%	17	2.29%	741
Nassau	357	69.05%	116	22.44%	44	8.51%	517
Orange	1,043	65.93%	466	29.46%	73	4.61%	1,582
Osceola	210	52.50%	87	21.75%	103	25.75%	400
Pasco	407	72.94%	120	21.51%	31	5.56%	558
Polk	818	59.53%	200	14.56%	356	25.91%	1,374
Putnam	846	54.41%	585	37.62%	124	7.97%	1,555
Santa Rosa	454	76.82%	20	3.38%	117	19.80%	591
St. Johns	659	60.91%	336	31.05%	87	8.04%	1,082
Sumter	338	56.71%	72	12.08%	186	31.21%	596
Suwannee	758	73.52%	176	17.07%	97	9.41%	1,031
Taylor	164	42.49%	38	9.84%	184	47.67%	386
Volusia	772	55.94%	485	35.14%	123	8.91%	1,380
Wakulla	532	86.50%	65	10.57%	18	2.93%	615
Walton	430	52.70%	88	10.78%	298	36.52%	816
Washington	337	46.81%	114	20.30%	269	37.36%	720
Totals	27,171	66.55%	8,290	20.30%	5,370	13.15%	40,831

Counties that flipped from Populist to Democratic

- Liberty
- Walton

Counties that flipped from Tied to Democratic

- Washington
