= William D. Bloxham =

13th and 17th Governor of Florida

William Dunnington Bloxham
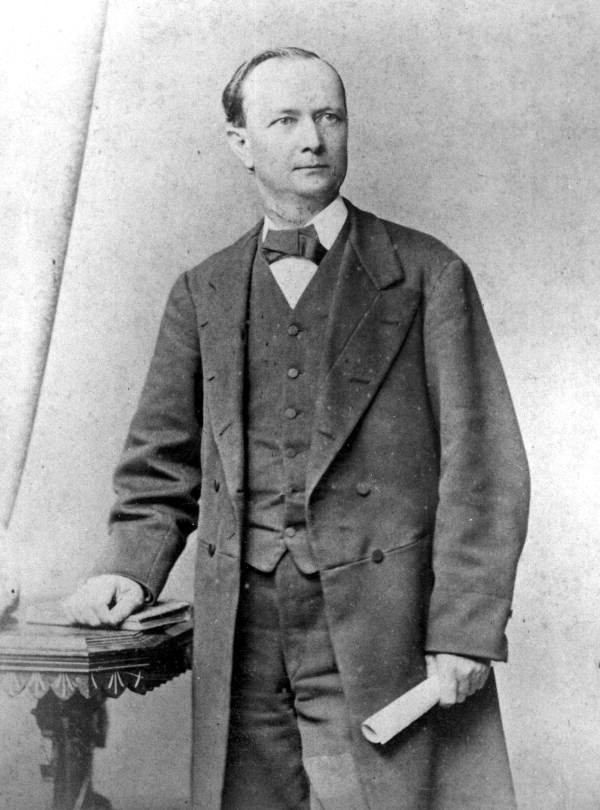

13th and 17th Governor of Florida
- In office January 4, 1881 – January 7, 1885
- Lieutenant: Livingston W. Bethel
- Preceded by: George F. Drew
- Succeeded by: Edward A. Perry
- In office January 5, 1897 – January 8, 1901
- Preceded by: Henry L. Mitchell
- Succeeded by: William Sherman Jennings

Comptroller of Florida
- In office May 1, 1890 – January 3, 1897
- Governor: Francis P. Fleming; Henry L. Mitchell
- Preceded by: William D. Barnes
- Succeeded by: William H. Reynolds

Secretary of State of Florida
- In office 1877–1880
- Governor: George F. Drew
- Preceded by: Samuel B. McLin
- Succeeded by: Frederick W. A. Rankin Jr.

Personal details
- Born: July 9, 1835 Leon County, Florida, U.S.
- Died: March 15, 1911 (aged 75) Tallahassee, Florida, U.S.
- Party: Democratic
- Spouse: Mary C. Davis Bloxham
- Education: College of William and Mary

William Dunnington Bloxham (July 9, 1835 – March 15, 1911) was the 13th and 17th Governor of Florida in two non-consecutive terms. Prior to his first term as governor, he served in the Florida House of Representatives. He was a Democrat.

His family had a plantation and he attended boarding schools in Virginia. He served in the Confederate army and opposed Reconstruction policies. As governor he sold off land for development.

In between his terms as governor, he served as state Comptroller when Francis P. Fleming was Governor. Bloxham was only the second governor of Florida to be born in the state.

== Early life and career ==
Bloxham was born on a plantation in Leon County, Florida, the son of William and Martha (Williams) Bloxham. His great-grandfather had migrated from England to manage George Washington's plantation and his grandfather lived through the War of 1812. His father was from Alexandria, Virginia, and moved to Leon County to run a plantation in 1825, becoming one of few white settlers in a Native American-dominated area. The elder William served in the Seminole Wars. Martha Bloxham was born in Twiggs County, Georgia, and moved to Florida as a child.

The younger Bloxham went to county school in Florida before being sent to preparatory school in Virginia at age 13. For the next seven years, he attended Virginian schools, including Rappahannock Academy where his teachers included eventual U.S. Senator William Mahone. Bloxham graduated from The College of William & Mary in 1855 and acquired a law degree from the college. He was admitted to the Florida Bar but, when his health declined, he travelled to Europe and chose the more active life of a planter when he returned. In November 1856, he and Mary C. Davis travelled to her home city of Lynchburg, Virginia, to be married.

Bloxham became interested in politics and actively campaigned for James Buchanan in the 1856 presidential election. In 1861, he was elected to the Florida House of Representatives without opposition. With the Civil War raging in 1862, Bloxham organized a company of infantry from Leon County which he commanded for the duration of the war. After the war, he staunchly opposed Reconstruction and, using his popularity as a speaker, was a leading voice among Florida Democrats. He served as a Presidential Elector for the Horatio Seymour/Francis Preston Blair Jr. Democratic ticket in the 1868 election.

== 1870 election controversy ==
In 1870, Bloxham was at the center of a political firestorm during one of Florida's most violent periods. The Republican "carpetbaggers" were attacked in Florida, often violently, by groups like the Ku Klux Klan. On Election Day of 1870, the most violent counties were inundated with federal troops at the request of Governor Harrison Reed. The chaos of that day included constitutional convention member, William Capers Bird, pointing a handgun at African American state senator Robert Meacham on the courthouse steps in Monticello, reportedly warning, "no damned nigger shall vote here."

When the voting finally ended, it appeared that Bloxham had won the Lieutenant Governor race. Republicans used the chaos of the day as an excuse for rejecting the votes of nine largely Democratic counties, but Bloxham sought an injunction from the Florida Circuit Courts to prevent tainted results from being announced. A circuit judge granted the injunction but a federal grand jury indicted the judge. With the circuit judge in jail, the Republican-led board of canvassers rejected enough ballots to overturn Bloxham's victory in favor of Republican Samuel T. Day.

Bloxham pushed the election dispute to the Florida Supreme Court, filing for a writ of mandamus on January 10, 1871, to force a recount. While the Florida Attorney General disagreed that a recount could be ordered, the Supreme Court Chief Justice sided with Bloxham. Republican legislators countered by repealing the law which created the board of canvassers in the first place and the Supreme Court was unable to compel the board to recount when the board effectively ceased to exist. Bloxham applied to the supreme court for a writ of quo warranto on February 20, 1871, to challenge Day's victory, but the case did not begin until November 15. On June 1, 1872, the court finally ruled that Bloxham had won the 1870 election, by which time he had missed every state senate session in the term, meaning the term was effectively concluded. Although he took the oath of office on June 3, he could not perform the lieutenant governor's only duty, which was to preside over the Senate. Thus, he is not named in lists of Florida's lieutenant governors. The ruling was the first win for the Florida Democratic Party since the war.

== Governorship and the Disston Land Purchase ==
In the summer of 1872, Bloxham was unanimously nominated at the Jacksonville Democratic Convention to run for Governor with Confederate General Robert Bullock as his running mate. In November, a severe Election Day storm reduced the vote count and Bloxham was defeated by Republican Ossian B. Hart by 1,200 votes. Hart, who had tried to claim Abijah Gilbert's U.S. Senate seat two years earlier, died barely a year into his term. Bloxham served on the State Democratic Executive Committee and actively participated in the successful gubernatorial campaign of George Franklin Drew, promising protection to African Americans who voted for him. Bloxham was named Secretary of State.

In June 1880, Bloxham was nominated again to run for governor and so resigned as Secretary of State. In his second attempt, he won the election by over 5,000 votes and was inaugurated on January 4, 1881. Bloxham inherited a state debt of $1 million and a lawsuit that placed a lien on millions of acres of Florida land. Before his first month as governor was complete, Bloxham and Florida signed an agreement with Philadelphia saw manufacturing heir, Hamilton Disston, whereby Disston would attempt to drain the Everglades and would receive half of the land he reclaimed. With Disston actively planning his drainage efforts, Bloxham personally travelled to Philadelphia to make an even larger deal with him. On June 14, 1881, Disston signed a contract to purchase four million acres (16,000 km^{2}) of Florida land, larger than the state of Connecticut, for $1 million, a purchase which made international news. When Disston and a second buyer, Sir Edward James Reed, paid in full, the state was out of debt and the first land boom soon followed.

Towards the end of Bloxham's first stint as governor, in 1884, call for revision to the Florida Constitution increased, fueled by division among the state's Democrats. Supporters of Bloxham's predecessor, George Franklin Drew, criticized Bloxham for the Disston Land Purchase as well as his apparent commitment to Florida Panhandle development at the expense of the rest of the state. They rallied around Confederate General Edward A. Perry and a call for a Constitutional Convention. In 1884, Bloxham lost the Democratic nomination to Perry; in 1885, voters approved the convention which led to the 1885 Florida Constitution.

== Second term ==
On April 18, 1885, Bloxham was appointed Minister Resident and Consul General to Bolivia by President Grover Cleveland. Bloxham took the oath of office but declined to report for the post. Instead, he accepted a November 1885 appointment to become the U.S. Surveyor General for Florida which he held until December 1889. When the state comptroller position became vacant on May 1, 1890, Governor Francis P. Fleming appointed Bloxham to fill it. Bloxham was unanimously nominated for the position in August 1890 and easily won the election, and was easily re-elected in 1892.

Comptroller Bloxham ran for governor and was victorious in 1896, 12 years after leaving the office. Despite his conservative reputation, Bloxham left his mark in his second term by reinstating and expanding the powers of a railroad commission, restricting monopolies and creating a statewide auditor to eliminate government fraud and waste. Fire insurance company regulation was initiated and women served as public notaries for the first time during Bloxham's second stint as governor.

William Bloxham died on March 15, 1911, in Tallahassee, Florida. A planned Bloxham County, Florida, centered around Williston, Florida, was rejected by a referendum in 1915.

== Plantation ==
Bloxham was a cotton planter in Leon County, Florida, and from the late 1850s owned the William D. Bloxham Plantation. He had 52 slaves.

== Notes ==
Party political offices
Preceded by George Washington Scott	Democratic nominee for Governor of Florida; 1872	Succeeded by George Franklin Drew
Preceded by George Franklin Drew	Democratic nominee for Governor of Florida; 1880	Succeeded by Edward A. Perry
Preceded by Henry L. Mitchell	Democratic nominee for Governor of Florida; 1896	Succeeded by William Sherman Jennings
Political offices
Preceded by George F. Drew	Governor of Florida; January 4, 1881 - January 7, 1885	Succeeded by Edward A. Perry
Preceded by Henry L. Mitchell	Governor of Florida; January 5, 1897 - January 8, 1901	Succeeded by William S. Jennings
Legal offices
Preceded by William D. Barnes	Comptroller of Florida; May 1, 1890 - January 3, 1897	Succeeded by William H. Reynolds
