= Metropolitan Light Infantry =

Company A, 146th Signal Battalion
- Active: 1887–
- Country: United States
- Allegiance: United States
- Branch: Florida Army National Guard
- Type: Signal (formerly Infantry and Quartermaster)
- Size: Company
- Garrison/HQ: Jacksonville, Florida
- Nicknames: "Metropolitan Light Infantry" "Jacksonville Rifles"
- Engagements: World War I World War II; Iraq War

Company A, 146th Signal Battalion is a unit of the Florida Army National Guard, stationed in Jacksonville, Florida. The company dates back to 1887 with the founding of the "Metropolitan Light Infantry". For its first 68 years the unit served as an infantry company and deployed as Company F, 124th Infantry during World War II. After WWII the unit reorganized again as infantry, then as a quartermaster company for eight years, and since February 1963 the Metropolitan Light Infantry has been a signal company.

== Founding and Spanish–American War service ==
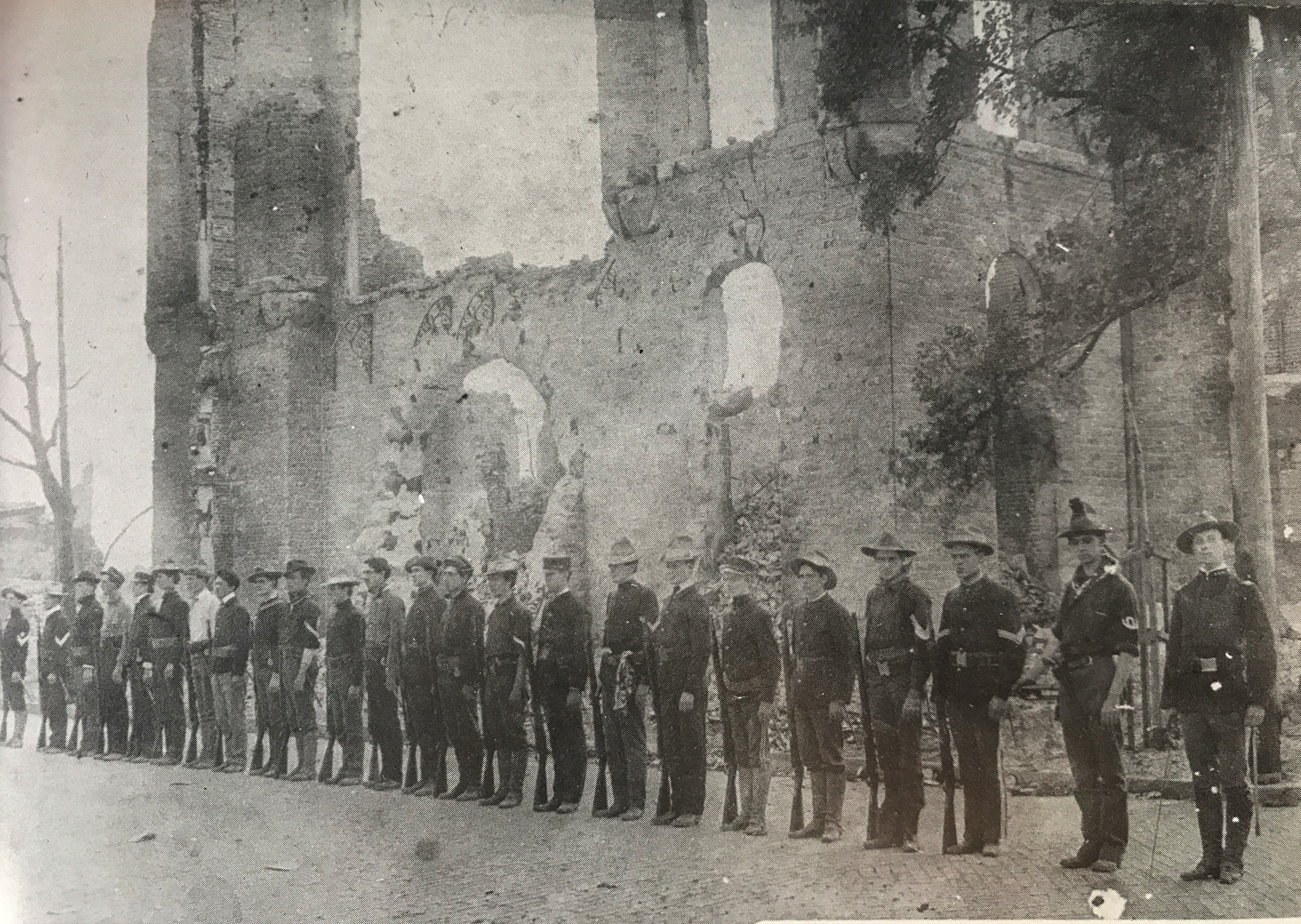
Jacksonville Rifles in front of their old armory after the May 3, 1901 fire of Jacksonville

The Metropolitan Light Infantry company was established on June 7, 1887 in Jacksonville, Florida. In 1893 it was redesignated Company C, 1st Battalion of Florida State Troops under the command of Captain L. H. Mattair. The company under command of Captain James Y. Wilson mustered for service during the Spanish–American War in Jacksonville and took a train at 9 o'clock P.M. on May 13, 1898 to Tampa, arriving the following morning. There they went to Fort Brooke and reorganized as Company F "Jacksonville Rifles", 1st Florida Infantry, mustering into Federal service on May 23. Four days later they marched two miles to Palmetto Beach where they made camp. On July 21 the company took a train to Fernandina arriving on the 22nd. On August 22, the company broke their camp and camped in the streets of Fernandina awaiting their train to Huntsville, Alabama the next morning. They arrived at Huntsville and encamped one mile outside of the city. The company mustered out of Federal service on January 24, 1899 in Huntsville and returned to Florida. In 1903, the Rifles were the first company to win the Florida State Troops' Taliaferro Trophy for marksmanship, a tall and valuable silver cup donated by Florida Senator James Taliaferro.

== World War I Service ==
The unit was mustered into federal service with the First Florida which was redesignated 124th Infantry and mobilized at Camp Wheeler, Georgia. The 124th Infantry deployed to France in July 1918 and was split up to fill other units. After the war, the unit was redesignated as Company F, 154th Infantry in 1921, and then again redesignated Company F, 124th Infantry in 1924.

== Interwar Years and World War II ==
Company F, 124th Infantry mobilized with its parent regiment on November 25, 1940 and trained at Camp Blanding, FL and then Fort Benning, GA. The unit inherits the campaign history and honors of Company F, 2nd Battalion, 124th Infantry which served in New Guinea and Mindanao in the Southern Philippines. Company F and the 124th Infantry were inactivated December 16, 1945 at Camp Stoneman, California

== Post World War II ==
The unit reorganized after WWII as Company F, 124th Infantry under Captain Edward R. Carmody. The unit converted in 1955, under the command of First Lieutenant William B. Smith, as Company B (Field Service), 48th Armored Quartermaster Battalion, part of the 48th Armored Division. On February 15, 1963 Company B and the Headquarters & Headquarters Detachment, 48th Quartermaster Battalion consolidated and converted to its present-day unit, Company C, 146th Signal Battalion.

== The Signal Company ==
In May 1972, Company C moved from the old armory at 851 Market Street to 9900 Normandy Blvd, Jacksonville.

Company C, along with the rest of the 146th Signal Battalion was mobilized and deployed to Iraq from November 23, 2008 to September 19, 2009 where the unit performed tactical and strategic communication network setup, which it earned an Army Meritorious Unit Citation for.

== Unit designations ==
- "Metropolitan Light Infantry", an independent company (June 7, 1887– )
- Company C "Metropolitan Light Infantry", 1st Battalion, Florida State Troops (1893– )
- Company F "Jacksonville Rifles", 1st Florida Volunteers (May 20, 1898 – 1920)
- Company H, 1st Florida Infantry (1920–1921)
- Company F, 154th Infantry (September 22, 1920 – May 12, 1924)
- Company F, 124th Infantry (May 12, 1924 – December 16, 1945)
- Company F, 124th Infantry (May 19, 1947 – November 1, 1955)
- Company B (Field Service), 48th Armored Quartermaster Battalion (November 1, 1955 – April 15, 1959)
- Company B (Field Service), 48th Quartermaster Battalion (Armored Division) (April 15, 1959 – February 15, 1963)
- Company C, 146th Signal Battalion (February 15, 1963 – October 1, 1975)
- Company A, 146th Signal Battalion (October 1, 1975 – )

== Decorations ==
| Ribbon | Award | Streamer embroidered | Order No. |
|---|---|---|---|
| Dark blue ribbon with a gold border | Presidential Unit Citation (Army) | NEW GUINEA 12 JULY – 1 AUGUST 1944 | War Department General Order 38-46 |
| | Philippine Presidential Unit Citation | 17 OCTOBER 1944 TO 4 JULY 1945 | Department of the Army General Order 47-50 |
| Red ribbon | Meritorious Unit Commendation | IRAQ 23 NOVEMBER 2008 TO 19 SEPTEMBER 2009 | Permanent Orders 351-10, 15 August 2007 |

== Commanders ==
CPT W. J. L'Engle, Commanded Metropolitan Light Infantry, 1883–1884.

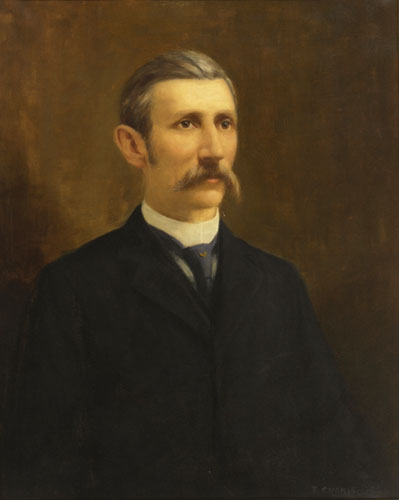
CPT Francis P. Fleming, Commanded Company C, 1st Florida Battalion (redesignated Co B, 1st Battalion, Florida State Troops in 1887), 1885–1888. Previously, in the Civil War, he enlisted in St. Augustine Rifles, 2nd Florida, then commissioned in 1st Florida Cavalry. Later, 15th Governor of Florida from 1889–1893.

CPT J. B. Morells, Commanded Company B, 1st Battalion, Florida State Troops, circa 1888 - .

CPT L. H. Mattair, Commanded Company C, 1st Battalion, Florida State Troops, 7/29/1891 – circa 1894.

CPT William LeFils, Commanded Company C "Jacksonville Rifles", 1st Battalion, Florida State Troops, 9/21/1895 - .

CPT James Y. Wilson, Commanded Company F, 1st Florida Volunteer Regiment, 1898- ., Commanded during their federal service in support of the Spanish–American War.

CPT Thomas C. Watts, Commanded Company F "Jacksonville Rifles", 1st Battalion, Florida State Troops, 9/23/1899

CPT William LeFils, Commanded Company F "Jacksonville Rifles", 1st Battalion, Florida State Troops, 1901 - .

CPT George J. Garcia, Commanded Company F, 154th Infantry Regiment, 9/22/1920- ., Stood up the company after WWI.

CPT Charles W. Bunker, Commanded Company F, 154th Infantry Regiment, 6/6/1922- .

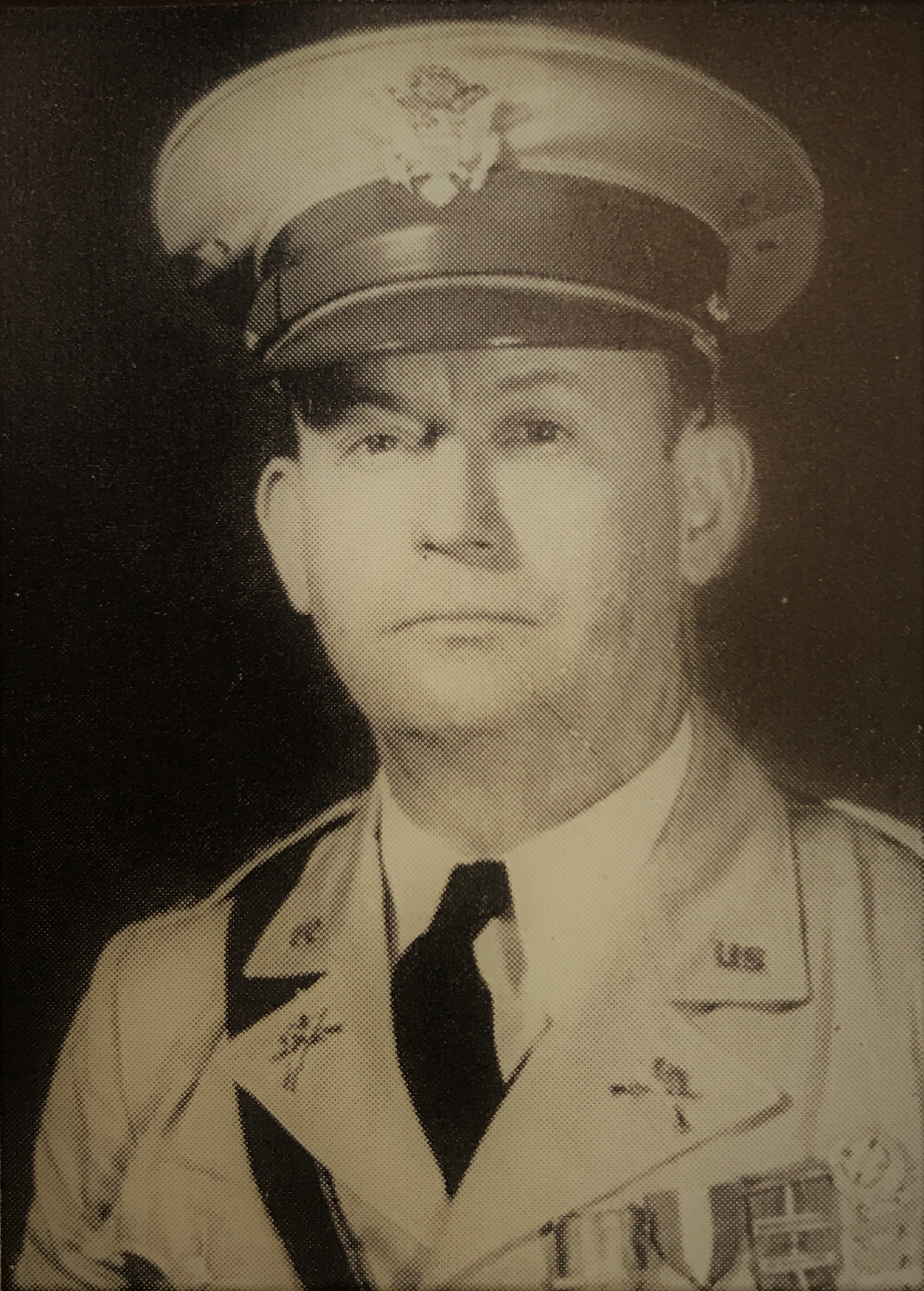
CPT Frank M. Whiddon, Commanded Company F, 124th Infantry, circa 1939 - 1941.

== See also ==
- Troop C, 1-153 Cavalry
- Escambia Rifles
- Suwannee Rifles
- Franklin Guards
