= 1892 Florida gubernatorial election =

- October 4, 1892
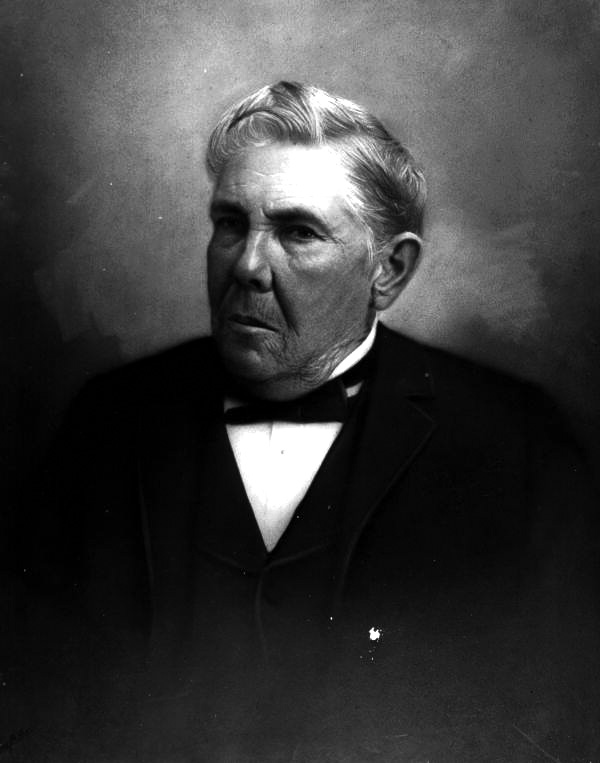

Nominee	Henry L. Mitchell	Alonzo P. Baskin
Party	Democratic	Populist
Popular vote	32,064	8,379
Percentage	78.70%	20.57%

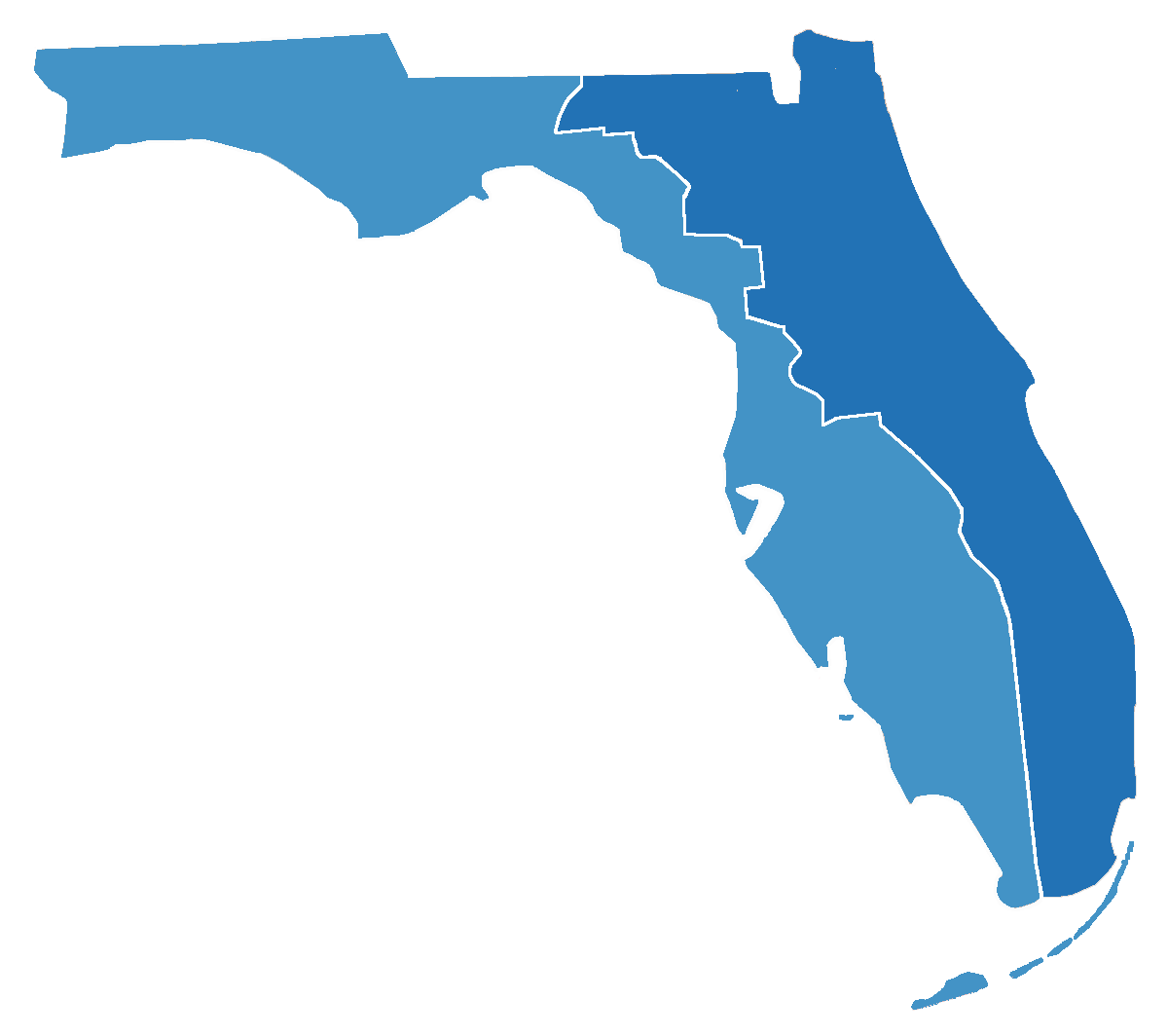
Fleming
50–59%
60–69%
70–79%
80–89%
90–100%
Baskin
50–59%
Tie
Governor before election
Francis P. Fleming
Democratic
Elected Governor
Henry L. Mitchell
Democratic

The 1892 Florida gubernatorial election was held on October 4, 1892. Democratic nominee Henry L. Mitchell defeated People's Party nominee Alonzo P. Baskin with 78.70% of the vote.

== General election ==
=== Candidates ===
Major party candidates

- Henry L. Mitchell, Democratic, Florida Supreme Court Justice and former State Representative.

Other candidates

- Alonzo P. Baskin (People's), former member of the Florida House of Representatives.
- N. J. Hawley, Prohibition

=== Results ===
1892 Florida gubernatorial election
Party	Candidate	Votes	%	±%
Democratic	Henry L. Mitchell	32,064	78.70%	
Populist	Alonzo P. Baskin	8,379	20.57%	
Prohibition	N. J. Hawley	297	0.73%	
Majority		23,685		
Turnout				
Democratic hold		Swing		

==== Results by County ====
County	Henry L. Mitchell Democratic		Alonzo P. Baskin Populist		N. J. Hawley Prohibition		Total votes
County	#	%	#	%	#	%	Total votes
Alachua	1,502	81.72%	304	16.54%	32	1.74%	1,838
Baker	187	48.20%	201	51.79%	0	0.00%	388
Bradford	668	69.87%	288	30.13%	0	0.00%	956
Brevard	441	92.45%	27	5.66%	9	1.89%	477
Calhoun	172	47.38%	188	51.79%	3	0.83%	363
Citrus	308	70.64%	127	29.13%	1	0.23%	436
Clay	438	75.26%	142	24.40%	2	0.34%	582
Columbia	755	84.36%	140	15.64%	0	0.00%	895
Dade	171	95.53%	0	0.00%	8	4.47%	179
DeSoto	629	56.41%	484	43.41%	2	0.18%	1,115
Duval	1,645	92.89%	120	6.78%	6	0.34%	1,771
Escambia	2,103	95.20%	106	4.80%	0	0.00%	2,209
Franklin	268	85.08%	47	14.92%	0	0.00%	315
Gadsden	568	78.13%	154	21.18%	5	0.69%	727
Hamilton	628	71.85%	246	28.15%	0	0.00%	874
Hernando	279	77.29%	81	22.44%	1	0.28%	361
Hillsborough	2,849	89.90%	271	8.55%	49	1.55%	3,169
Holmes	318	54.83%	262	45.17%	0	0.00%	580
Jackson	1,167	89.98%	130	10.02%	0	0.00%	1,297
Jefferson	2,425	100.00%	0	0.00%	0	0.00%	2,425
Lafayette	367	73.99%	129	26.01%	0	0.00%	496
Lake	1,064	82.80%	169	13.15%	52	4.05%	1,285
Lee	192	96.97%	6	3.03%	0	0.00%	198
Leon	1,492	100.00%	0	0.00%	0	0.00%	1,492
Levy	463	66.05%	237	33.81%	1	0.14%	701
Liberty	124	47.51%	137	52.49%	0	0.00%	261
Madison	710	92.45%	57	7.42%	1	0.13%	768
Manatee	325	55.65%	255	43.66%	4	0.68%	584
Marion	1,145	64.87%	611	34.62%	9	0.51%	1,765
Monroe	430	71.67%	157	26.17%	13	2.17%	600
Nassau	706	91.81%	63	8.19%	0	0.00%	769
Orange	1,291	92.41%	64	4.58%	42	3.01%	1,397
Osceola	211	90.17%	23	9.83%	0	0.00%	234
Pasco	475	70.16%	200	29.54%	2	0.30%	677
Polk	770	56.53%	577	42.36%	15	1.10%	1,362
Putnam	888	77.42%	221	19.27%	38	3.31%	1,147
Santa Rosa	435	66.92%	215	33.08%	0	0.00%	650
St. Johns	586	93.31%	42	6.69%	0	0.00%	628
Sumter	450	54.61%	372	45.15%	2	0.24%	824
Suwannee	656	71.38%	263	28.62%	0	0.00%	919
Taylor	162	41.54%	228	58.46%	0	0.00%	390
Volusia	808	83.99%	149	15.49%	5	0.52%	962
Wakulla	178	54.10%	151	45.90%	0	0.00%	329
Walton	325	46.23%	375	53.34%	3	0.17%	703
Washington	290	49.91%	290	49.91%	1	0.17%	581
Actual Totals	32,064	78.82%	8,309	20.43%	306	0.75%	40,679
Official Totals	32,064	78.84%	8,309	20.43%	297	0.73%	40,670

Counties that flipped from Democratic to Populist

- Baker
- Calhoun
- Liberty
- Taylor
- Walton

Counties that flipped from Democratic to Tied

- Washington

Counties that flipped from Republican to Democratic

- Duval
- Monroe
- Putnam
- Volusia
