= 1884 Florida gubernatorial election =

- November 4, 1884
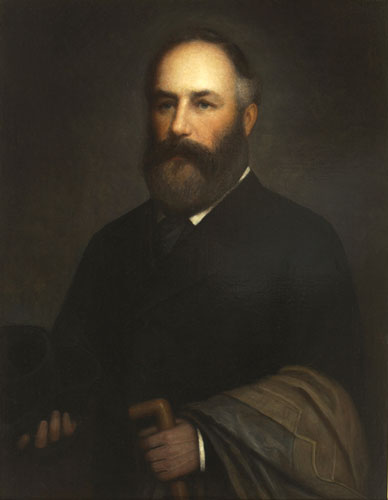

Nominee	Edward A. Perry	Frank W. Pope
Party	Democratic	Republican
Popular vote	32,096	27,865
Percentage	53.53%	46.47%

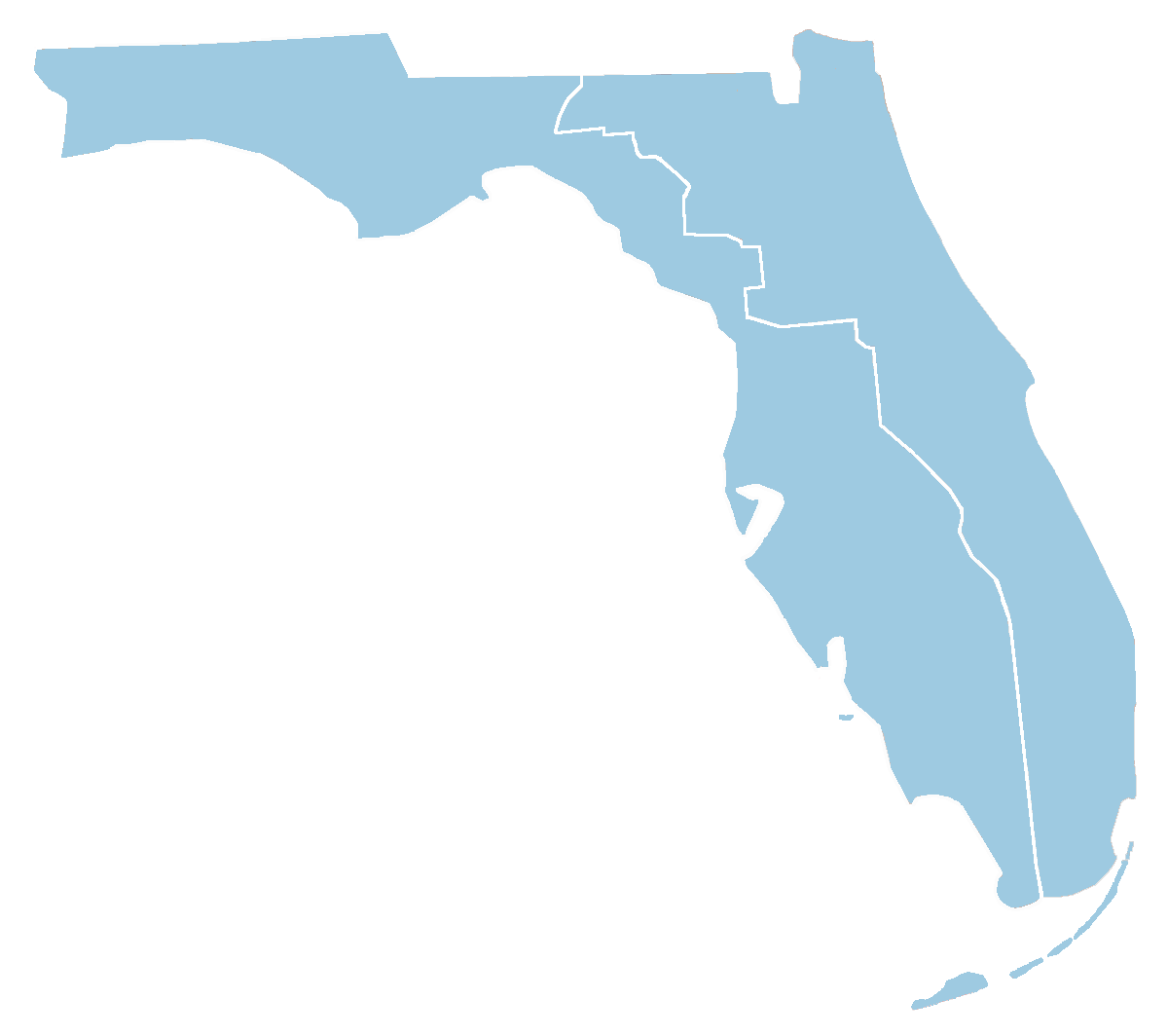
Perry
50–60%
60–70%
70–80%
80–90%
>90%
Pope
50–60%
60–70%
70–80%
Governor before election
William D. Bloxham
Democratic
Elected Governor
Edward A. Perry
Democratic

In the 1884 Florida gubernatorial election held on November 4, 1884, Democratic nominee Edward A. Perry defeated Republican nominee Frank W. Pope, securing 53.53% of the vote. Republicans did not carry Jefferson in a gubernatorial election again until 2018. As of 2022, this is the last time that a Republican gubernatorial nominee has carried Alachua and Leon.

== General election ==
=== Candidates ===
==== Democratic ====
- Edward A. Perry

==== Republican ====
- Frank W. Pope

=== Results ===
1884 Florida gubernatorial election
Party	Candidate	Votes	%	±%
Democratic	Edward A. Perry	32,096	53.53%	
Republican	Frank W. Pope	27,865	46.47%	

==== Results by county ====
County	Edward A. Perry Democratic		Frank W. Pope Republican		Total votes
County	#	%	#	%	Total votes
Alachua	1,785	46.65%	2,041	53.35%	3,826
Baker	328	63.81%	186	36.19%	514
Bradford	972	75.64%	313	24.36%	1,285
Brevard	329	79.47%	85	20.53%	414
Calhoun	191	55.36%	154	44.64%	345
Clay	513	62.79%	304	37.21%	817
Columbia	1,045	51.86%	970	48.14%	2,015
Dade	45	67.16%	22	32.84%	67
Duval	1,999	37.96%	3,267	62.04%	5,266
Escambia	1,907	50.95%	1,836	49.05%	3,743
Franklin	277	56.30%	215	43.70%	492
Gadsden	1,086	55.98%	854	44.02%	1,940
Hamilton	638	49.96%	639	50.04%	1,277
Hernando	1,058	80.64%	254	19.36%	1,312
Hillsborough	1,287	80.29%	316	19.71%	1,603
Holmes	352	76.86%	106	23.14%	458
Jackson	1,421	55.42%	1,143	44.58%	2,564
Jefferson	743	32.66%	1,532	67.34%	2,275
Lafayette	298	81.87%	66	18.13%	364
Leon	860	28.38%	2,170	71.62%	3,030
Levy	658	66.33%	334	33.67%	992
Liberty	163	60.59%	106	39.41%	269
Madison	545	43.97%	629	53.58%	1,174
Manatee	682	77.85%	194	22.15%	876
Marion	1,541	43.97%	1,964	56.03%	3,505
Monroe	905	50.64%	882	49.36%	1,787
Nassau	783	47.08%	880	52.92%	1,663
Orange	1,959	64.38%	1,084	35.62%	3,043
Polk	765	91.84%	68	8.16%	833
Putnam	1,154	51.29%	1,096	48.71%	2,250
Santa Rosa	801	62.82%	474	37.18%	1,275
St. Johns	721	58.33%	515	41.67%	1,236
Sumter	1,134	68.64%	518	31.36%	1,652
Suwannee	965	55.24%	782	44.76%	1,747
Taylor	187	52.97%	166	47.03%	353
Volusia	929	54.39%	779	45.61%	1,708
Wakulla	375	68.93%	169	31.07%	544
Walton	458	52.10%	421	47.90%	879
Washington	237	41.73%	331	58.27%	568
Actual Totals	32,096	53.53%	27,865	46.47%	59,961
Official Totals	32,087	53.54%	27,845	46.46%	59,932

Counties that flipped from Democratic to Republican

- Hamilton
- Madison
- Washington
