= 1880 Texas lieutenant gubernatorial election =

- November 2, 1880
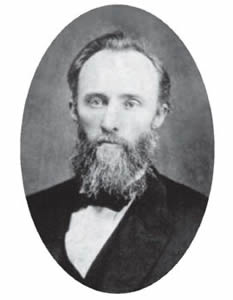

| Nominee | Leonidas Jefferson Storey | August Siemering | George W. Givens |
| Party | Democratic | Republican | Greenback |
| Popular vote | 172,610 | 63,066 | 30,838 |
| Percentage | 64.77% | 23.66% | 11.57% |
Lieutenant Governor before election
Joseph D. Sayers
Democratic
Elected Lieutenant Governor
Leonidas Jefferson Storey
Democratic

The 1880 Texas lieutenant gubernatorial election was held on November 2, 1880, in order to elect the lieutenant governor of Texas. Democratic candidate and Leonidas Jefferson Storey won a three-way race against Republican candidate August Siemering and Greenback Party candidate George W. Givens.

== General election ==
Incumbent lieutenant governor Joseph D. Sayers did not run for reelection. The "Young Democracy" faction of the party nominated him a candidate for governor against the incumbent Oran M. Roberts, Roberts won renomination on the first ballot. State senator Leonidas J. Storey, an ally of Roberts, was selected as the Democratic nominee.

The Greenback Party was motivated by their success in the previous election in which they won twelve seats in the legislature and elected George W. Jones to Congress. At their convention George W. Givens was nominated to be their candidate for lieutenant governor.

The Republican party selected August Siemering, the publisher of a major Republican newspaper in the state, as their candidate for Lieutenant governor.

At the time, Texas was part of the "Solid South" and the Democratic Party was heavily favored in elections. On November 2, 1880, Storey won the election by a wide margin.

=== Candidates ===
- Leonidas Jefferson Storey, state senator, lawyer, former state representative, Captain in the CSA's 26th Texas Cavalry Regiment (Democrat)
- August Siemering, publisher of the German language newspaper Freie Presse Für Texas, former teacher (Republican)
- George W. Givens, farmer (Greenback)
- William L. Crawford, lawyer, delegate of the 1875 Constitutional Convention, colonel in the Confederate army (Democratic) (withdrawn)
- John H. Cochran, Speaker of the Texas House of Representatives, former tax collector, former Texas Ranger, member of the 6th Texas Cavalry (Democratic)(withdrawn)

=== Results ===
Texas lieutenant gubernatorial election, 1880
| Party | Candidate | Votes | % | ±% |
|---|---|---|---|---|
| Democratic | Leonidas Jefferson Storey | 172,610 | 64.77 | ▼3.51 |
| Republican | August Siemering | 63,066 | 23.66 | ▲13.77 |
| Greenback | George W. Givens | 30,838 | 11.57 | ▼10.09 |
| Total votes | | 266,514 | 100.00 | |
| Democratic hold | | | | |
