= 1880 United Kingdom general election =

- 31 March – 27 April 1880

All 652 seats in the House of Commons 327 seats needed for a majority
- Turnout: 3,359,416; 72.2% (▲5.8 pp)
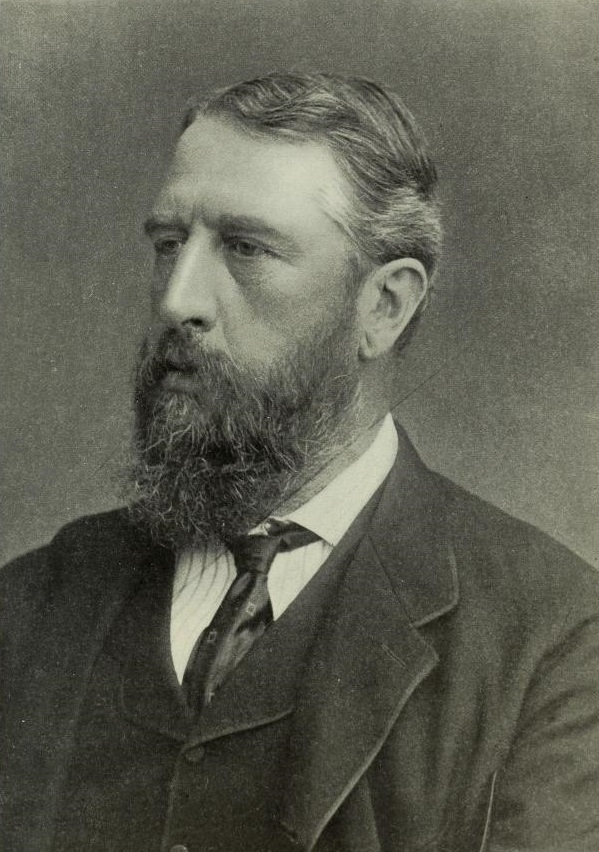

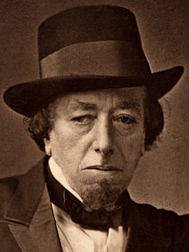
	First party	Second party	Third party
			HRL
Leader	Marquess of Hartington	The Earl of Beaconsfield	William Shaw
Party	Liberal	Conservative	Home Rule
Leader since	January 1875	27 February 1868	May 1879
Leader's seat	North East Lancashire	House of Lords	County Cork
Last election	242 seats, 52.0%	350 seats, 44.3%	60 seats, 3.7%
Seats won	352 (Note: The seat and vote count figures for the Liberals given here include the Speaker of the House of Commons)	237	63
Seat change	▲110	▼113	▲3
Popular vote	1,836,423	1,426,349	95,528
Percentage	54.7%	42.5%	2.8%
Swing	▲2.7 pp	▼1.8 pp	▼0.9 pp
- Colours denote the winning party

- Composition of the House of Commons after the election
Prime Minister before election
Earl of Beaconsfield
Conservative
Prime Minister after the election
William Gladstone
Liberal

The 1880 United Kingdom general election was held from 31 March to 27 April 1880. It saw the Liberal opposition triumph with 352 seats.

Its intense rhetoric was led by the Midlothian campaign of the Liberals, particularly the fierce oratory of Liberal leader William Gladstone. He vehemently attacked the foreign policy of the government of Benjamin Disraeli, Earl of Beaconsfield, as utterly immoral. The endeavours of the Disraeli government in Africa, India, Afghanistan and Europe, which were only partially successful and often accompanied by early, humiliating defeats, gave a good deal of fodder to Gladstone for his attacks. Further, Disraeli's favoured dealing with the Turks, who were responsible for horrendous atrocities against Balkan Christians also laid him open to religious attacks, especially in Gladstone's pamphlet "The Bulgarian Horrors and the Question of the East" (1876). Gladstone's campaign was a synthesis of the two approaches in a populist manner adapted towards liberalism.

The Liberals secured one of their largest-ever majorities, leaving the Conservatives a distant second. As a result of the campaign, the Liberal Commons leader, Lord Hartington and that in the Lords, Lord Granville, stood back in favour of Gladstone, who thus became Prime Minister a second time. It was the last general election in which any party other than the Conservatives won a majority of the total votes (rather than a mere plurality), as well the only time (except for 1906) until 1945 in which any party other than the Conservatives won a parliamentary majority.

== Issues ==
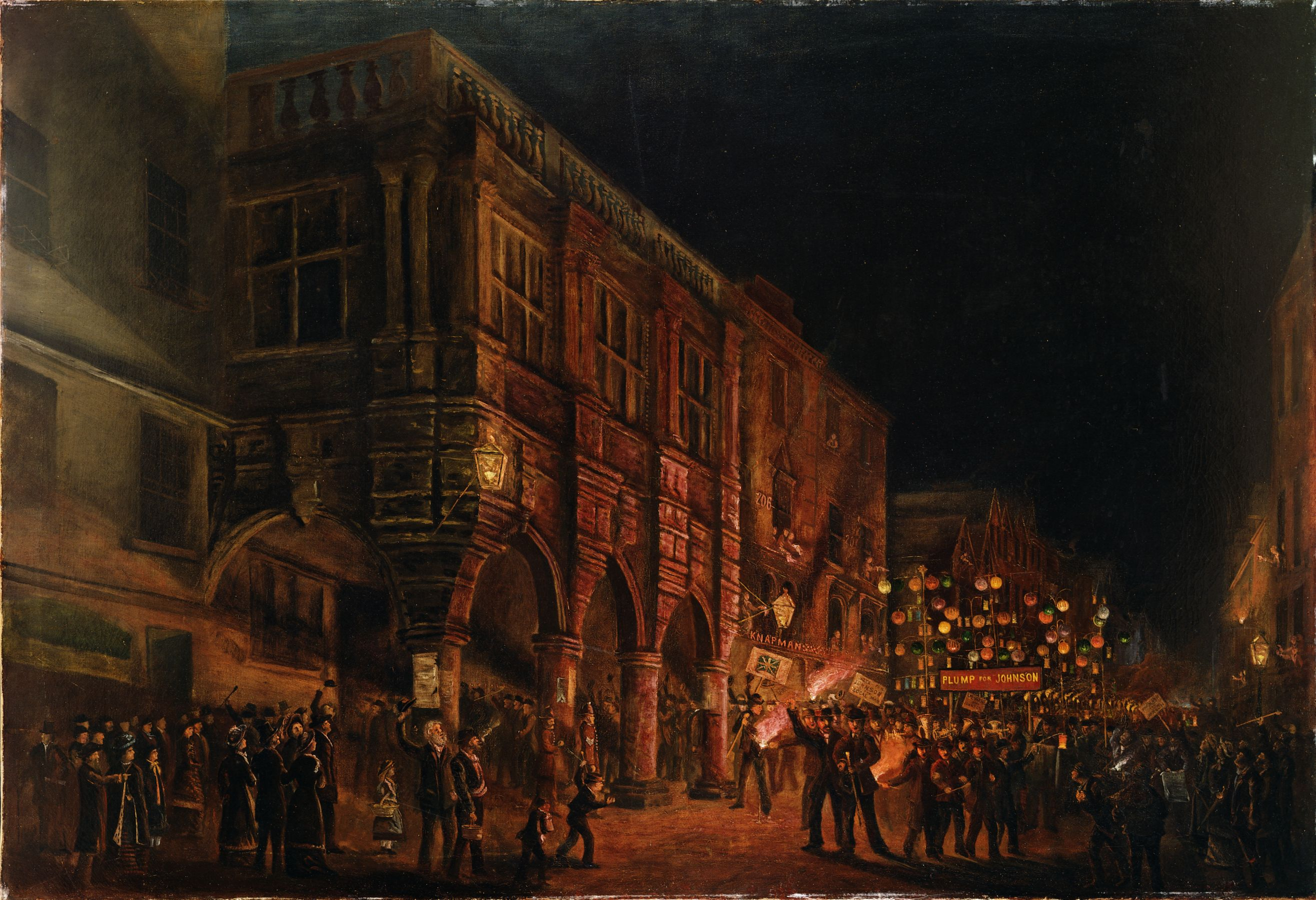
A painting by Alfred George Palmer of election night outside Exeter Guildhall in the collection of the Royal Albert Memorial Museum (333/1997).

The Conservative government was doomed by the poor condition of the British economy and the vulnerability of its foreign policy to moralistic attacks by the Liberals. William Gladstone, appealing to moralistic evangelicals, led the attack on the foreign policy of Benjamin Disraeli (now known as Lord Beaconsfield) as immoral. Historian Paul Smith paraphrases the rhetorical tone which focused on attacking "Beaconsfieldism" (in Smith's words) as a:

Sinister system of policy, which not merely involved the country in immoral, vainglorious and expensive external adventures, inimical to peace and to the rights of small peoples, but aimed at nothing less than the subversion of parliamentary government in favour of some simulacrum of the oriental despotism its creator was alleged to admire.

Smith notes that there was indeed some substance to the allegations, but: "Most of this was partisan extravaganza, worthy of its target's own excursions against the Whigs."

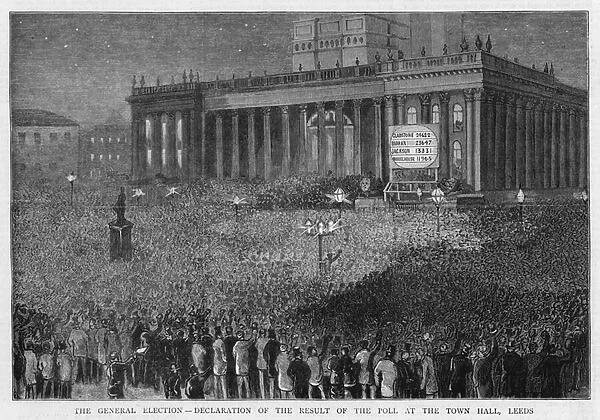
Crowds wait outside Leeds Town Hall to hear the result

Disraeli himself was now the Earl of Beaconsfield in the House of Lords, and custom did not allow peers to campaign; this denuded the Conservatives of other important figures such as the Marquess of Salisbury and Lord Cranbrook, and the party was unable to deal effectively with the rhetorical onslaught. Although he had improved the organisation of the Conservative Party, Disraeli was firmly based in the rural gentry, and had little contact with or understanding of the urban middle class that was increasingly dominating his party.

Besides their trouble with foreign policy issues, it was even more important that the Conservatives were unable to effectively defend their economic record on the home front. The 1870s coincided with a long-term global depression caused by the collapse of the worldwide railway boom of the 1870s which previously had been so profitable to Britain. The stress was growing by the late 1870s; prices fell, profits fell, employment fell, and there was downward pressure on wage rates that caused much hardship among the industrial working class. The free trade system supported by both parties made Britain defenceless against the flood of cheap wheat from North America, which was exacerbated by the worst harvest of the century in Britain in 1879. The party in power got the blame, and Liberals repeatedly emphasised the growing budget deficit as a measure of bad stewardship. In the election itself, Disraeli's party lost heavily up and down the line, especially in Scotland and Ireland, and in the urban boroughs. His Conservative strength fell from 351 to 238, while the Liberals jumped from 250 to 353. Disraeli resigned on 21 April 1880.

== Results ==

UK General Election 1880
Party	Candidates						Votes		
Party	Stood	Elected	Gained	Unseated	Net	% of total	%	No.	Net %
Liberal	499	352	+132	-22	+110	53.99	54.66	1,836,423	+2.7
Conservative	521	237	+20	-133	−113	36.35	42.46	1,426,351	−1.8
Home Rule	81	63	+6	-3	+3	9.66	2.84	95,535	−0.9
Independent	2	0	0	0	0	0	0.03	1,107	0

=== Voting summary ===
Popular vote
Liberal	54.66%
Conservative	42.46%
Home Rule	2.84%
Others	0.03%

=== Seats summary ===
Parliamentary seats
Liberal	53.99%
Conservative	36.35%
Home Rule	9.66%

== Regional results ==
=== Great Britain ===
Largest party in each constituent country

Party	Seats	Seats change	Votes	%	% change
Liberal	334	▲104	1,780,171	57.3	▲1.9
Lib-Lab	3	▲1	1,780,171	57.3	▲1.9
Conservative	214	▼105	1,326,744	42.7	▼1.9
Other	0	Same position	1,107	0.04	▲0.04
Total	551	Same position	3,108,022	100	

==== England ====
Party	Seats	Seats change	Votes	%	% change
Liberal	251	▲82	1,519,576	56.2	▲2.4
Lib-Lab	3	▲1	1,519,576	56.2	▲2.4
Conservative	197	▼83	1,205,990	43.7	▼2.5
Other	0	Same position	1,107	0.1	▲0.1
Total	451		2,726,673	100	

==== Scotland ====
Party	Seats	Seats change	Votes	%	% change
Liberal	52	▲12	195,517	70.1	▲1.7
Conservative	6	▼12	74,145	29.9	▼1.7
Total	58		269,662	100	

==== Wales ====
Party	Seats	Seats change	Votes	%	% change
Liberal	29	▲10	50,403	58.8	▼2.1
Conservative	4	▼10	41,106	41.2	▲2.1
Total	33		100,509	100	

==== Ireland ====
Party	Seats	Seats change	Votes	%	% change
Home Rule	63	▲3	95,535	37.5	▼2.1
Irish Conservative	23	▼8	99,607	39.8	▼1.0
Liberal	15	▲5	56,252	22.7	▲4.3
Total	101		251,394	100	

==== Universities ====
Party	Seats	Seats change	Votes	%	% change
Conservative	7		5,503	49.2	
Liberal	2		5,675	50.8	
Total	9		11,178	100	

== See also ==
- List of MPs elected in the 1880 United Kingdom general election
- 1880 United Kingdom general election in Ireland
- 1880 United Kingdom general election in Scotland

== Sources and further reading ==
- Blake, Robert (1967), Disraeli, EA London, ISBN 978-1-84413-312-3
- Chilston, Viscount. "The 1880 Election: A Historical Landmark." Parliamentary Affairs 14 (June 1961): 477–492.
- Craig, F. W. S. (1989), British Electoral Facts: 1832–1987, Dartmouth: Gower, ISBN 0900178302
- Fitzsimons, M. A. (1960), "Midlothian: the Triumph and Frustration of the British Liberal Party", Review of Politics, 22 (2): 187–201, doi:10.1017/S0034670500008202, JSTOR 1405317, S2CID 144807807
- Lloyd, T.O. The General Election of 1880 (Oxford UP, 1967)
- Matthew, H. C. G. (1997), Gladstone: 1809–1898, Clarendon Press, ISBN 0-19-820696-8
- Rallings, Colin; Thrasher, Michael, eds. (2000), British Electoral Facts 1832–1999, Ashgate Publishing Ltd
- Roberts, Matthew. "Election Cartoons and Political Communication In Victorian England.' Cultural & Social History (2013) 10#3 pp 369–395, covers 1860 to 1890.
- Smith, Paul (1996), Disraeli: A Brief Life, Cambridge UP, ISBN 9780521381505
