= Bloxham County, Florida =

Proposed county in Florida, United States

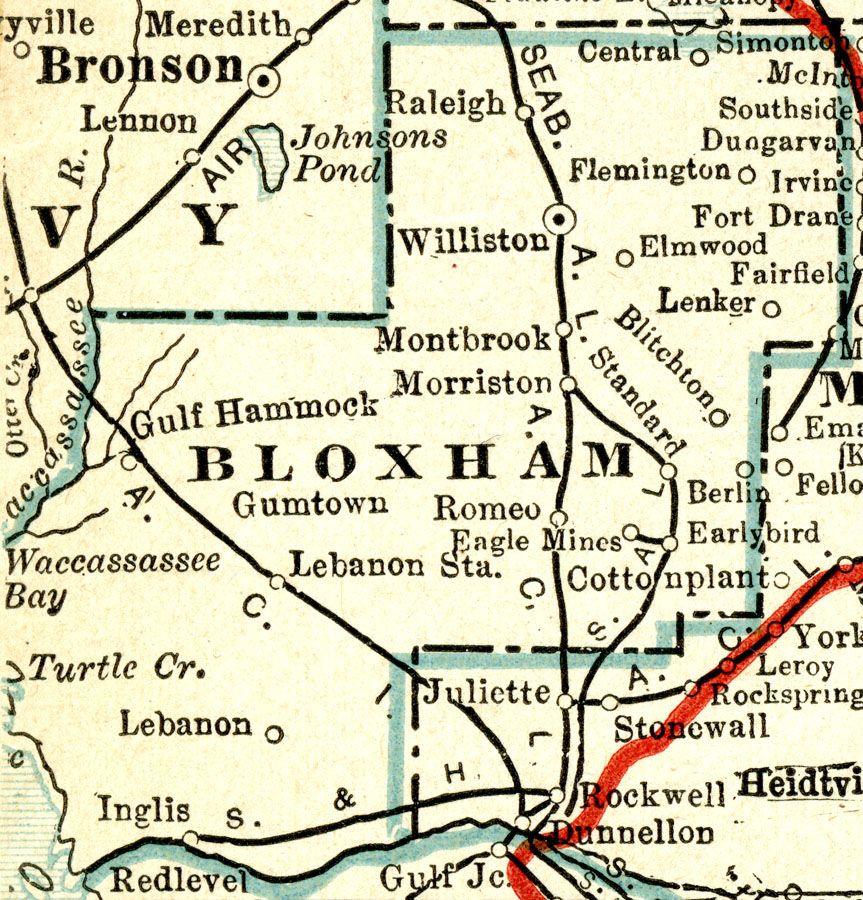
Proposed boundaries

Bloxham County was a proposed Florida, United States county which was never created. Bloxham existed as a county on paper only, the voters refusing to approve its establishment. The County seat was to be Williston, Florida. Bloxham County was named for William D. Bloxham, who was the thirteenth and seventeenth state governor. Bloxham was proposed in 1914 and consisted of land taken from Levy and Marion Counties. The county idea was abandoned in 1915 after failing to receive enough votes in a referendum.
