= 1880 United States presidential election in Florida =

- November 2, 1880
- Turnout: 19.15% of the total population ▼5.77 pp
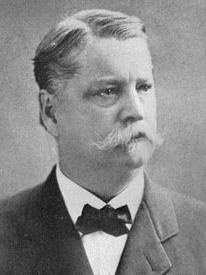

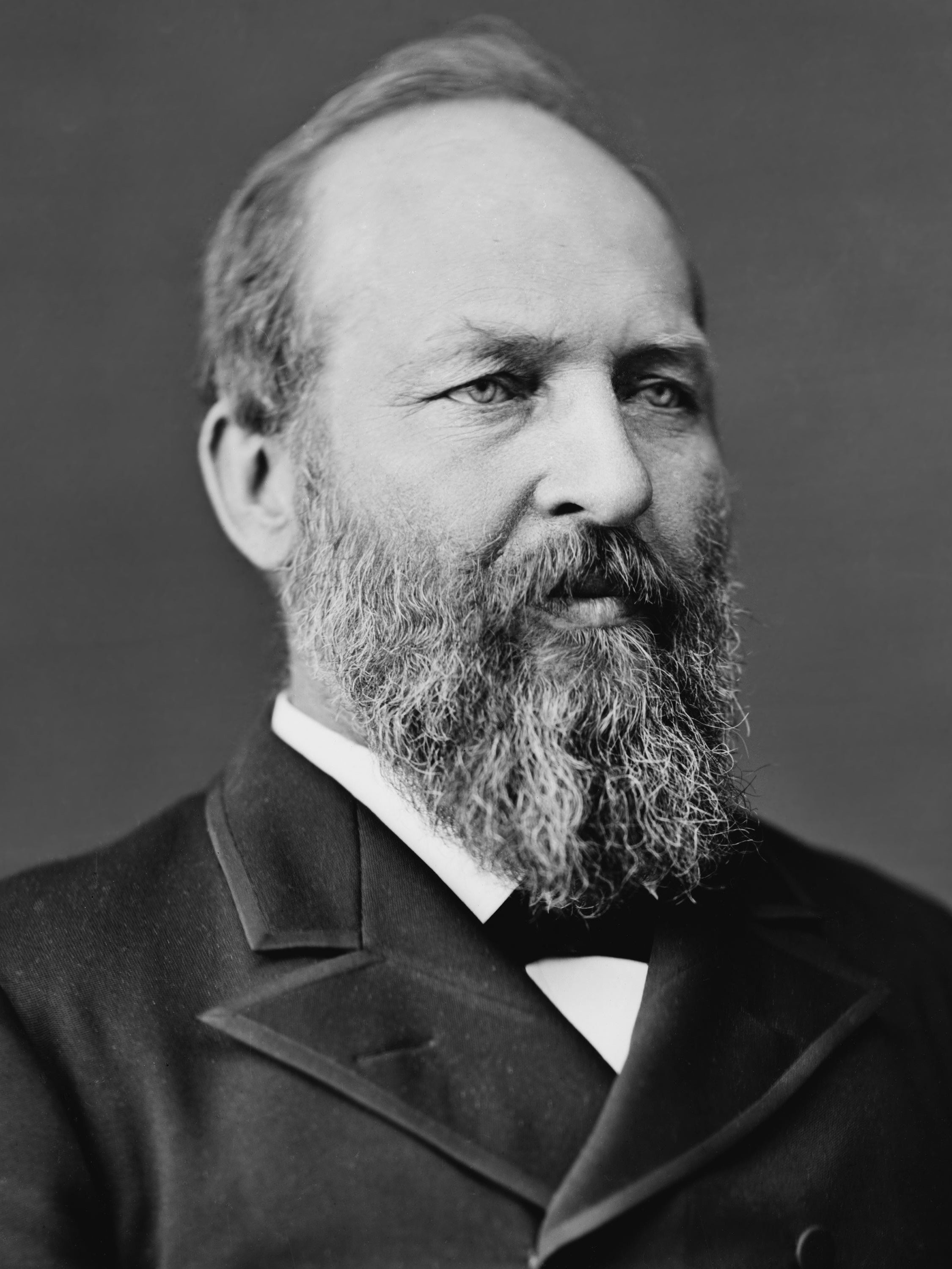
Nominee	Winfield Scott Hancock	James A. Garfield
Party	Democratic	Republican
Home state	Pennsylvania	Ohio
Running mate	William Hayden English	Chester A. Arthur
Electoral vote	4	0
Popular vote	27,964	23,654
Percentage	54.17%	45.83%
County results
Hancock
50–60%
60–70%
70–80%
80–90%
90–100%
Garfield
50–60%
60–70%
70–80%
President before election
Rutherford B. Hayes
Republican
Elected President
James Garfield
Republican

The 1880 United States presidential election in Florida took place on November 2, 1880, as part of the 1880 United States presidential election. State voters chose four representatives, or electors, to the Electoral College, who voted for president and vice president.

Florida was won by General Winfield Scott Hancock (D–Pennsylvania), running with former Representative William Hayden English, with 54.17% of the popular vote, against Representative James Garfield (R-Ohio), running with the 10th chairman of the New York State Republican Executive Committee Chester A. Arthur, with 41.05% of the vote.

== Results ==
1880 United States presidential election in Florida
Party	Candidate	Running mate	Popular vote		Electoral vote	
Party	Candidate	Running mate	Count	%	Count	%
Democratic	Winfield Scott Hancock of Pennsylvania	William Hayden English of Indiana	27,964	54.17%	4	100.00%
Republican	James A. Garfield of Ohio	Chester A. Arthur of New York	23,654	45.83%	0	0.00%
Total			51,618	100.00%	4	100.00%

== See also ==
- United States presidential elections in Florida
- 1880 United States House of Representatives elections in Florida
- 1880 Florida gubernatorial election
