= William D. Bloxham Plantation =

Coordinates: 30.4344°N 84.3066°W

The William D. Bloxham Plantation was a small cotton-growing slave plantation of 1,400 acres (5.7 km^{2}) located southwest of Tallahassee, Leon County, Florida, United States, established by William D. Bloxham.

== Plantation specifics ==
The Leon County Florida 1860 Agricultural Census shows that the William D. Bloxam Plantation had the following:

- Improved Land: 600 acres (2.4 km^{2})
- Unimproved Land: 800 acres (3.2 km^{2})
- Cash value of plantation: $7000
- Cash value of farm implements/machinery: $765
- Cash value of farm animals: $1500
- Number of slaves: 52
- Bushels of corn: 2500
- Bales of cotton: 100

== The owner ==
- William Bloxham was born July 9, 1835, in Florida and was listed as 24 years old in 1860. Bloxham served as Florida's governor from 1881 through 1885. He again served as governor from 1897 through 1901. Bloxham died March 15, 1911.
- In 1884 William D. Bloxam plantation was sold to Charles J. F. Allen of Louisville, KY for $8241.

== Reconstruction ==
William D. Bloxham was one of the first, if not the first, to abandon cotton in 1879 in favor of intensive farming. Bloxham had $2275 (~$64,732 in 2024) worth of livestock in 1879.
