= 1880 United States House of Representatives elections in Florida =

United States House of Representatives elections in Florida, 1880
- November 2, 1880

Both of Florida's seats to the United States House of Representatives
	Majority party	Minority party
Party	Democratic	Republican
Last election	2	0
Seats won	2	0
Seat change	Steady	Steady
Popular vote	28,076	23,035
Percentage	54.8%	45.0%

The 1880 United States House of Representatives elections in Florida were held November 2 for the 47th Congress. These elections were held at the same time as the presidential election and the election for governor.

== Background ==
The Democrats had gained complete control of Florida's congressional delegation in 1878, although the results of the election in the 2nd district were successfully challenged, so that a single Republican represented Florida in the House for the last two months of the 46th Congress.

== Election results ==
Incumbent Noble A. Hull (D) of the 2nd district did not run for re-election.

1880 United States House election results
District	Democratic			Republican		
1st	Robert H. M. Davidson (I)	14,971	57.46%	George W. Witherspoon	11,082	42.54%
2nd	Jesse J. Finley	13,105	52.30%	Horatio Bisbee, Jr.	11,953	47.70%

== 1st District ==
United States House of Representatives election in Florida 1st congressional district, 1880
- November 2, 1880
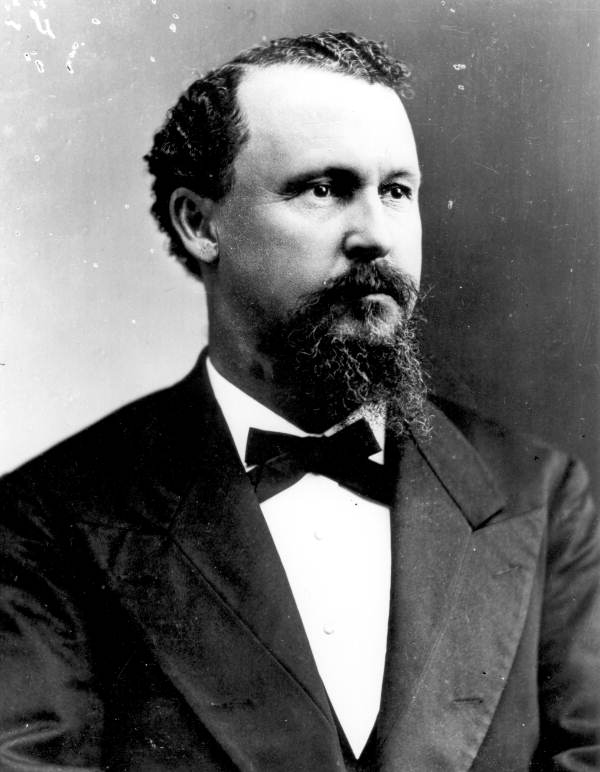

Nominee	Robert H. M. Davidson	George W. Witherspoon
Party	Democratic	Republican
Popular vote	14,971	11,082
Percentage	57.46%	42.54%
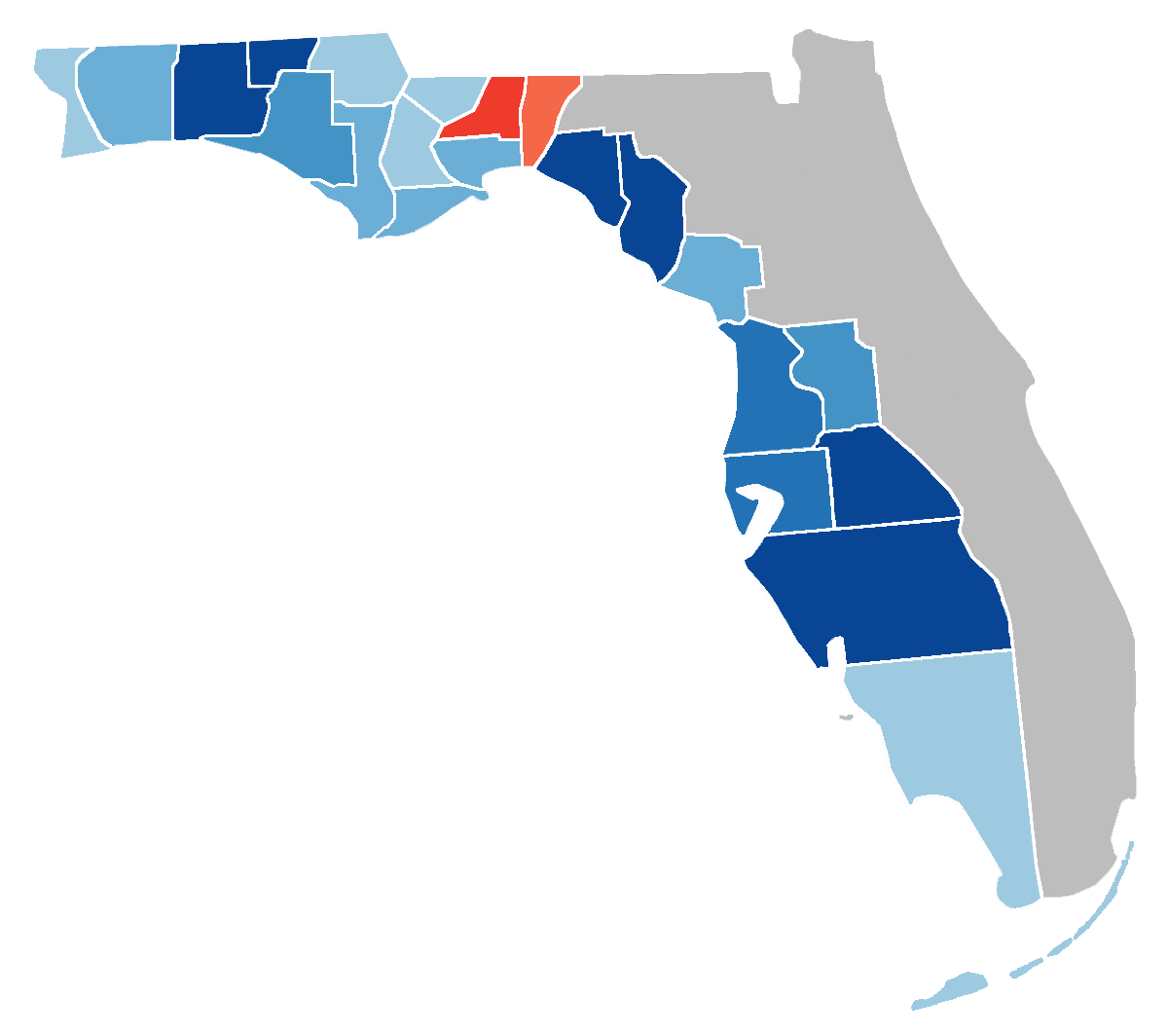
County Results
Davidson
50–59%
60–69%
70–79%
80–89%
90–100%
Witherspoon
60–69%
70–79%

Incumbent Robert H.M. Davidson easily defeated Republican nominee George W. Witherspoon with 57.46% of the votes.

In some tabulation from the 2nd precinct in Leon County, 127 votes for Robert H.M. Davidson were erroneously reported for Livingston W. Bethel.

1880 United States House election 1st District results
Democratic			Republican		
Robert H. M. Davidson (I)	14,971	57.46%	George W. Witherspoon	11,082	42.54%

=== Results ===
County	George W. Witherspoon Republican		Robert H. M. Davidson Democratic		Total votes
County	#	%	#	%	Total votes
Calhoun	89	30.38%	204	69.62%	293
Escambia	1,298	46.99%	1,464	53.01%	2,762
Franklin	121	36.78%	208	63.22%	329
Gadsden	1,066	46.39%	1,232	53.61%	2,298
Hernando	155	18.90%	665	81.10%	820
Hillsborough	199	17.36%	947	82.64%	1,146
Holmes	3	0.88%	339	99.12%	342
Jackson	1,177	44.26%	1,482	55.74%	2,659
Jefferson	1,596	66.56%	802	33.44%	2,398
Lafayette	29	7.46%	360	92.54%	389
Leon	2,839	76.58%	868	23.42%	3,707
Levy	458	36.41%	800	63.59%	1,258
Liberty	103	42.39%	140	57.61%	243
Manatee	59	8.65%	623	91.35%	682
Monroe	852	41.87%	1,183	58.13%	2,035
Polk	7	1.35%	510	98.65%	517
Santa Rosa	393	36.83%	674	63.17%	1,067
Sumter	242	25.80%	696	74.20%	938
Taylor	14	4.27%	314	95.73%	328
Wakulla	176	31.60%	381	68.40%	557
Walton	70	9.64%	656	90.36%	726
Washington	136	24.33%	423	75.46%	559
Totals	11,082	42.54%	14,971	57.46%	26,053

== 2nd District ==
United States House of Representatives election in Florida 2nd congressional district, 1880
- November 2, 1880
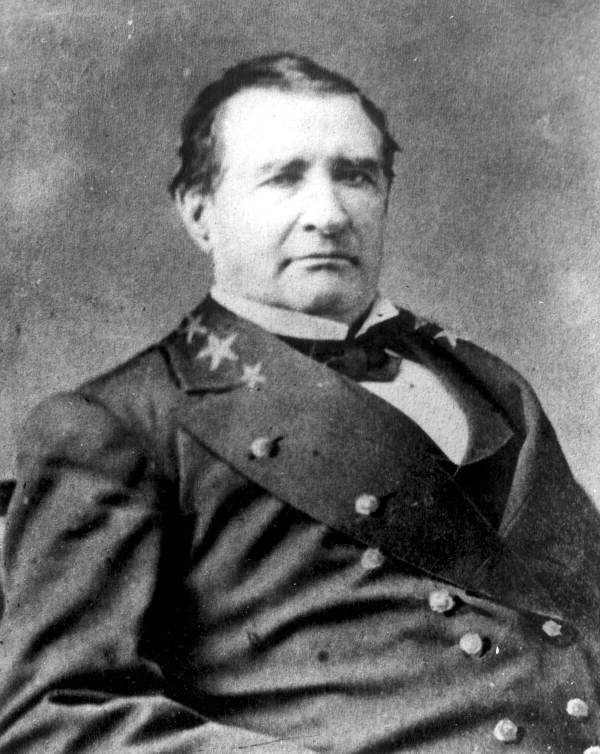

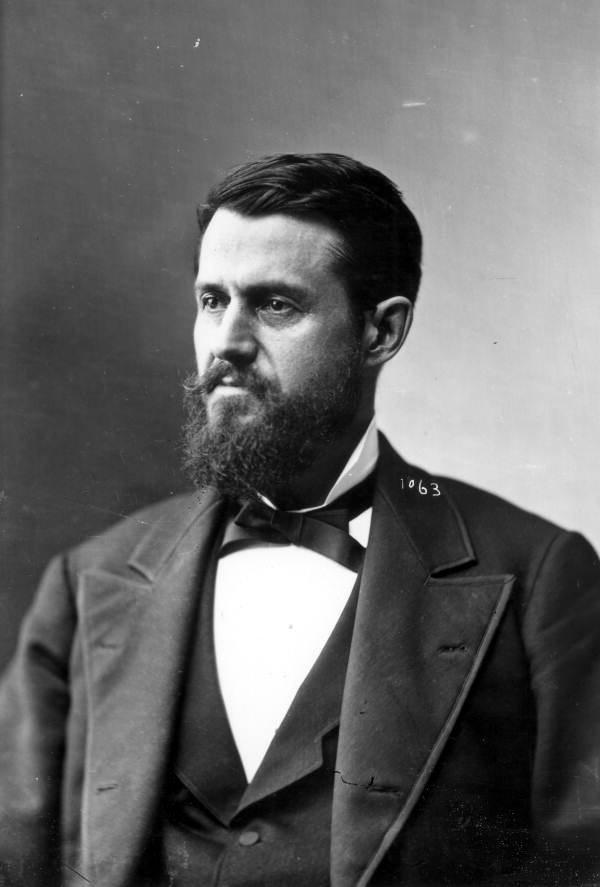
Nominee	Jesse J. Finley	Horatio Bisbee, Jr.
Party	Democratic	Republican
Popular vote	13,105	11,953
Percentage	52.30%	47.70%
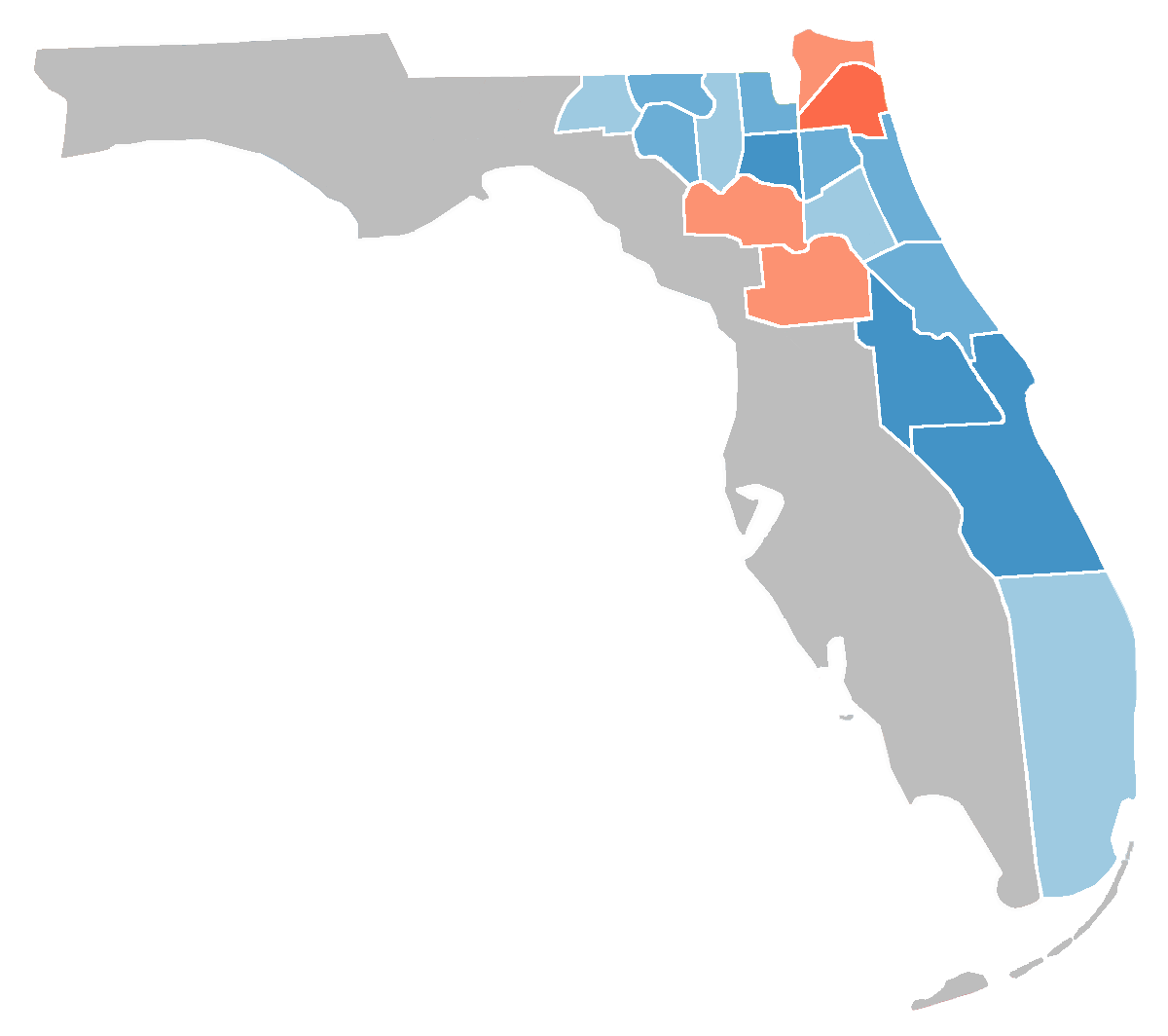
County Results
Finley
50–59%
60–69%
70–79%
Bisbee
50–59%
60–69%

1880 United States House election 2nd District results
Democratic			Republican		
Jesse J. Finley	13,105	52.30%	Horatio Bisbee, Jr.	11,953	47.70%

=== Results ===
County	Horatio Bisbee, Jr. Republican		Jesse J. Finley Democratic		Total votes
County	#	%	#	%	Total votes
Alachua	1,688	52.42%	1,532	47.58%	3,220
Baker	132	25.39%	241	64.61%	373
Bradford	291	23.76%	934	76.24%	1,225
Brevard	74	25.0%	222	75.0%	296
Clay	194	34.77%	364	65.23%	558
Columbia	815	44.51%	1,016	55.49%	1,831
Dade	23	41.82%	32	55.49%	55
Duval	2,584	62.69%	1,538	37.31%	4,122
Hamilton	450	37.47%	751	62.53%	1,201
Madison	1,014	49.01%	1,055	50.99%	2,069
Marion	1,535	59.04%	1,065	40.96%	2,600
Nassau	859	58.24%	616	41.76%	1,475
Orange	374	25.79%	1,076	74.21%	1,450
Putnam	741	49.47%	757	50.53%	1,498
St. Johns	354	36.88%	606	63.13%	960
Suwannee	514	39.24%	796	60.76%	1,310
Volusia	311	38.16%	504	61.84%	815
Totals	11,953	47.70%	13,105	52.30%	25,058

== Contested election ==
For the fourth time in a row, the election in the 2nd district was contested. Republican Horatio Bisbee, Jr. successfully contested the election of Democrat Jesse J. Finley and was seated June 1, 1882. Bisbee had also been on the winning side of an electoral dispute after the 1878 election, and on the losing side of an electoral dispute in 1876, while Finley had been on the winning side of electoral disputes in 1874 and 1876.

== See also ==
- 1880 United States presidential election in Florida
- United States House of Representatives elections, 1880
- 1880 Florida gubernatorial election
