= 1880 Illinois gubernatorial election =

- November 2, 1880
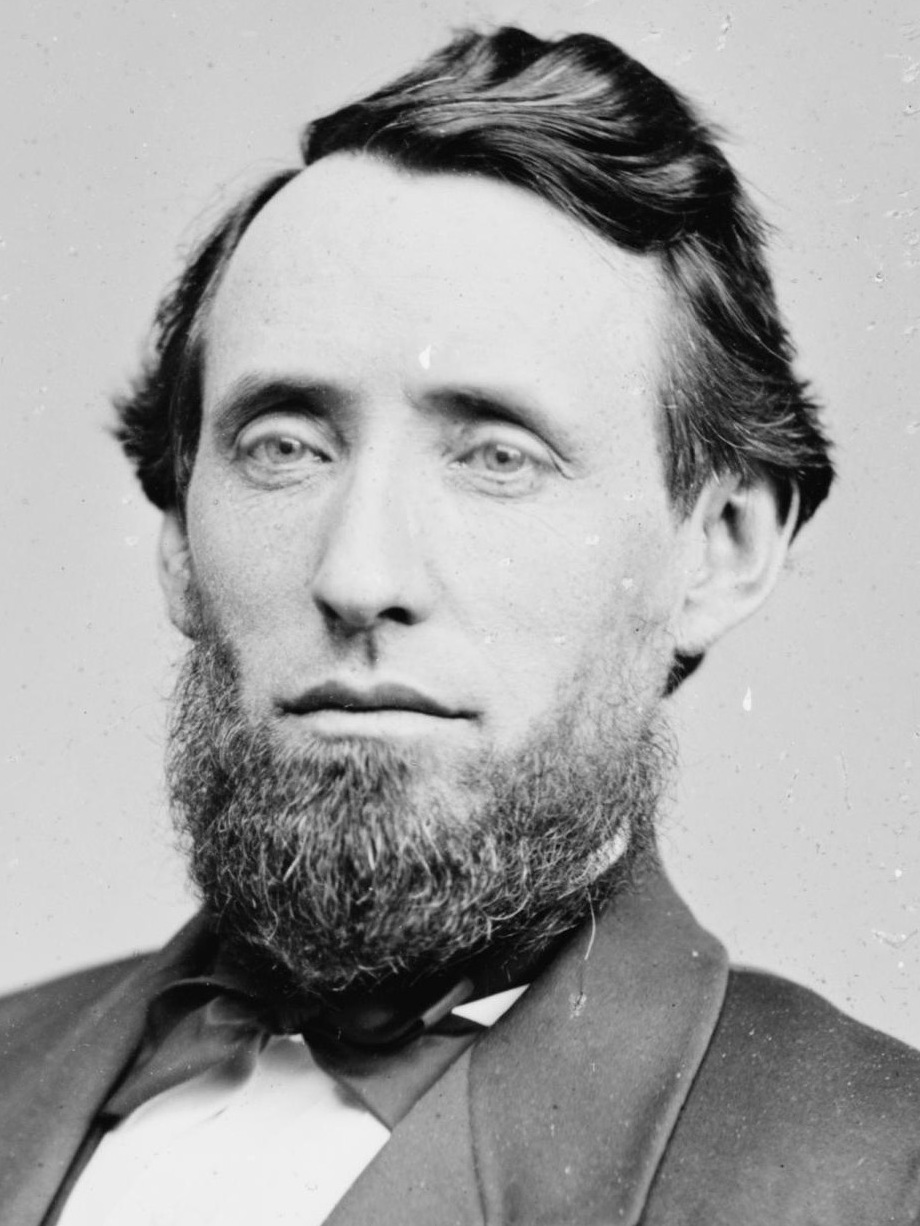

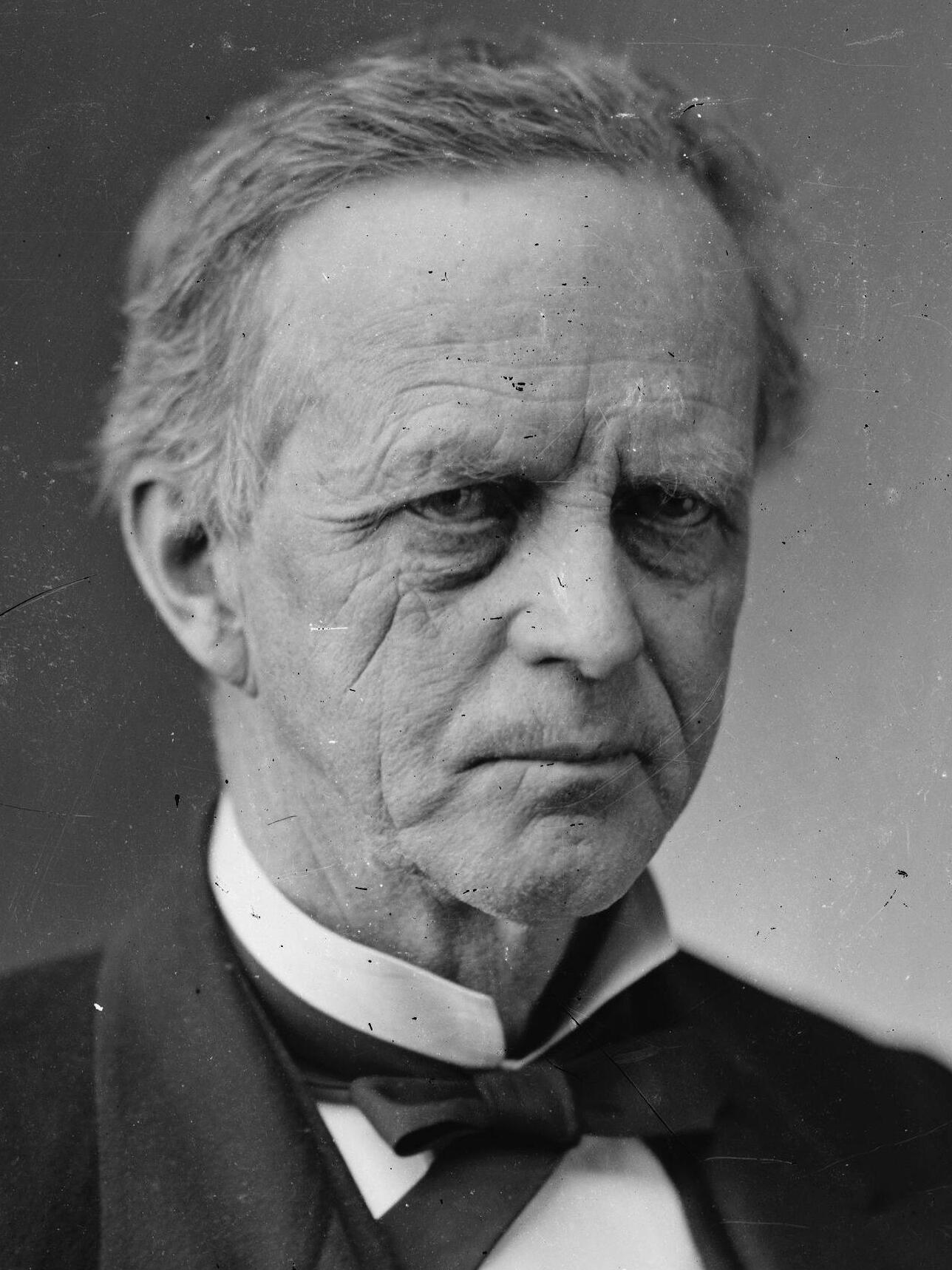
Nominee	Shelby Moore Cullom	Lyman Trumbull
Party	Republican	Democratic
Popular vote	314,565	277,532
Percentage	50.56%	44.61%
- County results Cullom: 40–50% 50–60% 60–70% 70–80% 80–90% Trumbull: 40–50% 50–60% 60–70%
Governor before election
Shelby Moore Cullom
Republican
Elected Governor
Shelby Moore Cullom
Republican

The 1880 Illinois gubernatorial election was held on November 2, 1880. Republican incumbent Shelby Moore Cullom defeated Democratic nominee Lyman Trumbull. This was the victory was the seventh consecutive victory for the Republican Party since 1856. This was the first election for governor to feature a candidate on the Greenback Party or Socialist Labor Party ticket.

== General election ==
=== Candidates ===
- Lyman Trumbull, former U.S. senator (Democratic)
- Shelby Moore Cullom, incumbent governor since 1877 (Republican)
- Uriah Copp Jr. (Prohibition)
- Erick Johnson (Socialist Labor)
- S. R. Pratt
- Alson Streeter, former state representative and nominee for U.S. representative in 1878 (Greenback)

=== Results ===
Illinois gubernatorial election, 1880 (Note: Some sources attribute 1,856 votes to a candidate called Belchadsky. This appears to be J. B. Belohradsky, who won 1,856 votes running for Lieutenant Governor.)
Party	Candidate	Votes	%	±%
Republican	Shelby M. Cullom (incumbent)	314,565	50.56%	
Democratic	Lyman Trumbull	277,532	44.61%	
Greenback	Alson Streeter	28,898	4.65%	
Socialist Labor	Erick Johnson	780	0.13%	
	S. R. Pratt	173	0.03%	
Prohibition	Uriah Copp Jr.	122	0.02%	
Majority		37,033	5.95%	
Turnout		622,070		
Republican hold		Swing		

== See also ==
- 1880 Illinois lieutenant gubernatorial election

== Bibliography ==
- Glashan, Roy R. (1979). American Governors and Gubernatorial Elections, 1775-1978. Meckler Books. ISBN 0-930466-17-9.
