= 1880 Illinois lieutenant gubernatorial election =

- November 2, 1880
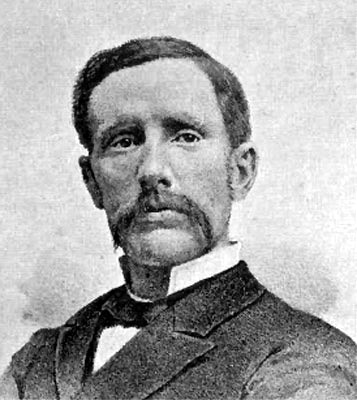

Nominee	John Marshall Hamilton	Lewis Baldwin Parsons
Party	Republican	Democratic
Popular vote	317,160	275,966
Percentage	51.16%	44.52%
Lieutenant Governor before election
Andrew Shuman
Republican
Elected Lieutenant Governor
John Marshall Hamilton
Republican

The 1880 Illinois lieutenant gubernatorial election was held on November 2, 1880, in order to elect the lieutenant governor of Illinois. Republican nominee John Marshall Hamilton defeated Democratic nominee and incumbent member of the Illinois Senate Lewis Baldwin Parsons and Greenback nominee Andrew Blainey Adair.

== General election ==
On election day, November 2, 1880, Republican nominee John Marshall Hamilton won the election by a margin of 41,194 votes against his foremost opponent Democratic nominee Lewis Baldwin Parsons, thereby retaining Republican control over the office of lieutenant governor. Hamilton was sworn in as the 21st lieutenant governor of Illinois on January 3, 1881.

=== Results ===
Illinois lieutenant gubernatorial election, 1880
Party	Candidate	Votes	%
Republican	John Marshall Hamilton	317,160	51.16
Democratic	Lewis Baldwin Parsons	275,966	44.52
Greenback	Andrew Blainey Adair	26,774	4.32
Total votes		619,900	100.00
Republican hold			

== See also ==
- 1880 Illinois gubernatorial election
