= 1880 Missouri lieutenant gubernatorial election =

- November 2, 1880
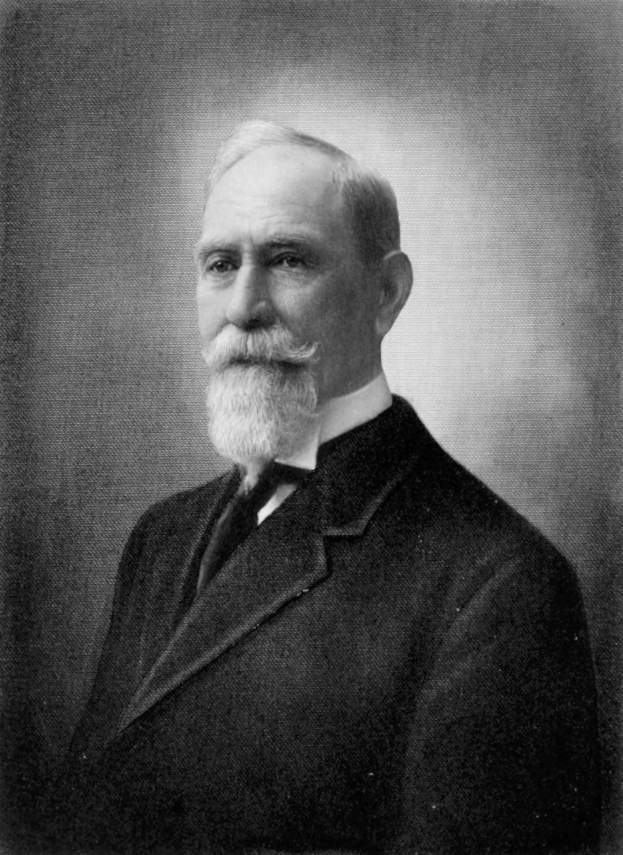

Nominee	Robert Alexander Campbell	Milo Blair	H. F. Fellows
Party	Democratic	Republican	Greenback
Popular vote	207,670	153,827	35,305
Percentage	52.34%	38.77%	8.89%
Lieutenant Governor before election
Henry Clay Brockmeyer
Democratic
Elected Lieutenant Governor
Robert Alexander Campbell
Democratic

The 1880 Missouri lieutenant gubernatorial election was held on November 2, 1880, in order to elect the lieutenant governor of Missouri. Democratic nominee Robert Alexander Campbell defeated Republican nominee Milo Blair and Greenback nominee H. F. Fellows.

== General election ==
On election day, November 2, 1880, Democratic nominee Robert Alexander Campbell won the election by a margin of 53,843 votes against his foremost opponent Republican nominee Milo Blair, thereby retaining Democratic control over the office of lieutenant governor. Campbell was sworn in as the 19th lieutenant governor of Missouri on January 10, 1881.

=== Results ===
Missouri lieutenant gubernatorial election, 1880
Party	Candidate	Votes	%
Democratic	Robert Alexander Campbell	207,670	52.34
Republican	Milo Blair	153,827	38.77
Greenback	H. F. Fellows	35,305	8.89
Total votes		396,802	100.00
Democratic hold			

== See also ==
- 1880 Missouri gubernatorial election
