= 1880 Florida gubernatorial election =

- November 2, 1880
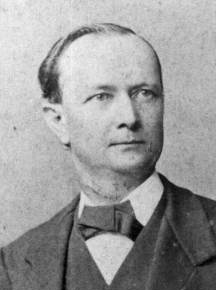

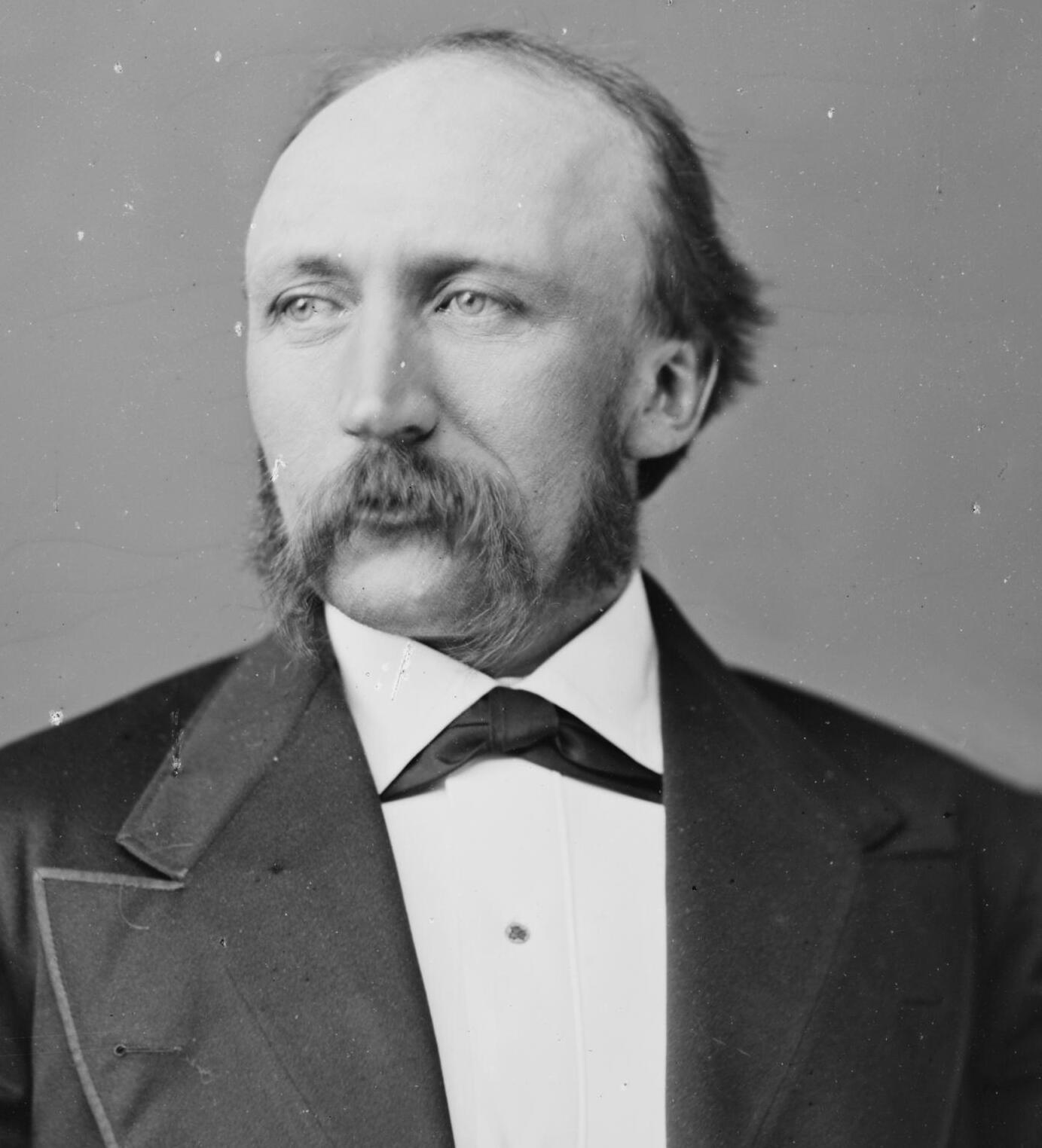
Nominee	William D. Bloxham	Simon B. Conover
Party	Democratic	Republican
Popular vote	28,372	23,307
Percentage	54.90%	45.10%

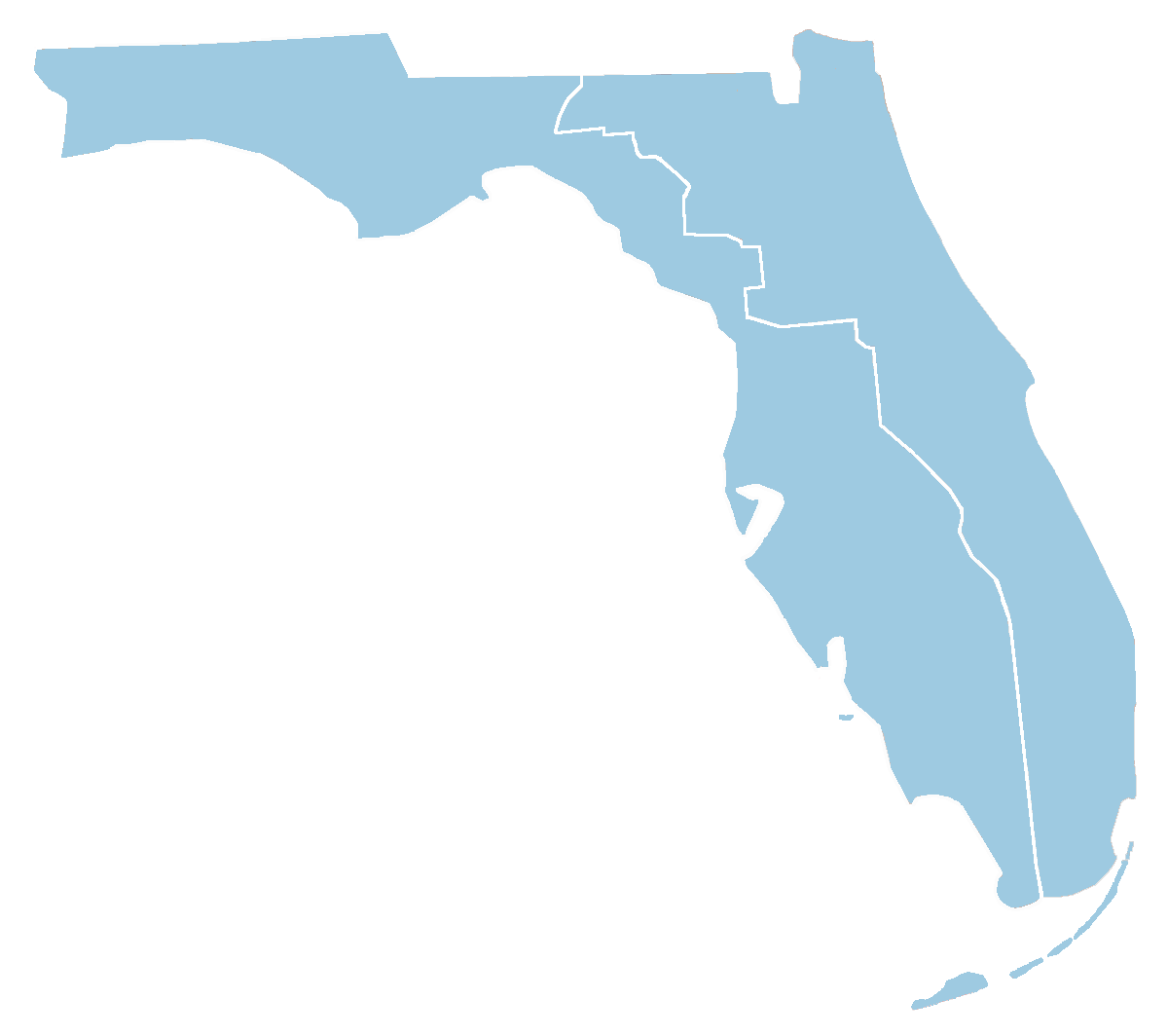
Bloxham
50–60%
60–70%
70–80%
80–90%
90–100%
Conover
50–60%
60–70%
70–80%
Governor before election
George Franklin Drew
Democratic
Elected Governor
William D. Bloxham
Democratic

The 1880 Florida gubernatorial election was held on November 2, 1880. Democratic nominee William D. Bloxham easily defeated Republican nominee Simon B. Conover with 54.90% of the vote.

== General election ==
=== Candidates ===
==== Democratic ====
- William D. Bloxham

==== Republican ====
- Simon B. Conover

=== Results ===
1880 Florida gubernatorial election
Party	Candidate	Votes	%	±%
Democratic	William D. Bloxham	28,372	54.90%	
Republican	Simon B. Conover	23,307	45.10%	

==== Results by county ====
County	William D. Bloxham Democratic		Simon B. Conover Republican		Total votes
County	#	%	#	%	Total votes
Alachua	1,554	46.35%	1,799	53.65%	3,353
Baker	242	64.71%	132	35.29%	374
Bradford	937	76.80%	283	23.20%	1,220
Brevard	234	79.05%	62	20.95%	296
Calhoun	202	69.42%	89	30.58%	291
Clay	364	65.35%	193	34.65%	557
Columbia	1,014	55.38%	817	44.62%	1,831
Dade	32	59.26%	22	40.74%	54
Duval	1,587	38.67%	2,517	61.33%	4,104
Escambia	1,466	53.08%	1,296	46.92%	2,762
Franklin	209	63.33%	121	36.67%	330
Gadsden	1,230	53.55%	1,067	46.45%	2,297
Hamilton	754	62.68%	449	37.32%	1,203
Hernando	663	80.56%	160	19.44%	823
Hillsborough	960	83.26%	193	16.74%	1,153
Holmes	344	99.14%	3	0.86%	347
Jackson	1,470	55.47%	1,180	44.53%	2,650
Jefferson	844	32.71%	1,736	67.29%	2,580
Lafayette	352	82.44%	75	17.56%	427
Leon	998	26.08%	2,829	73.92%	3,827
Levy	800	63.34%	463	36.66%	1,263
Liberty	137	54.58%	114	45.42%	251
Madison	1,053	50.99%	1,012	49.01%	2,065
Manatee	617	80.87%	146	19.13%	763
Marion	1,084	41.71%	1,515	58.29%	2,599
Monroe	1,184	58.12%	853	41.88%	2,037
Nassau	620	42.21%	849	57.79%	1,469
Orange	1,085	75.61%	350	24.39%	1,435
Polk	510	98.27%	9	1.73%	519
Putnam	766	51.83%	712	48.17%	1,478
Santa Rosa	675	62.50%	405	37.50%	1,080
St. Johns	619	64.35%	343	35.65%	962
Sumter	697	72.60%	263	27.40%	960
Suwannee	795	60.78%	513	39.22%	1,308
Taylor	313	84.59%	57	15.41%	370
Volusia	510	63.43%	294	36.57%	804
Wakulla	381	68.40%	176	31.60%	557
Walton	647	89.99%	72	10.01%	719
Washington	423	75.40%	138	24.60%	561
Totals	28,372	54.90%	23,307	45.10%	51,679

Counties that flipped from Republican to Democratic

- Dade
- Escambia
- Gadsden
- Madison

== See also ==
- 1880 United States presidential election in Florida
- 1880 United States House of Representatives elections in Florida
