= William Lyne Crawford =

American politician (1839–1920)

- Born: January 23, 1839; Clay County, Kentucky, U.S.
- Died: February 17, 1920 (aged 81); Dallas, Texas, U.S.
- Education: McKenzie College
- Occupations: Lawyer, politician
- Military career
- Allegiance: Confederate States of America (1861–1865)
- Branch: Confederate States Army
- Service years: 1861–1865
- Rank: Lt Colonel (CSA)
- Unit: 19th Texas Infantry

William Lyne Crawford (January 23, 1839 – February 17, 1920) was an American Confederate veteran, criminal lawyer and politician. He was "considered the leading criminal lawyer in Texas."

== Biography ==
William Crawford was born to Jeptha and Catherine Crawford in Clay County, Kentucky. The family moved to Texas in 1843.

During the American Civil War of 1861–1865, he served as a colonel in the Confederate States Army.

As a member of the Constitutional Convention of Texas held in 1875, Crawford succeeded in having a clause inserted in the constitution providing for the popular election of all judges. Years later he stated that it was a great mistake; that they should have been appointed.

He served as a Democratic member of the Texas House of Representatives from 1892 to 1893.
