= Henry L. Mitchell =

American judge (1831–1903)

Henry Laurens Mitchell
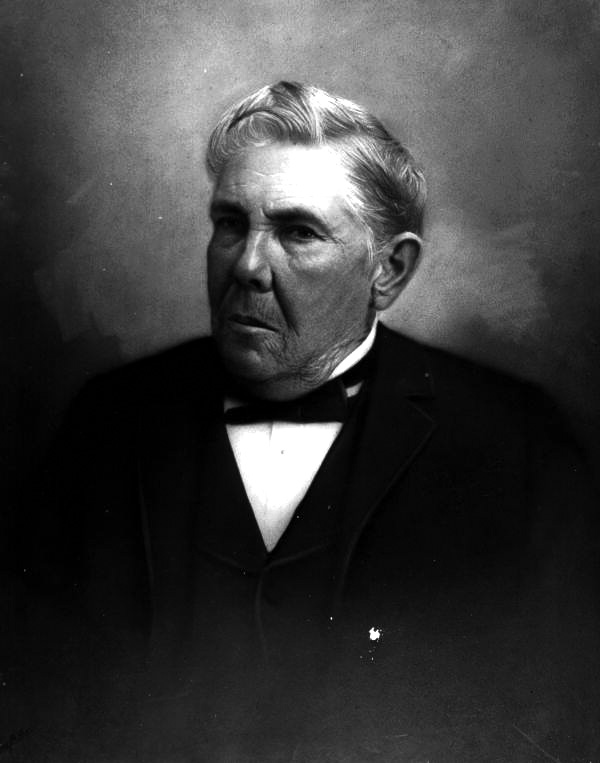

Treasurer of Hillsborough County
- In office January 1, 1903 – October 14, 1903

Clerk of Court of Hillsborough County
- In office January 1897 – January 1, 1891
- Preceded by: Charles Wright
- Succeeded by: W.L. Hanks

16th Governor of Florida
- In office January 3, 1893 – January 5, 1897
- Preceded by: Francis P. Fleming
- Succeeded by: William D. Bloxham

Justice of the Supreme Court of Florida
- In office 1888–1891
- Preceded by: Robert B. Van Valkenburgh
- Succeeded by: R. Fenwick Taylor

Member of the Florida House of Representatives

Personal details
- Born: September 3, 1831 near Birmingham, Alabama
- Died: October 14, 1903 (aged 72) Tampa, Florida
- Party: Democratic
- Spouse: Mary Eugenia Spencer Mitchell

Henry Laurens Mitchell (September 3, 1831 – October 14, 1903) was an American lawyer, judge, and politician. He served as the 16th Governor of Florida (1893–1897).

== Biography ==
Mitchell was born near Birmingham in Jefferson County, Alabama. His family moved to Tampa when he was 15 years old. Mitchell studied law and was admitted to the bar in 1849 at the age of 18.

When the American Civil War began, Mitchell resigned from his post as State Attorney and enlisted in the Confederate States Army. Mitchell was such a strong supporter of Southern nationalism that he had two members of his Masonic lodge expelled for fighting in the Union Army. In July 1863, Mitchell left the Confederate Army to take a seat in the Florida House of Representatives, to which he had been elected while serving. He was reelected after the war, in 1873 and 1875. His brother Charles Mitchell later became the Florida Commissioner of Land and Immigration, the modern equivalent of the Commissioner of Agriculture.

In 1888, Mitchell was appointed to the Florida Supreme Court, serving as an associate justice until 1891, when he resigned to start campaigning for governor. He won the election. During his term as governor, Mitchell was paid $3500 per year.

After he left office, Mitchell returned to Hillsborough County, where he was elected as clerk of the circuit court and subsequently county treasurer there. He died in Tampa on October 14, 1903, and was buried at Oaklawn Cemetery.

In 1915, Henry Mitchell Elementary School opened and was named after him.

Party political offices
Preceded by Francis P. Fleming	Democratic nominee for Governor of Florida; 1892	Succeeded by William D. Bloxham
Political offices
Preceded by Francis P. Fleming	Governor of Florida; January 3, 1893 – January 5, 1897	Succeeded by William D. Bloxham
