= George Washington Witherspoon =

Florida state legislator (1845–1892)

Member of the Florida House of Representatives from the Jefferson County district
- In office 1875–1877; 1877–1879; 1879–1881; 1883–1885

Personal details
- Born: December 15, 1845 Sumter County, South Carolina, U.S.
- Died: January 2, 1892 (aged 46)
- Party: Republican

George Washington Witherspoon (December 15, 1845 – January 2, 1892) was a shoemaker, A.M.E. minister, and state legislator in Florida.

Witherspoon was born in the South Carolina's Sumter District. He represented Jefferson County in the Florida House of Representatives in 1875, 1877, 1879, and 1883. He was a Republican Party candidate for a seat in the U.S. Congress in 1880. He won the Republican Party nomination over Malachi Martin but lost the general election to a Democrat whose majority was attributed to fraud. He served as a councilman in Pensacola, Florida from 1885 to 1889.

== See also ==
- African American officeholders from the end of the Civil War until before 1900
