= 1880 Swiss constitutional referendum =

31 October 1880
- Federal decree regarding the submitted popular initiative application of 3 August 1880 for the revision of the Federal Constitution

Results
Choice	Votes	%
Yes	121,099	31.77%
No	260,126	68.23%
Valid votes	381,225	100.00%
Invalid or blank votes	0	0.00%
Total votes	381,225	100.00%

A constitutional referendum was held in Switzerland on 31 October 1880 aiming at a complete overhaul of the constitution. The constitutional amendments were rejected by 68.2% of voters and a majority of cantons.

== Background ==
In order to pass, any amendments to the constitution needed a double majority; a majority of the popular vote and majority of the cantons. The decision of each canton was based on the vote in that canton. Full cantons counted as one vote, whilst half cantons counted as half.

== Results ==
Choice	Popular vote		Cantons		
Choice	Votes	%	Full	Half	Total
For	121,099	31.8	4	1	4.5
Against	260,126	68.2	15	5	17.5
Blank votes	5,305	–	–	–	–
Invalid votes		–	–	–	–
Total	536,530	100	19	6	22
Registered voters/turnout	641,576		–	–	–
Source: Nohlen & Stöver
