= 1880 Connecticut lieutenant gubernatorial election =

- November 2, 1880
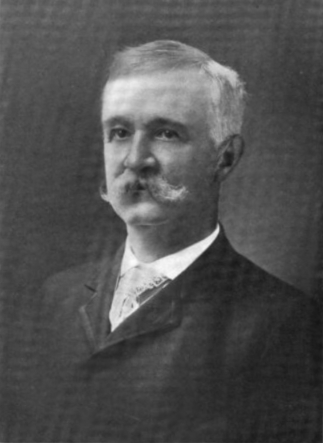

Nominee	William H. Bulkeley	Charles S. Pond
Party	Republican	Democratic
Popular vote	67,204	64,153
Percentage	50.60%	48.30%
Lieutenant Governor before election
David Gallup
Republican
Elected Lieutenant Governor
William H. Bulkeley
Republican

The 1880 Connecticut lieutenant gubernatorial election was held on November 2, 1880, to elect the lieutenant governor of Connecticut. Republican nominee William H. Bulkeley won the election against Democratic nominee Charles S. Pond, Greenback nominee Francis S. Sterling and Prohibition nominee Abel S. Beardsley.

== General election ==
On election day, November 2, 1880, Republican nominee William H. Bulkeley won the election with 50.60% of the vote, thereby retaining Republican control over the office of lieutenant governor. Bulkeley was sworn in as the 60th lieutenant governor of Connecticut on January 5, 1881.

=== Results ===
Connecticut lieutenant gubernatorial election, 1880
Party	Candidate	Votes	%
Republican	William H. Bulkeley	67,204	50.60
Democratic	Charles S. Pond	64,153	48.30
Greenback	Francis S. Sterling	894	0.70
Prohibition	Abel S. Beardsley	474	0.40
	Scattering	2	0.00
Total votes		132,727	100.00
Republican hold			
