= 1880 United Kingdom general election in Scotland =

- 31 March – 27 April 1880

All 60 Scottish seats to the House of Commons
- Turnout: 80.0%
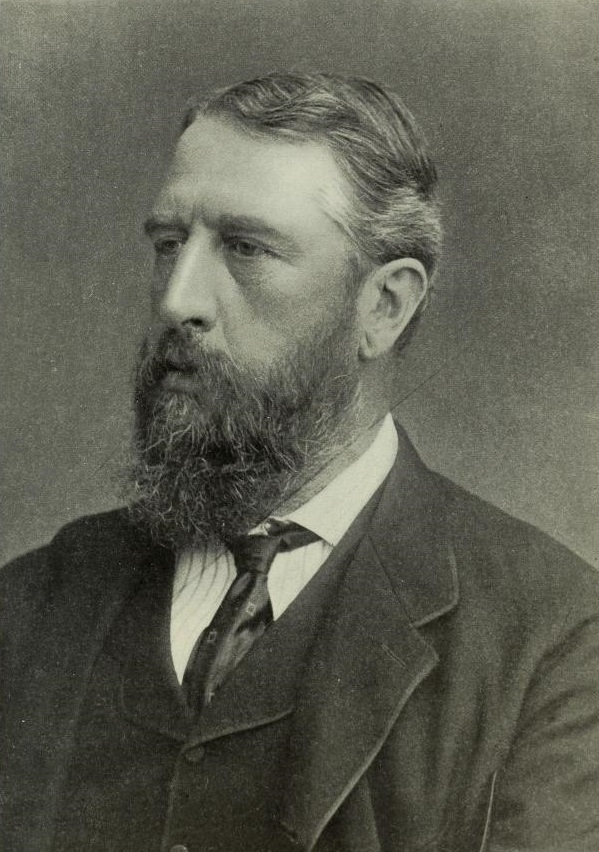

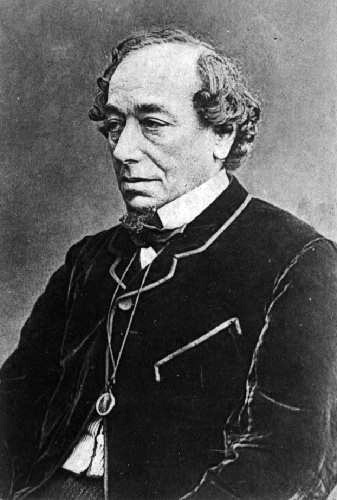
	First party	Second party
Leader	Marquess of Hartington	Earl of Beaconsfield
Party	Liberal	Conservative
Leader since	January 1875	27 February 1868
Leader's seat	North East Lancashire	House of Lords
Seats before	41 (Note: Combined results for burgh, county and university seats)	19
Seats won	53	7
Seat change	▲12	▼12
Popular vote	195,517 (Note: Total and percentage votes given here are for territorial constituencies only)	75,145
Percentage	70.1%	29.9%
Swing	▲1.7%	▼0.1%
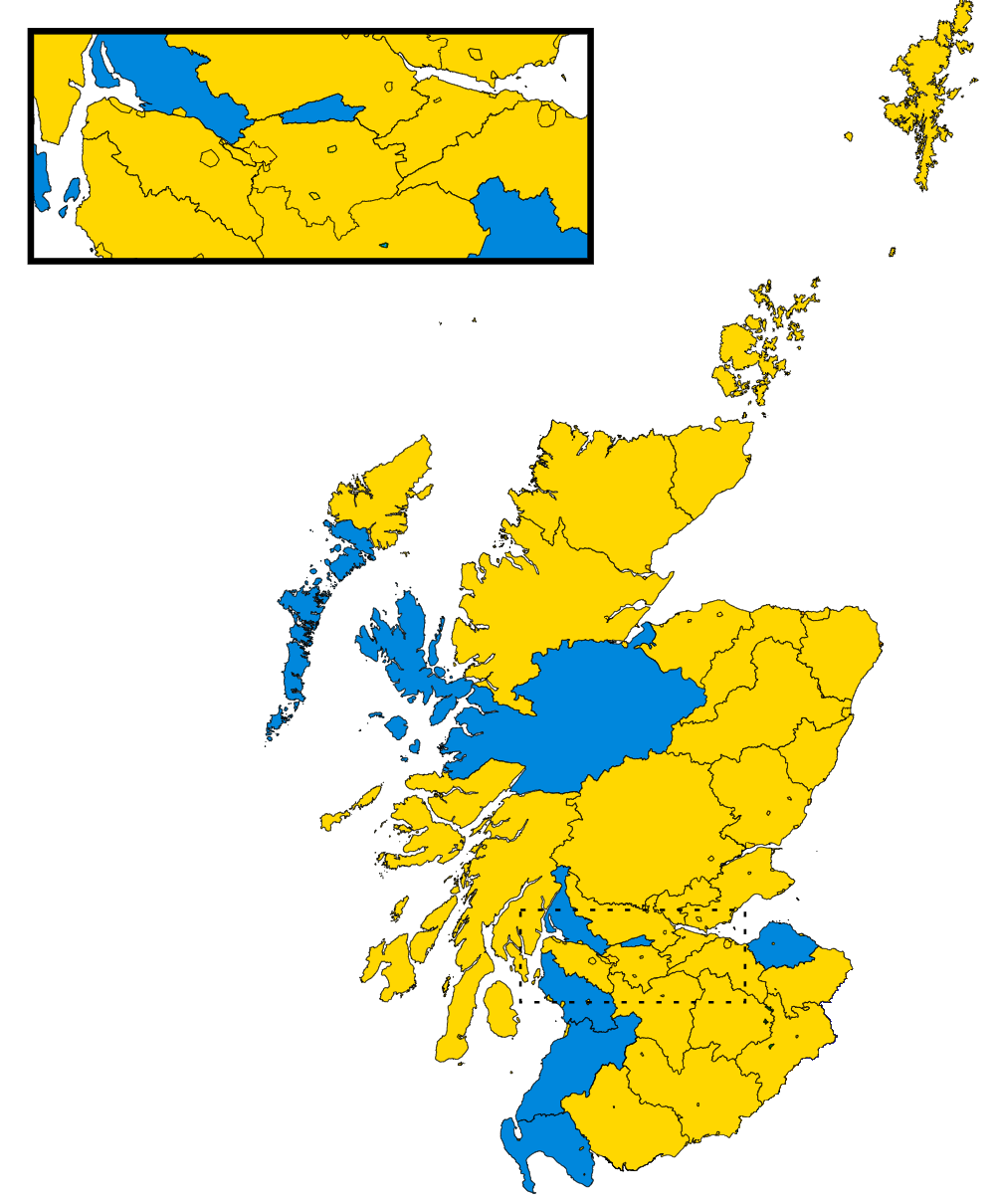

A general election was held in the United Kingdom between 31 March and 27 April 1880 and members were returned for all 60 seats in Scotland. Scotland was allocated 54 territorial seats, comprising 22 burgh constituencies and 32 county constituencies, (Note: Two burgh seats, Dundee and Edinburgh, were represented by two members of parliament, whilst Glasgow returned three members.) and two university constituencies, Glasgow and Aberdeen Universities and Edinburgh and St Andrews Universities. As voters in university constituencies voted in addition to their territorial vote, the results are compiled separately.

Of particular note was the Scottish-based Midlothian campaign of William Gladstone.

== Results ==
=== Seats Summary ===
Party	Seats	Last Election	Seats change
Liberal	53	41	▲12
Conservative	7	19	▼12
Total	72	60	▲12

=== Burgh & County constituencies ===
Party	Seats	Seats change	Votes	%	% Change
Liberal	52	▲12	195,517	70.1	▲1.7
Conservative	6	▼12	75,145	29.9	▼1.7
Total	60		269,662	100.0	
Turnout:				80.0	▲9.1

=== University constituencies ===
General election 1880: Edinburgh & St Andrews Universities
Party	Candidate	Votes	%	±%
Liberal	Lyon Playfair	2,522	50.7	N/A
Conservative	Edward Robert Bickersteth	2,448	49.3	New
Majority		74	1.4	N/A
Turnout		4,970	83.3	N/A
Registered electors		5,966		
Liberal hold		Swing		

General election 1880: Glasgow and Aberdeen Universities
Party	Candidate	Votes	%	±%
Conservative	James Alexander Campbell	unopposed	unopposed	N/A
Conservative hold				

=== Votes summary ===
Popular vote
Liberal	70.10%
Conservative	29.90%

Parliamentary seats
Liberal	88.33%
Conservative	11.67%

== See also ==
- History of Scotland § 19th century
