= Francis P. Fleming =

15th Governor of Florida from 1889 to 1893

Francis Philip Fleming
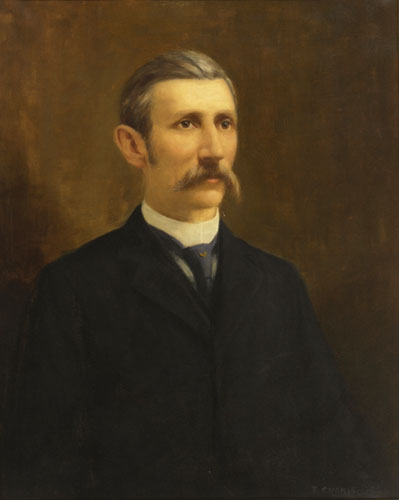

15th Governor of Florida
- In office January 8, 1889 – January 3, 1893
- Preceded by: Edward A. Perry
- Succeeded by: Henry L. Mitchell

Personal details
- Born: September 28, 1841 Panama Park, Florida (now Jacksonville), U.S
- Died: December 20, 1908 (aged 67) Jacksonville, Florida, U.S
- Party: Democratic
- Spouse: Floride Lydia Pearson

Military service
- Allegiance: Confederate States
- Branch/service: Confederate States Army
- Years of service: 1861–1865
- Rank: Captain
- Unit: 2nd Florida Infantry
- Battles/wars: American Civil War

Francis Philip Fleming (September 28, 1841 – December 20, 1908) was an American Democratic politician who served as the 15th governor of Florida from 1889 to 1893. A Confederate soldier and lawyer before Governor, Fleming's "racist record is undisputed".

== Biography ==
Fleming was born September 28, 1841, in Panama Park (now part of Jacksonville), Duval County, Florida. He spent his early years with his parents, Lewis Fleming and his second wife Margaret Seton, on their St. Johns River plantation, "Hibernia". The plantation narrowly escaped destruction at the hands of the Independent Battalion, Massachusetts Cavalry in mid-April 1864 when Colonel Guy V. Henry, a relative of the Fleming family, ordered it spared.

During the American Civil War, Fleming served the Confederate cause by enlisting as a private in the 2nd Florida Regiment and received a battlefield promotion to first lieutenant, and subsequently to the rank of captain. After being wounded, Fleming returned to Florida and actively enlisted new volunteers, commanding a volunteer company at the Battle of Natural Bridge at St. Marks on March 6, 1865. By the end of the war, Fleming had served under four generals: John Magruder, Joseph Johnston, John Bell Hood, and Robert E. Lee.

After the war, Francis Fleming studied law and was admitted to the bar in 1868, becoming a partner in the firm of Fleming and Daniel, later Fleming and Fleming. In 1871, he married Floride Lydia Pearson, the daughter of Florida Supreme Court justice Bird M. Pearson. Together the couple had three children: Francis Philip Jr., Elizabeth Fleming, and Charles Seton.

Francis P. Fleming authored a book memorializing his brother, titled The Florida Troops/A Memoir of Captain C. Seton Fleming C.S.A., originally published by Times-Union Publishing House, Jacksonville, Florida, 1884. Its preface includes: "The preparation of the following pages was not commenced with the design of publication; but for the purpose of collecting and preserving in manuscript form, a brief memoir of one, in whose life was combined all the elements of true nobility, with that daring heroism which characterized his service as a soldier, during the most eventful period of this country's history, which I felt might be read with profit and pleasure by kindred of another generation." Original copies are quite rare.

Fleming later entered politics, and became the fifteenth Governor of Florida on January 8, 1889, serving until January 3, 1893, the sole term provided by state law at that time. Notable events during Fleming's term include:

- The creation of a state Board of Health to stop a yellow fever epidemic that was sweeping the state;
- The repeal of the Florida Railroad Commission, at the urging of railroad baron Henry Flagler;
- The start of a reorganization of higher education institutions;
- Adjustment of state revenues;
- The Farmers' Alliance movement;
- The 1891 reelection dispute of Senator Wilkinson Call.

Fleming later advocated adding a red saltire or diagonal cross to the Florida flag, in order to distinguish it from a flag of surrender (the flag at that time was a white flag with the Florida seal in the center). This proposal was adopted in 1900 by a statewide whites-only referendum. Fleming also began the tradition of having an official portrait painted and hung in the Florida State Capitol.

After he left office, Fleming served on the board of trustees of the new Florida Old Confederate Soldiers and Sailors Home. On December 20, 1908, Fleming died following a long illness. He is buried at the Old City Cemetery in Jacksonville.

== Facts ==
Fleming was the son of Lewis Fleming (1798–1862) and his second wife, Margaret Seton. He was the great-grandson of Francis Philip Fatio, a Swiss-born planter in Florida in both the British and Spanish colonial periods.

Fleming Island, Florida (an un-incorporated community in between Orange Park and Green Cove Springs in Clay County, Florida, was part of the Fleming family's Spanish Land Grants. The area has since retained the name Fleming Island.

The former governor and his wife, Floride, are buried in The Old City Cemetery, Jacksonville, Florida.

University Athletic Field, the original football facility at the University of Florida (UF), was renamed "Fleming Field" after a 1915 renovation at the urging of the late governor's son, Francis P. Fleming Jr., who served on the university's Board of Control and was a UF alumnus. The venue was replaced by much larger Florida Field in 1930, but the grassy area to the north of the current stadium is still known as Fleming Field.

Party political offices
Preceded by Edward A. Perry	Democratic nominee for Governor of Florida; 1888	Succeeded by Henry L. Mitchell
Political offices
Preceded by Edward A. Perry	Governor of Florida; January 8, 1889 – January 3, 1893	Succeeded by Henry L. Mitchell
