= Tom Rossin =

American politician (born 1933)

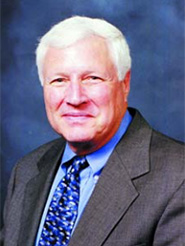

Minority Leader of the Florida Senate
- In office November 21, 2000 – November 5, 2002
- Preceded by: Buddy Dyer
- Succeeded by: Ron Klein

Member of the Florida Senate from the 35th district
- In office November 8, 1994 – November 5, 2002
- Preceded by: Mark Foley
- Succeeded by: Gwen Margolis

Personal details
- Born: August 29, 1933 (age 93) New York City, New York
- Party: Democratic
- Spouse: Joyce Thornton
- Children: 3
- Education: Columbia University (B.S.); University of Miami School of Law (J.D.)
- Occupation: Attorney, banker

Tom Rossin (born August 29, 1933) is a Democratic politician from Florida who served as a member of the Florida Senate from the 35th district from 1994 to 2002 and as Minority Leader of the Florida Senate from 2000 to 2002. In 2002, Rossin was the running mate of Bill McBride, the Democratic nominee for governor.

== Early life ==
Rossin was born in New York City in 1933, and attended Columbia University, graduating in 1958. He moved to Florida in 1957, and later attended the University of Miami School of Law, receiving his juris doctor in 1965.

== Florida Senate ==
In 1994, when Republican State Senator Mark Foley opted to run for Congress, Rossin ran to succeed him in the 35th district, which stretched from West Palm Beach to Fort Myers. He faced computer analyst Nick Rodriguez in the Democratic primary. Rossin won the primary by a wide margin, winning 77 percent of the vote to Rodriguez's 23 percent. In the general election, he faced David Bludworth, the former Fifteenth Judicial Circuit State Attorney, and the Republican nominee. Rossin narrowly defeated Bludworth, receiving 52 percent of the vote to Bludworth's 48 percent.

Rossin ran for a full term in 1996. He was challenged by perennial candidate Andy Martin, who became the Republican nominee by default when one candidate dropped out and another failed to appear on the ballot when his qualifying check bounced. The Republican Party of Florida disavowed Martin, who had allegedly filed paperwork in a previous congressional campaign stating that his intent was to "exterminate Jew power in America." Rossin won the general election in a landslide, receiving 73 percent of the vote.

In 2000, Rossin ran for a third term. He was challenged by Republican Dave Vaughan, a commercial real estate professional, and Reform Party nominee Sheree Lowe. Rossin won re-election by a wide margin, receiving 61 percent of the vote to Vaughan's 34 percent and Lowe's 5 percent.

Rossin was elected Minority Leader of the Senate at the 2000 organizational session, and served until 2002, when he was term-limited.

== 2002 lieutenant-gubernatorial campaign ==
In 2002, after Bill McBride was declared the winner of the Democratic primary for Governor, he picked Rossin as his running mate. They lost to Governor Jeb Bush by a wide margin, receiving 43 percent of the vote to his 56 percent.

Florida Senate
| Preceded by Buddy Dyer | Minority Leader of the Florida Senate; 1994–2002 | Succeeded by Ron Klein |
Party political offices
| Preceded by Rick Dantzler | Democratic nominee for Lieutenant Governor of Florida; 2002 | Succeeded by Daryl Jones |
