= 2006 Florida gubernatorial election =

- November 7, 2006
- Turnout: 46.8%▼8.5
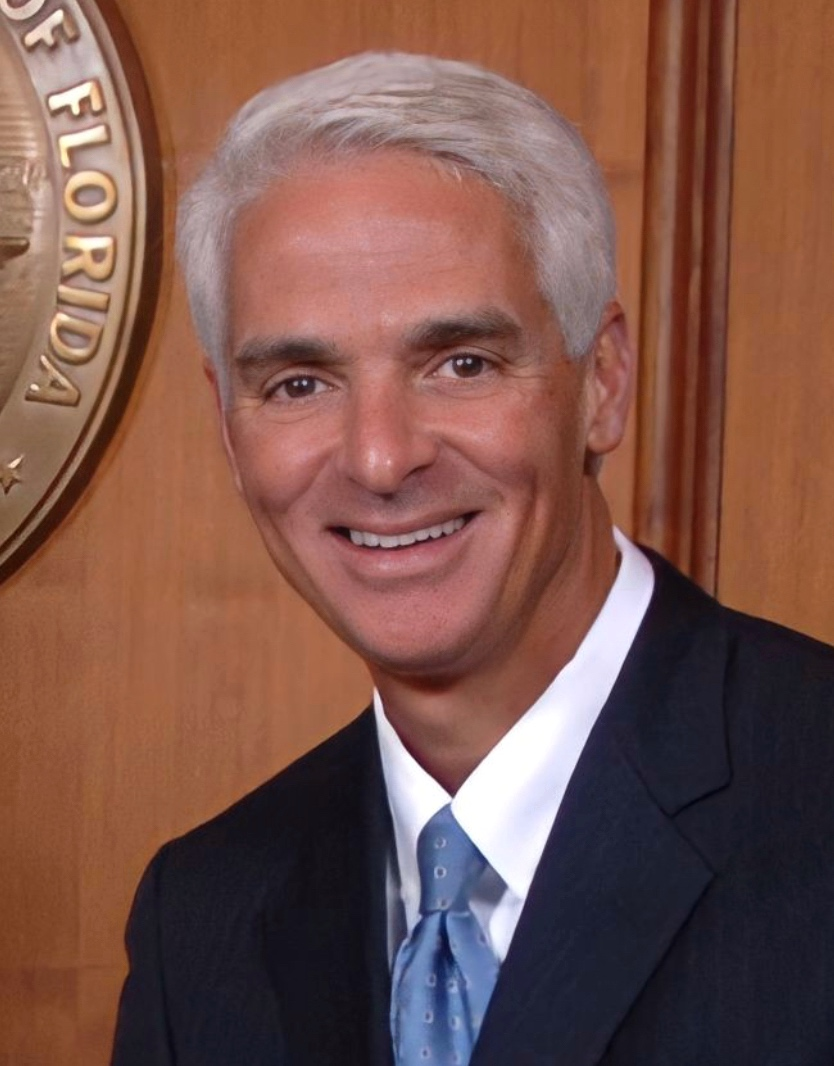

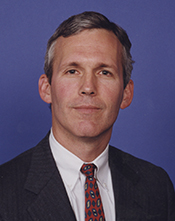
Nominee	Charlie Crist	Jim Davis
Party	Republican	Democratic
Running mate	Jeff Kottkamp	Daryl Jones
Popular vote	2,519,845	2,178,289
Percentage	52.20%	45.10%
- Crist: 40–50% 50–60% 60–70% 70–80% Davis: 40–50% 50–60% 60–70% 70–80% 80–90%
Governor before election
Jeb Bush
Republican
Elected Governor
Charlie Crist
Republican

The 2006 Florida gubernatorial election took place on November 7, 2006. Incumbent Republican Governor Jeb Bush was term-limited, and could not run for election to a third consecutive term. The election was won by then-Republican Charlie Crist, the state's attorney general. The election was notable in that for the first time, the state elected a Republican governor in three consecutive elections.

Turnout for the 2006 election was down 8.5% from 2002 and down 2.7% from 1998. With Republicans holding the seat, the state's governorship avoided being part of the wave in which Democrats netted a gain of six governorships across the nation. This remains the last time that Charlie Crist won a statewide election in Florida, as well as the last election in which he ran as a Republican. This was the last time until 2022 that anyone was elected governor with a majority of the vote. To date, this is the last time Florida simultaneously elected a United States Senate candidate and a gubernatorial candidate of different political parties.

== Democratic primary ==
=== Campaign ===
Jim Davis won the Democratic primary on September 5. Davis was the congressman from Florida's 11th congressional district and served in the Florida House of Representatives, where he also served as the majority leader. On September 13, Davis selected former state senator and 2002 gubernatorial candidate Daryl Jones of Miami as his running mate.

The Democratic primary turned heated as it approached primary day. Rod Smith attacked Jim Davis for a 1990 legislative vote denying restitution for two black men wrongfully imprisoned for murder. Davis countered that Smith was a "pawn" of the sugar industry, and that "big business" and special interests were funding many of Smith's attack ads.

=== Candidates ===
==== Declared ====
- Glenn Burkett
- Carol Castagnero, retired teacher
- John M. Crotty
- Jim Davis, U.S. representative from Tampa
- Rod Smith, state senator from Gainesville

==== Withdrew ====
- Bud Chiles, son of former governor Lawton Chiles
- Scott Maddox, former mayor of Tallahassee and former chairman of the Florida Democratic Party

==== Declined ====
- Betty Castor, former Education Commissioner of Florida, former president of the University of South Florida, 2004 Democratic nominee for the U.S. Senate

=== Endorsements ===
Jim Davis

U.S. senators

- Max Cleland, former U.S. senator from Georgia
- Bob Graham, former governor of Florida and former U.S. senator from Florida

U.S. representatives

- Alcee Hastings, U.S. representative (FL-23)
- Pete Peterson, former U.S. representative, former United States Ambassador to Vietnam
- Debbie Wasserman Schultz, U.S. representative (FL-20)
- Robert Wexler, U.S. representative (FL-19)

Statewide officials

- Buddy MacKay, former governor of Florida

Mayors and other municipal leaders

- Frank Bruno, Volusia County Council chairman
- Steve Feren, mayor of Sunrise
- Ilene Lieberman, Broward County commissioner
- Scott Maddox, former mayor of Tallahassee
- Carl Persis, Volusia County councilman
- Diana Wasserman-Rubin, Broward County commissioner

Individuals

- Rhea Chiles, former First Lady of Florida

Newspapers

- Bradenton Herald
- Florida Times-Union
- Orlando Sentinel
- Tampa Tribune

Organizations

- Sierra Club
Rod Smith

Statewide officials

- Bob Butterworth, former attorney general of Florida
- Wayne Mixson, former governor of Florida

State legislators

- Dave Aronberg, state senator
- Skip Campbell, state senator
- Steven Geller, state senator
- Richard Machek, state representative
- Matt Meadows, state representative
- Nan Rich, state senator
- Jack Seiler, state representative
- Priscilla Taylor, state representative

Mayors and other municipal leaders

- Sharon Bock, Palm Beach clerk of court and comptroller
- Howard Finkelstein, Broward County public defender
- Howard Forman, Broward County clerk of the court
- Addie Greene, Palm Beach County commissioner
- Ron Greenstein, state representative
- Carey Haughwout, Palm Beach County public defender
- Barry Krischer, Palm Beach County state attorney
- Ed Oppel, Port of Palm Beach commissioner
- Ari Porth, state representative
- Tom Rossin, former state senator and 2002 Democratic nominee for lieutenant governor
- Tim M. Ryan, state representative
- Mike Satz, Broward County state attorney
- David Turner, Gilchrist County sheriff
- Lois Wexler, Broward County commissioner

Individuals

- Bud Chiles, son of former governor Lawton Chiles

Newspapers

- The Daytona Beach News-Journal
- The Gainesville Sun
- The Ledger
- Naples Daily News
- The Palm Beach Post
- St. Petersburg Times
- Sun-Sentinel

County results

Democratic primary results
Party	Candidate	Votes	%
Democratic	Jim Davis	405,879	47.32%
Democratic	Rod Smith	353,161	41.17%
Democratic	Carol Castagnero	45,161	5.267%
Democratic	Glenn Burkett	32,984	3.85%
Democratic	John M. Crotty	20,629	2.40%
Total votes		857,814	100.00%

== Republican primary ==
Charlie Crist, the Republican candidate, won the primary on September 5 with 64% of the vote. Crist was Florida's attorney general at the time. Previously he was elected State Education Commissioner, and has served in the Florida Senate. He faced Bob Graham for his seat in the United States Senate in 1998. On September 13, 2006, Crist announced that State Representative Jeff Kottkamp of Cape Coral would be his running mate.

The GOP primary did not end up being very competitive. Crist touted experience in statewide offices, and a strong fundraising capability. He portrayed himself as relatively moderate on social issues, which created some misgivings among conservative Republicans in the state, but not nearly enough to sway the vote to Tom Gallagher.

=== Candidates ===
==== Declared ====
- Charlie Crist, attorney general of Florida, and nominee for U.S. Senate in 1998
- Tom Gallagher, chief financial officer of Florida, former State Treasurer-Insurance Commissioner, former Education Commissioner, and candidate for governor in 1986 and 1994
- Vernon Palmer
- Michael W. St. Jean, minister

==== Declined ====
- Toni Jennings, lieutenant governor of Florida

=== Endorsements ===
Charlie Crist

U.S. senators

- Connie Mack III, former U.S. senator from Florida
- Mel Martinez, U.S. senator from Florida
- John McCain, U.S. senator from Arizona

State legislators

- Allan Bense, speaker of the Florida House of Representatives
- Victor Crist, state senator
- Mike Fasano, state senator
- Jeff Kottkamp, state representative
- Joe Negron, state representative

Mayors and other municipal leaders

- Bill Balkwill, Sarasota County sheriff
- Kevin Beary, Orange County sheriff
- Susan Benton, Highlands County sheriff
- Rick Beseler, Clay County sheriff
- Jim Coats, Pinellas County sheriff
- Robert Crowder, Martin County sheriff
- Chris Daniels, Lake County sheriff
- John Davenport, Charlotte County sheriff
- Don Eslinger, Seminole County sheriff
- Bill Farmer, Sumter County sheriff
- Donald Fleming, Flagler County sheriff
- Heather Fiorentino, Pasco County superintendent of schools
- David Gee, Hillsborough County sheriff
- Wendell Hall, Santa Rosa County sheriff
- Ben Johnson, Volusia County sheriff
- Grady Judd, Polk County sheriff
- Ronnie Lee, Hendry County sheriff
- Jack Mariano, Pasco County commissioner
- Paul May, Okeechobee County sheriff
- Ron McNesby, Escambia County sheriff
- Charlie Morris, Okaloosa County sheriff
- Rich Nugent, Hernando County sheriff
- Steve Oelrich, Alachua County sheriff
- Jed Pittman, Pasco County clerk of the court
- Rick Roth, Monroe County sheriff
- John Rutherford, Duval County sheriff
- Mike Scott, Lee County sheriff
- Tommy Seagraves, Nassau County sheriff
- David Shoar, St. Johns County sheriff
- Steve Simon, Pasco County commissioner
- Doug Smith, Martin County commissioner
- Charlie Wells, Manatee County sheriff
- Mike Wells, Pasco County property appraiser
- Bob White, Pasco County sheriff

Newspapers

- The Daytona Beach News-Journal
- Florida Times-Union
- Orlando Sentinel
- The Palm Beach Post
- Sun-Sentinel
- St. Petersburg Times
- Tampa Tribune

Organizations

- Florida Fraternal Order of Police
- Florida Medical Political Action Committee
- Florida Police Benevolent Association
- NRA Political Victory Fund
- Sierra Club
Tom Gallagher

U.S. representatives

- Ileana Ros-Lehtinen (FL-18)

Statewide officials

- Bob Martinez, former governor of Florida
- James C. Smith, former attorney general of Florida, Florida secretary of state, and 1994 Republican candidate for governor

State legislators

- JD Alexander, state senator
- Dick Kravitz, state representative
- John E. Thrasher, former speaker of the Florida House of Representatives

Mayors and other municipal leaders

- Dottie Berger MacKinnon, former Hillsborough County commissioner
- Jack Parker, Brevard County sheriff
- Roy Raymond, Indian River County sheriff

Individuals

- James Dobson, founder of Focus on the Family

County results

Republican primary results
Party	Candidate	Votes	%
Republican	Charlie Crist	630,816	63.98%
Republican	Tom Gallagher	330,165	33.49%
Republican	Vernon Palmer	13,547	1.37%
Republican	Michael W. St. Jean	11,458	1.16%
Total votes		985,986	100.00%

== General election ==
=== Candidates ===
- Charlie Crist, Florida Attorney General (Republican nominee)
- Jim Davis, United States Representative from Florida's 11th congressional district (Democratic nominee)
- Max Linn, financial planner (Reform Party nominee)
- John Wayne Smith, perennial candidate (no party affiliation)
- Richard Paul Dembinsky, perennial candidate (no party affiliation)
- Karl C.C. Behm, paintball facility owner (no party affiliation)

=== Predictions ===
Source	Ranking	As of
The Cook Political Report	Lean R	November 6, 2006
Sabato's Crystal Ball	Lean R	November 6, 2006
Rothenberg Political Report	Likely R	November 2, 2006
Real Clear Politics	Lean R	November 6, 2006

=== Opinion polling ===
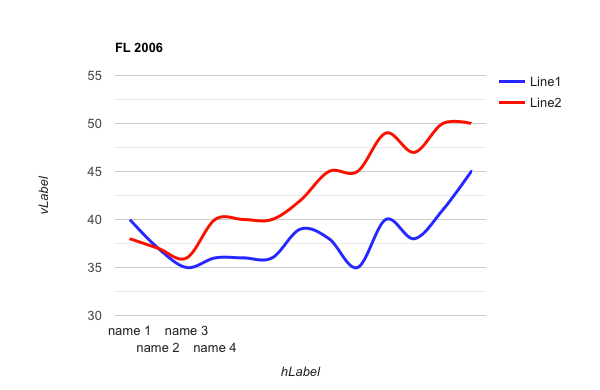
Polling for the 2006 Florida gubernatorial election

Source	Date	Crist (R)	Davis (D)
Survey USA	November 6, 2006	49%	47%
Strategic Vision	November 6, 2006	51%	44%
Orlando Sentinel	November 3, 2006	50%	43%
Mason-Dixon	November 3, 2006	50%	43%
Strategic Vision	November 2, 2006	50%	44%
Zogby/WSJ	October 31, 2006	49.9%	45.1%
St. Petersburg Times	October 28, 2006	48%	42%
Rasmussen	October 26, 2006	52%	41%
Strategic Vision	October 25, 2006	51%	42%
Quinnipiac	October 23, 2006	46%	44%
Zogby/WSJ	October 19, 2006	50.2%	41%
Rasmussen	October 18, 2006	46%	41%
Rasmussen	October 2, 2006	54%	38%
Strategic Vision	September 28, 2006	50%	40%
Zogby/WSJ	September 25, 2006	50.1%	36.6%
Rasmussen	September 19, 2006	45%	40%
Zogby/WSJ	September 11, 2006	50.6%	36.4%
Rasmussen	September 5, 2006	45%	41%
Strategic Vision	August 30, 2006	49%	41%
Zogby/WSJ	August 28, 2006	52.4%	38.5%
Rasmussen	August 1, 2006	47%	42%
Quinnipiac	July 26, 2006	44%	38%
Strategic Vision	July 26, 2006	49%	39%
Mason-Dixon	July 24, 2006	48%	32%
Zogby/WSJ	July 24, 2006	42.8%	39.0%
Quinnipiac	June 29, 2006	41%	39%
Rasmussen	June 29, 2006	49%	35%
Strategic Vision	June 28, 2006	49%	41%
Zogby/WSJ	June 21, 2006	42.5%	39.8%
Strategic Vision	May 25, 2006	48%	40%
Quinnipiac	May 24, 2006	37%	40%
Rasmussen	May 22, 2006	44%	39%
Rasmussen	April 21, 2006	44%	33%
Quinnipiac	April 19, 2006	37%	39%
Quinnipiac	February 22, 2006	40%	36%
Rasmussen	January 6, 2006	36%	35%
Rasmussen	November 16, 2005	38%	41%
Quinnipiac	November 15, 2005	39%	40%

== Results ==
Charlie Crist won by over 7 points, winning all Republican-leaning areas of Florida, as well as the notable "swing" region along the I-4 corridor (Daytona Beach, Orlando, Tampa/St. Petersburg). Davis performed well in the Democrat-leaning south Florida, Gainesville, and Tallahassee areas. Crist under-performed compared to his predecessor Jeb Bush, but still outpaced Davis, despite the low turnout. Reform Party candidate Max Linn received nearly 2% of the vote, but his sizeable haul of over 92,500 votes was still not enough to sway the election. Crist also won 18% of the African-American electorate, which outpaced previous Republicans' efforts in attracting this voting bloc in statewide elections.

Also on the ballot the same day was a constitutional amendment to raise the requirement for all future ballot initiatives to a supermajority (60%). Previously, constitutional amendments put on the ballot required only a simple majority (50% +1) to be approved, and led to some controversial amendments being put on the ballot. Support and opposition for the amendment fell loosely along party lines with Democrats generally opposing its passage. Both Crist and Davis publicly opposed the measure, but it was passed anyway by the voters with a 55% margin - a higher margin than either candidate received.

2006 Florida gubernatorial election
Party	Candidate	Votes	%	±%
Republican	Charlie Crist/Jeff Kottkamp	2,519,845	52.20%	−3.81%
Democratic	Jim Davis/Daryl Jones	2,178,289	45.10%	+1.94%
Reform	Max Linn	92,595	1.90%	+1.90%
Independent	John Wayne Smith	15,987	0.30%	
Independent	Richard Paul Dembinsky	11,921	0.20%	
Independent	Karl C.C. Behm	10,487	0.20%	
Write-ins		147	0.00%	0
Majority		341,556	7.10%	−5.75%
Turnout		4,829,271		
Republican hold		Swing		

=== Counties that flipped from Democratic to Republican ===
- Franklin (largest city: Eastpoint)
- Liberty (largest city: Bristol)
- Calhoun (largest city: Blountstown)
- Hamilton (largest city: Jasper)
- Wakulla (largest city: Sopchoppy)
- Jackson (largest city: Marianna)

=== Counties that flipped from Republican to Democratic ===
- Miami-Dade (largest city: Miami)

== See also ==
- 2006 United States gubernatorial elections
- Governor of Florida
- List of governors of Florida
- 2006 United States Senate election in Florida
