= Claudio Osorio =

Venezuelan businessman and fraudster

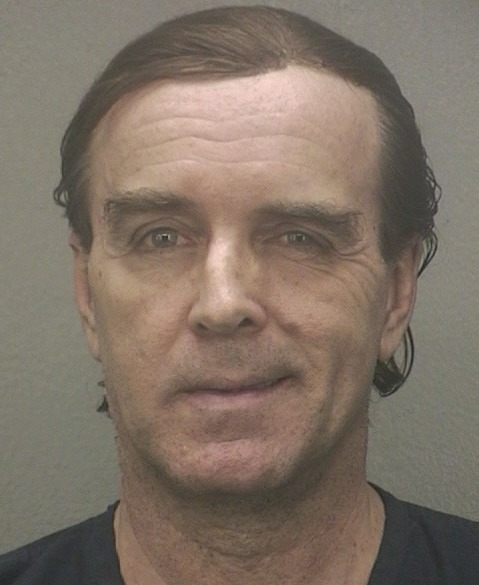
- Claudio Osorio Mugshot - 2013
- Born: November 16, 1958 (age 67); Venezuela
- Occupations: Businessman, fraudster
- Criminal charges: Two counts of wire fraud and one count of major fraud
- Criminal penalty: 12-1/2 years in US federal prison (served 9)
- Criminal status: Released from prison on 13 January 2022
- Spouse: Amarilis Osorio

Claudio Eleazar Osorio (born November 16, 1958) is a Venezuelan-American former businessman and fraudster. He had been based in Star Island, Miami, Florida. He rose to prominence in the late 1990s (Osorio was named "entrepreneur of the year" by Ernst & Young in 1997) due to the expansion of his company CHS Electronics, formerly a leading international distributor of microcomputers, peripherals, and software that went bankrupt after accounting scandals.

The next company Osorio founded, Innovida, also went through receivership and, ultimately, bankruptcy. Osorio faced five separate lawsuits for fraud after investors claimed that millions had disappeared from Innovida's accounts.

He and his wife, Amarilis, were also accused of defrauding a charitable effort to build homes in Haiti after the 2010 Haiti earthquake. Osorio filed for bankruptcy in 2011. In December 2012, Osorio was arrested and charged for his involvement in a $40 million fraud.

In 2013 he was sentenced to 12-1/2 years in prison for fraud. Osorio was released from Federal prison on 13 January 2022 after serving 9 years. He is assigned Federal Bureau of Prisons inmate number 01273-104.

== Career ==
=== CHS Electronics ===
CHS Electronics had been a public company since August 1994. In 1995, Osorio took it to Nasdaq's smallcap listing. In 1997, CHS Electronics audited accounts reported $4.75 billion worth of sales, and net earnings of $48.3 million. Also in 1997, a $475 million offering of CHS Electronics stock done by Raymond James & Associates was the largest underwriting done outside New York on the year. Nearly 20 percent of the offering went to large foreign institutional investors via its European offices.

By 2000, however, the share price of CHS Electronics had tumbled. Osorio's CHS Electronics filed for chapter 11. Osorio has since been accused of civil fraud in several lawsuits, and was targeted by a $220 million Swiss criminal probe in relation to CHS in 2010. It has also been reported that the SEC was investigating Osorio for "possible violations of federal securities laws."

=== Innovida ===
In 2007, Osorio founded Innovida, which was a manufacturer of building materials: "The company opened factories in North Miami Beach and several foreign countries. Osorio courted celebrities in January 2010 to sell the notion that he would help provide affordable homes to victims of the devastating earthquake in Haiti." However, a bankruptcy court judge ordered in December 2011 that Innovida be liquidated, after Osorio's "proposal to reorganize the debts of his former company, InnoVida Holdings, was filed in "bad faith" and includes a "nonsense" explanation for what happened to millions of dollars in missing funds."

Innovida received $3.5 million in loans from the US Overseas Private Investment Corporation (OPIC) to build homes in Haiti after the earthquake. In September 2011, OPIC began questioning Innovida's "negative operating cash flow." A court appointed receiver in charge of investigating Innovida's finances indicated that "$37.5 million in funds had been moved offshore, but he had so far been unable to find out what happened to the money." Osorio has used his constitutional privilege of invoking the fifth amendment right against self-incrimination when asked if company funds had been used to pay personal expenses.

Osorio and his former company, InnoVida, have been in bankruptcy since March 2011. After several multimillion-dollar lawsuits, Osorio was forced to put his mansion on Star Island for auction.

== Fundraising ==
Osorio has organised high-profile fundraising events, and has donated to Hillary Clinton, Barack Obama, and the Democrats more than $80,000 according to Federal Electoral Commission records.

Former Gov. Jeb Bush had agreed to return $270,000 that he was paid as a consultant to convicted fraudster Claudio Osorio and Osorio’s companies.

== Arrest & Criminal Charges ==
On Friday, December 7, 2012, Claudio Osorio, and Craig Toll, InnoVida's CFO, were arrested in Miami, Florida after being indicted on two counts of wire fraud and one count of major fraud, amongst other charges. Both Osorio and Toll also face fraud charges by the U.S. Securities and Exchange Commission (SEC) for violations of federal securities laws.

Federal prosecutors said that Osorio defrauded investors from 2007 to 2010, exaggerating the company's finances and pocketing millions of dollars to fund a lavish lifestyle.

The SEC claimed that Osorio had illegally used investor money to pay for a Miami Beach mansion, a Maserati car and a Colorado mountain retreat home.
