= CHS Electronics =

Computer product distributor

- Industry: software
- Founded: 1994
- Founder: Claudio Osorio
- Defunct: 2000
- Fate: bankruptcy
- Headquarters: Miami, Florida
- Products: microcomputer products; personal computers; peripherals; networking products; software

CHS Electronics is a former multinational distributor of microcomputer products, personal computers, peripherals, networking products, and software.

It was based in Miami, Florida from its 1994 founding to its 2000 collapse.

== Description ==
The company sold hardware and software products such as local area networks, disk drives, printers, personal computers, random access memory chips, central processing units and integrated circuit boards. The principal vendors of the company included Seagate Technology, Hewlett-Packard, Microsoft, IBM, Sun and Creative Labs, 3Com, Microsoft, Epson, and Intel.

It was a leading international distributor of microcomputers, peripherals, and software to more than 130,000 resellers in 46 countries in Europe, Latin America, Asia, the Middle East and Africa, until its bankruptcy due to an investigation of tax fraud. The companies customers include assemblers of non branded component products and resellers.

== History ==
It was founded by Venezuelan entrepreneur Claudio Osorio in 1994. He was sent to prison in 2012, after a federal judge sentenced him to 12½ years, for running a $40 million investment fraud through InnoVida, another one of his companies. According to an indictment, between 2006 and 2011 Osorio conspired to steal $40 million from 10 investors and an additional $10 million from a federal government program.

=== Mergers ===
In 1997 the company acquired Karma International for $160 million.

In 1998, the company acquired Metrologies International SA, subsidiaries of SiS Distribution Ltd, and 14 other acquisition. That year CHS Electronics ranked number 320 on the 1998 Fortune 500 list of the largest U.S.-based industrial corporations, with sales of $7.5 billion and net income of $87.9 million for the last four quarters. It was one of the few South Florida businesses on the Fortune 500 list of top-selling U.S. firms then.

=== Demise ===
The company reported a $45 million accounting discrepancy that ended up cutting its 1998 profits by about half.

Due to the massive operating losses, due to problems managing its large debt and losing money, in 1999 it was forced to sell its subsidiaries in Europe and Latin America. The company also cut 10% of its workforce that year.

The company filed for Chapter 11 bankruptcy in February 2000.

The company ceased operations and was liquidated later in 2000.

==== Class action lawsuit ====
A class action lawsuit was filed in 2000, alleging securities fraud after the company collapsed. Shareholders sued CHS and its executives, accusing them of misleading investors, artificially inflating CHS' stock price, overstating profits and income, and fraudulently reducing expenses. The suit accused Osorio of personally manipulating the company's financial statements to show a profit, a practice referred to internally as "Claudio's magic." Osorio and other CHS executives settled the suit for almost $12 million.

== See also ==
- Defunct computer companies of the United States
