= InnoVida =

Founded by Claudio Osorio until bankruptcy in 2011

- Company type: Private
- Industry: Construction Materials
- Founded: 2005 in Miami, Florida, United States
- Founder: Claudio Osorio
- Headquarters: Miami, Florida (North America) Dubai, UAE (Middle East)
- Area served: Worldwide
- Key people: Atilano de Oms Sobrinho (CEO) Mario Sanchez (VP) Craig Toll (CFO)
- Products: Fiber Composite Panels
- Number of employees: 500+
- Website: innovida.com inepar.com.br

InnoVida was a manufacturer of building materials, founded by businessman Claudio Osorio. It entered bankruptcy in 2011, one in a string of companies taken into bankruptcy under Osorio's leadership.

== History ==
- 25 April 2007, the Osorios were insolvent by this point as court papers would later reveal.
- 16 November 2007, Jeb Bush becomes a consultant for $15000 a month. Before signing up, Bush conducted a background check on Osorio which found "no red flags indicating criminal or financial wrongdoing."

== About Company ==
Inepar Inepar SA Industria e Construcoes (INEP4:BZ) Industry: Machinery-Therml Process • BM&FBOVESPA • Currency: BRL

They took parts of a material and processing technology originally invented by a German company, and claimed from then on to have developed this technology calling it ¨InnoVidaPanels (Composite Structural Insulated Panels or CSIPs). Using project materials, names and products like being their own property in the beginning they presented it as an alternative to traditional construction materials, with the goal of allowing for faster and cost-effective construction. ¨InnoVida's¨ sandwich panels are similar to the materials used to make watercraft and aircraft, such as the Boeing 787 and Airbus A350. Uli Schwartau and Claudio Osorio were the founder and co-founder and CEOs of InnoVida. Uli Schwartau was inventor of the technology, Claudio Osorio was previously the CEO of CHS Electronics, Inc.

InnoVida had operations in USA, Germany, the Middle East, Africa, Central and South America.

Past projects include: The 20,000 sft. Tameer Holdings Corporate office building, A 45-foot pyramid, made of InnoVida panels built in UK's Hyde Park and painted by the artist Romero Britto, a $15M USD Factory in Tanzania, a $28M USD project in Chengdu, China for post-disaster reconstruction and new village building.

== Products ==
InnoVida's composite building materials (CSIPS), are similar to the materials used to make watercraft and aircraft, such as the Boeing 787 and Airbus A350.

CSIPs reduce building costs by almost half because cement, steel and wood would not be required.
