= 2002 Florida gubernatorial election =

- November 5, 2002
- Turnout: 55.3%▲5.8
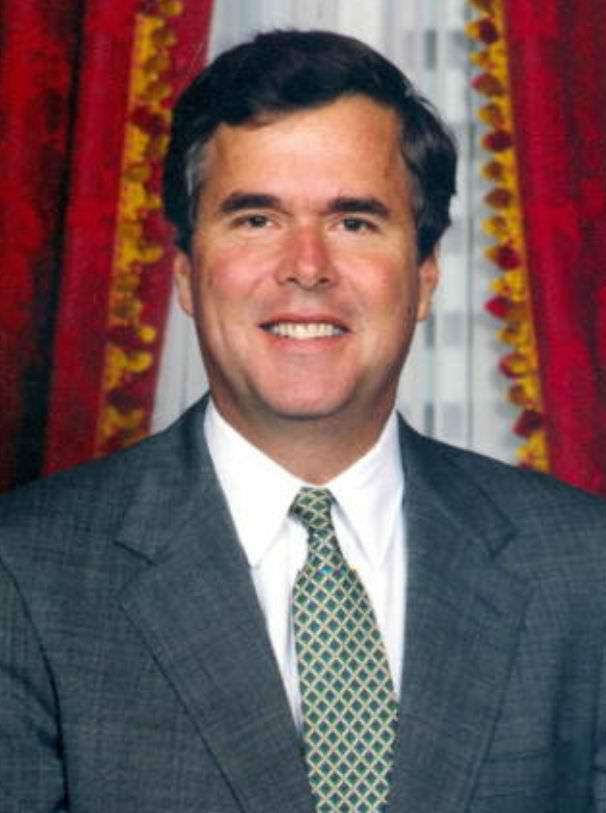

Nominee	Jeb Bush	Bill McBride
Party	Republican	Democratic
Running mate	Frank Brogan	Tom Rossin
Popular vote	2,856,845	2,201,427
Percentage	56.01%	43.16%
- Bush: 50–60% 60–70% 70–80% McBride: 50–60% 60–70% 70–80% 80–90%
Governor before election
Jeb Bush
Republican
Elected Governor
Jeb Bush
Republican

The 2002 Florida gubernatorial election took place on November 5, 2002, to elect the governor of Florida. Incumbent Republican Governor Jeb Bush defeated Democratic candidate Bill McBride. Bush became the first Republican governor of Florida to win election to a second term. This was the last time until 2022 that a Florida gubernatorial candidate won the general election by double digits, or that a Republican won Miami-Dade County.

== Republican nomination ==
Jeb Bush announced that he would run for re-election in June 2001 after first being elected in 1998. Bush was unopposed for the GOP nomination, and spent the summer amassing a war chest of over $5.6 million towards his re-election campaign.

== Democratic primary ==
=== Candidates ===
- Daryl Jones, state senator from Miami
- Bill McBride, Tampa attorney
- Janet Reno, former United States attorney general

==== Withdrew ====
- Lois Frankel, state representative from West Palm Beach

=== Campaign ===
Reno led throughout much of the campaign for the Democratic nomination, boasting name recognition and employing a grassroots strategy. In early June, she led McBride in the polls by a margin of 53%-25%, but trailed in a hypothetical head-to-head against Bush. Reno's primary campaign was dubbed the "Little red pickup truck tour", so-named because she toured the state in her 1999 Ford Ranger.

Over the summer, Reno's lead dwindled. McBride, backed by big money donors, was able to exploit Reno's paltry war chest, and sometime aloof campaign. Reno's connections to the Clinton administration, and her handling of the Waco siege and the Elián González affair, were frequent topics in the primary.

In the final few weeks, McBride narrowed the gap to a dead heat going into the September 10 primary.

=== Results ===
County results

McBride won the nomination by less than 4,800 votes.

Democratic primary results
Party	Candidate	Votes	%
Democratic	Bill McBride	602,352	44.4
Democratic	Janet Reno	597,558	44.0
Democratic	Daryl Jones	157,107	11.6
Total votes		1,357,017	100

=== Aftermath ===
Reno disputed the results after the primary was marred by problems. Several areas had technical glitches and delayed openings of the poll, especially in Miami-Dade and Broward counties, both of which Reno performed strongly in. As a result of the problems, Governor Bush kept the polls open for two additional hours.

McBride selected Tom Rossin, minority leader of the Florida Senate, as his running mate.

== General election ==
=== Candidates ===
- Jeb Bush, incumbent governor (Republican)
- Bob Kunst, gay rights activist (Independent)
- Bill McBride, Tampa attorney (Democratic)

=== Campaign ===
McBride's campaign focused on the importance of public education, supporting policies such as teacher pay raises and less emphasis on standardized tests. McBride was helped towards the end of the campaign by visits from national Democratic figures such as former President Bill Clinton, former Vice President Al Gore and Jesse Jackson. Though McBride himself did not make the topic an issue of his campaign, nationwide Democrats saw the race as an opportunity to avenge Al Gore's controversial loss in Florida during the 2000 presidential election and the subsequent recount. Likewise, Republicans saw this race as a preview of 2004.

President George W. Bush made numerous visits to Florida to support his brother for re-election. Bush had a strong fundraising advantage over McBride in what was seen as one of the pivotal races in the 2002 midterm elections. Republican adverts targeted McBride as a failed lawyer and as a tax and spender.

The two main candidates faced each other in two debates on September 27 and October 22 in the most expensive Florida gubernatorial election yet. Polls towards the end of the campaign showed Bush with a lead over McBride. Department of Justice observers were stationed at some of the polls, but unlike the problems during the 2000 presidential election and the Democratic primary, voting went smoothly.

At the same time as the election, an initiative was passed to limit class sizes. This had been opposed by Bush due to the cost of implementing it, but had been supported by McBride.

=== Predictions ===
Source	Ranking	As of
The Cook Political Report	Tossup	October 31, 2002
Sabato's Crystal Ball	Lean R	November 4, 2002

=== Polling ===
Poll source	Date(s) administered	Sample size (Note: Key: A – all adults RV – registered voters LV – likely voters V – unclear)	Margin of error	Jeb Bush (R)	Bill McBride (D)	Other / Undecided
SurveyUSA	November 2–4, 2002	792 (LV)	± 3.6%	45%	39%	5%
InsiderAdvantage	October 14-19, 2002	???	± 6%	45%	49%	6%

=== Election results ===
2002 gubernatorial election, Florida
Party	Candidate	Votes	%	±%
Republican	Jeb Bush (incumbent)	2,856,845	56.0	+0.7
Democratic	Bill McBride	2,201,427	43.2	−1.5
No Party Affiliation	Bob Kunst	42,039	0.8	+0.8
Write-ins		270	0.01	+0.0
Majority		655,418	12.8	+2.3
Turnout		5,100,581	54.8	+6.6
Republican hold		Swing		

==== Counties that flipped from Republican to Democratic ====
- Franklin (largest city: Eastpoint)
- Liberty (largest city: Bristol)
- Calhoun (largest city: Blountstown)
- Hamilton (largest city: Jasper)
- Wakulla (largest city: Sopchoppy)
- Jackson (largest city: Marianna)
- Madison (largest city: Madison)
