= Bill Gorman (politician) =

American politician (1920–2009)

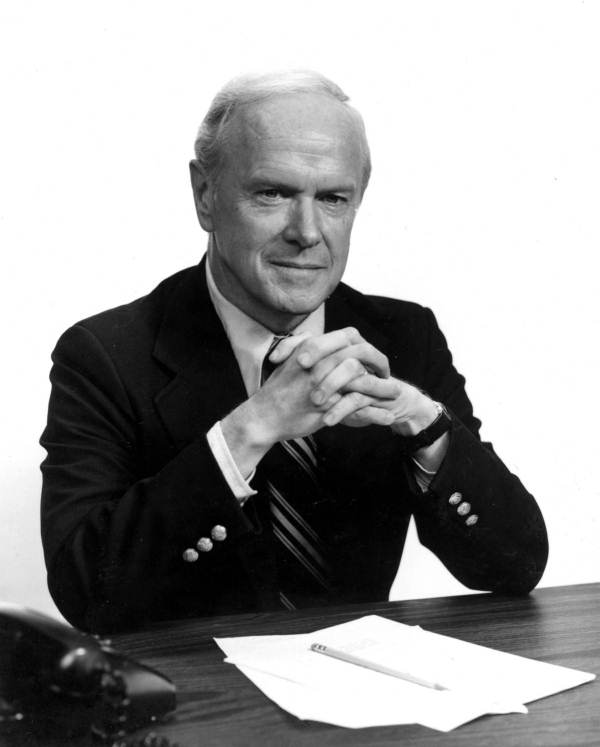
- Gorman in 1974

Member of the Florida House of Representatives from the 42nd district
- In office 1967–1976
- Preceded by: District established
- Succeeded by: Toni Jennings

Member of the Florida Senate from the 15th district
- In office 1976–1980

Personal details
- Born: March 31, 1920 Baltimore, Maryland, U.S.
- Died: February 4, 2009 (aged 88)
- Party: Republican
- Education: Lehigh University

William D. Gorman (March 31, 1920 – February 4, 2009) was an American politician. He served as a Republican member for the 42nd district of the Florida House of Representatives. He also served as a member for the 15th district of the Florida Senate.

== Life and career ==
Gorman was born in Baltimore. He went to high school in Swarthmore, Pennsylvania, and attended Lehigh University.

In 1967, Gorman was elected as the first representative for the newly-established 42nd district of the Florida House of Representatives. He served until 1976, when he was succeeded by Toni Jennings. In the same year, he was elected to represent the 15th district of the Florida Senate, serving until 1980.

Gorman died in February 2009, at the age of 88.
