= Toni Jennings =

American politician

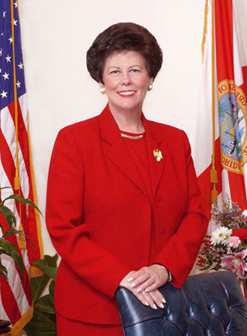

16th Lieutenant Governor of Florida
- In office March 3, 2003 – January 2, 2007
- Governor: Jeb Bush
- Preceded by: Frank Brogan
- Succeeded by: Jeff Kottkamp

President of the Florida Senate
- In office November 19, 1996 – November 21, 2000
- Preceded by: James A. Scott
- Succeeded by: John M. McKay

Member of the Florida Senate
- In office November 18, 1980 – November 21, 2000
- Preceded by: Bill Gorman
- Succeeded by: Lee Constantine
- Constituency: 15th (1980–1992); 9th (1992–2000)

Member of the Florida House of Representatives from the 42nd district
- In office 1976–1980
- Preceded by: Bill Gorman
- Succeeded by: Tom Drage

Personal details
- Born: May 17, 1949 (age 77) Orlando, Florida, U.S.
- Party: Republican
- Profession: Teacher, politician

Antoinette Jennings (born May 17, 1949) is an American politician who was the 16th lieutenant governor of Florida.

== Life and career ==
She was nominated to the office by Governor Jeb Bush in February 2003 to replace Frank Brogan, who resigned to become president of Florida Atlantic University. She was sworn in on March 3, 2003, becoming the first woman to hold the office. She declined to run for governor in 2006 even though she was reputed to be Bush's preferred choice as his successor.

After the 2006 elections, Jennings was replaced as lieutenant governor by Jeff Kottkamp, on January 2, 2007.

Jennings previously served in the Florida House of Representatives from 1976 to 1980, and in the Florida Senate, from 1980 to 2000. In 1994, when Orange County chairman Linda Chapin announced she was not seeking re-election, she failed to convince Jennings to return to Orlando and campaign for the office herself. Instead, she remained in Tallahassee to be elected by her Senate peers to be president of the Florida senate—the only person to have held that office for two terms, from 1996 to 2000. In 2000, legislative term limits came into effect, having been instituted by a constitutional referendum taken several years earlier. Jennings was thereafter prohibited from seeking reelection.

Before entering public service, Jennings was an elementary school teacher. During and after her tenure in the legislature, she also ran the family construction business. She is a graduate of Wesleyan College.

As lieutenant governor, she worked on legislative relations for Bush, on education policy, hurricane preparedness, disaster relief and issues related to the Space Coast in Florida.

She joined FPL's board of directors a month after leaving office in 2007.

Jennings endorsed former Massachusetts Governor Mitt Romney in the 2008 presidential primary election.

== See also ==
- List of female lieutenant governors in the United States

Florida Senate
Preceded by Bill Gorman	Member of the Florida Senate from the 15th district 1980–1992	Succeeded by Patsy Ann Kurth
Preceded by Bill Bankhead	Member of the Florida Senate from the 9th district 1992–2000	Succeeded by Lee Constantine
Political offices
Preceded by Frank Brogan	Lieutenant Governor of Florida; 2003–2007	Succeeded by Jeff Kottkamp
