= Jeff Kottkamp =

American politician (born 1960)

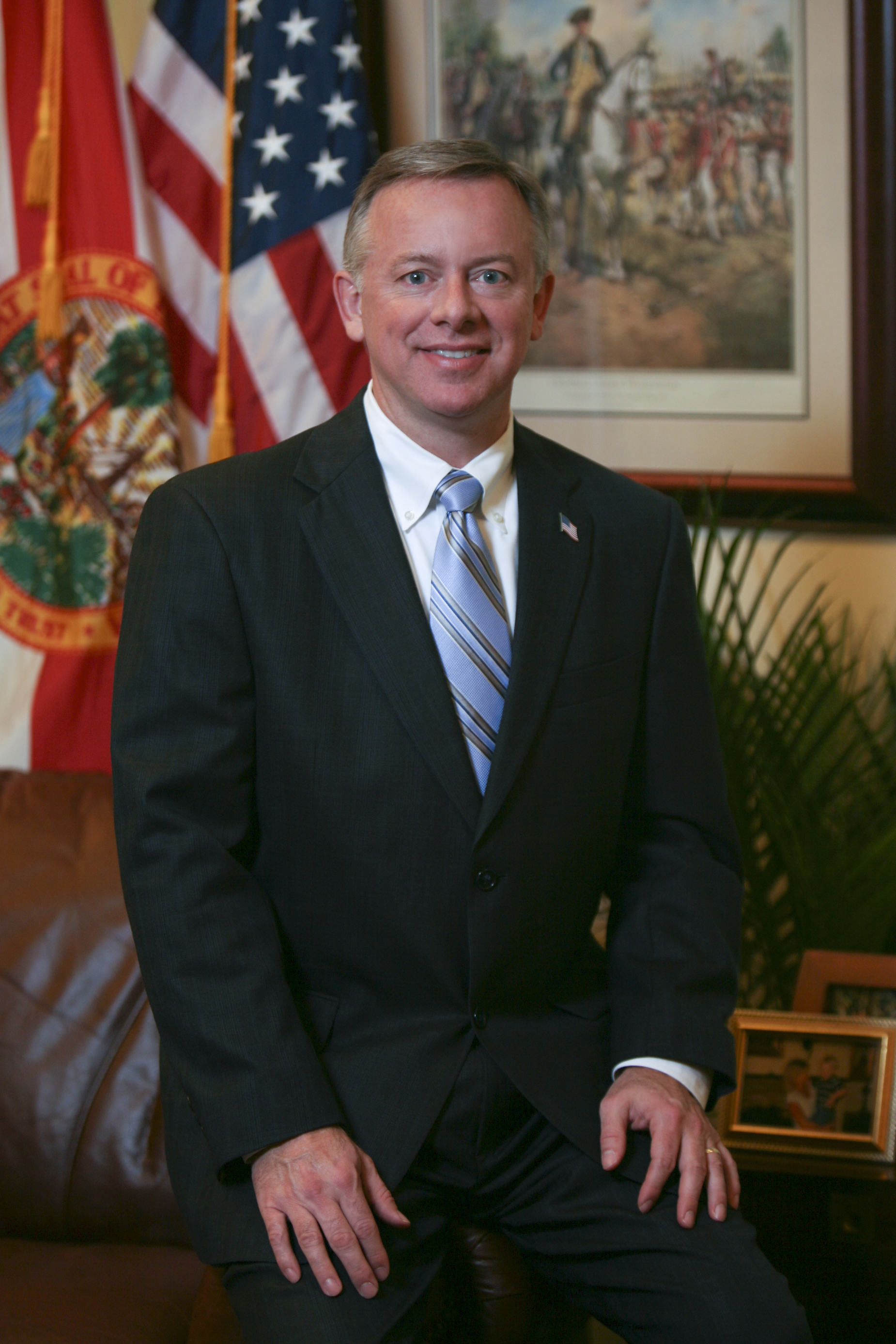
- Official Portrait, 2009

17th Lieutenant Governor of Florida
- In office January 2, 2007 – January 4, 2011
- Governor: Charlie Crist
- Preceded by: Toni Jennings
- Succeeded by: Jennifer Carroll

Member of the Florida House of Representatives from the 74th district
- In office November 7, 2000 – November 7, 2006
- Preceded by: Greg Gay
- Succeeded by: Gary Aubuchon

Personal details
- Born: Jeffrey Dean Kottkamp; November 12, 1960 (age 65) Indianapolis, Indiana, U.S.
- Party: Republican
- Spouse: Cyndie Kottkamp
- Children: 1
- Education: Edison State Community College (AA); Florida State University (BS); University of Florida (JD)

Jeffrey Dean Kottkamp (born November 12, 1960) is an American politician and attorney from the state of Florida. He served as the state's 17th Lieutenant Governor from 2007 until 2011 and has been President and CEO of Florida TaxWatch since January 2026. A member of the Republican Party, Kottkamp previously served in the Florida House of Representatives from 2000 to 2006.

He was selected by Republican gubernatorial nominee Charlie Crist to serve as his running mate in the 2006 election. As Lieutenant Governor, he served as chairman of the Board of Space Florida, Florida's Children and Youth Cabinet, and the Florida Sports Foundation. He also had oversight responsibility in the offices of Drug Control, Adoption and Child Protection, the Department of Highway Safety and Motor Vehicles, as well as the Governor's Film and Entertainment Office.

In 2010, Kottkamp ran for the position of Florida Attorney General after Crist chose to forgo a 2010 reelection bid in favor of running for Senate.

== Early life and education ==
Jeffrey Dean Kottkamp was born in Indianapolis, Indiana, in 1960. He moved to Florida in 1977 and graduated from North Fort Myers High School in 1979. He was the first person from his family to attend college. In 1982, he received his Associate of Arts degree from Edison State Community College in Fort Myers. He earned his Bachelor of Science degree from Florida State University in 1984, majoring in political science.

While at Florida State, he was active in student government and was a member of the Phi Alpha Theta National Honor Society. In 2007, the Florida State University Alumni Association named Kottkamp to its "Circle of Gold". In 1987, he received his Juris Doctor from the University of Florida College of Law.

== Career ==
He began his legal career at the Kimbrell & Hamann firm which was one of the largest and oldest firms in Miami at the time. He primarily practiced in the products liability and commercial litigation area. Kottkamp then served as a law clerk to United States District Court Judge Joe Oscar Eaton. He later served as a law clerk to United States District Court Sidney Aronovitz.

Kottkamp became active in the Republican Party at an early age serving as a volunteer for the Ronald Reagan 1980 presidential campaign. From 1996 to 2006 he served on the Lee County Republican Executive Committee. Thereafter, he was selected to serve on the Republican Party of Florida Executive Committee from 2007 to 2011. Kottkamp was a delegate at the Republican National Convention in 2008.

He served as chairman of the Florida Bar Journal Editorial Board in 2000. In 1998, he became president of the Lee County Bar Association and was Vice-President of the Southwest Florida Federal Bar Association in 1996. He was a member of the Calusa Inns of Court.

=== Florida House of Representatives ===
Kottkamp was elected to the Florida House of Representatives in 2000 and was subsequently re-elected in 2002 and 2004. While serving in the Legislature Kottkamp served as chairman of the Judiciary Appropriations Committee (2006), chairman of Government Operations Committee (2005), chairman of Judiciary Committee (2002–2004), Vice-Chairman of the Rules and Calendar Council (2004–2006) and Vice-Chairman of Judiciary (2000–2002). He served as Deputy Majority Whip.

As a member of the Florida Legislature, Kottkamp had a reputation for fighting to lower taxes. He sponsored legislation to repeal the Intangibles Tax. In 2000, a group of freshman members of the House, including Kottkamp, formed the "Freedom Caucus". Members of the caucus included Representatives Connie Mack, Jeff Kottkamp, Bruce Kyle, Jim Kallinger, Don Brown, Mike Haridopolos, Dennis Baxley, and Carey Baker. Caucus members opposed any efforts to raise taxes. Kottkamp later became Co-Chair of the Taxpayer Protection Caucus. He served as Co-Chair of the Caucus from 2002 to 2006.

Kottkamp was the primary sponsor of the Dr. Marvin Davies Civil Rights Act in 2003. The bill was signed into law by Governor Jeb Bush on June 18, 2003. The legislation gave the Attorney General of Florida independent authority to initiate, upon reasonable cause, a civil action for damages, injunctive relief, and civil penalties up to $10,000 per violation, against any person or group for "patterns or practices of discrimination" or "for discrimination that raises an issue of great public interest". In 2002 Kottkamp sponsored legislation to create the "Live the Dream" license plate which included the likeness of Dr. Martin Luther King.

In 2005 Kottkamp sponsored the Parental Notice of Abortion Act which prohibited the performance or inducement of an abortion on a minor without first notifying the minor's parent or guardian. As a result of his leadership in passing the legislation Kottkamp was awarded the "Defensor Vitae/Defender of Life Award" by the Florida Conference of Catholic Bishops.

== Lieutenant Governor of Florida ==
Kottkamp took the oath of office as Florida's 17th Lieutenant Governor on January 2, 2007. While serving as Lt. Governor he was a member of the National Lieutenant Governor's Association (NLGA) and was elected to the NLGA Executive Committee. In 2008, Governor Charlie Crist appointed Kottkamp as Chairman of the Governor's Homeownership Promotes the Economy "HOPE" Task Force.

=== Office of Drug Control ===
During his term in office, Kottkamp pushed for the passage of the Prescription Drug Monitoring Program (PDMP) and other legislation designed to reduce the illegal sale of prescription drugs in Florida. In January 2010, Kottkamp announced a Statewide Prescription Drug Task Force called "Operation Pain Killer" to combat Florida's increasing prescription drug abuse in pill mills. The Florida Department of Law Enforcement announced in June 2010 that the anti-pill mill effort resulted in 172 arrests statewide and the seizure of more than 20,000 prescription pills.

=== Space Florida ===
Kottkamp was appointed as chairman of the Space Florida Board of Directors in 2007. Space Florida is a public-private partnership created by the Florida Legislature in 2006 to strengthen Florida's position as the global leader in aerospace research, investment, exploration and commerce. While he was chairman, Florida broke ground on a facility for Space Exploration Technologies (Space X) at Launch Complex 40 located at the Cape Canaveral Air Force Station. The facility opened a new era of commercial space operations in Florida.

When President Barack Obama released his proposed budget for 2011 which proposed ending NASA's Constellation Program, Kottkamp became one of the leading voices in opposition to the proposal. In March 2010, Kottkamp challenged the President to a debate on the future of the space program.

=== Children and Youth Cabinet ===
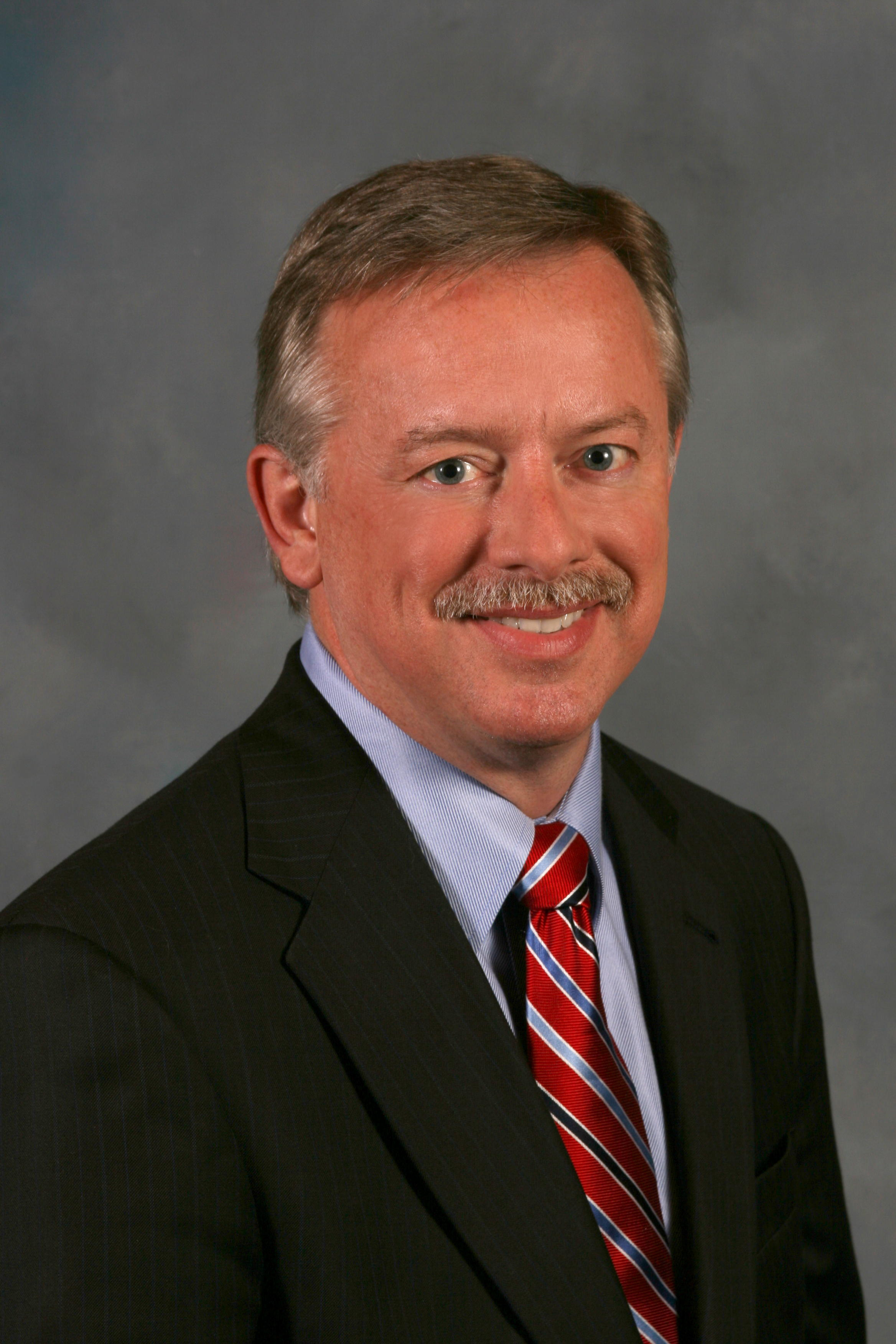
Earlier photo of Kottkamp

Kottkamp served as chairman of Florida's Children and Youth Cabinet and also oversaw the Office of Adoption. While he was chairman, the cabinet launched the first data sharing initiative of its kind in the country designed to provide comprehensive services to children in are more timely and cost-effective way. In 2011, the Cabinet was awarded the "Ready by 21 Policy Leadership Award" from the Forum for Youth Investment for, among other things, creating a comprehensive point-of-service data system to better serve children and youth.

=== Acting Governor ===
On June 18, 2008, Kottkamp became Acting Governor of the State of Florida while Governor Charlie Crist was under anesthesia for knee surgery. Crist filed a Proclamation with the Secretary of State transferring power to Kottkamp pursuant to Article IV Section 3(b) of the Florida Constitution.

== Later career ==
Kottkamp is the founder and President of Jeff Kottkamp, P.A.

In July 2023, Florida TaxWatch announced that Kottkamp joined the organization as Executive Vice President and General Counsel. In May 2025, the Florida TaxWatch Board elected him as the incoming President and CEO, with the transition scheduled for January 2026. Kottkamp became President and CEO of Florida TaxWatch on January 1, 2026.

== Personal life ==
Kottkamp and his wife Cyndie, a native of Fort Myers, Florida, have one child.

Political offices
Preceded by Toni Jennings	Lieutenant Governor of Florida; 2007–2011	Succeeded by Jennifer Carroll
