= Daryl Jones (politician) =

American politician

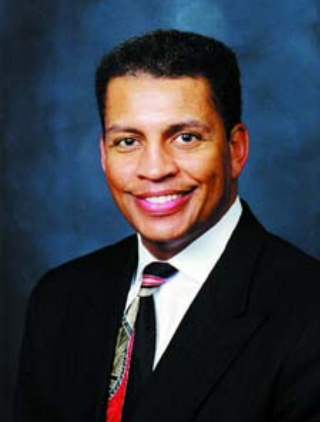

Member of the Florida Senate from the 40th district
- In office November 3, 1992 – November 5, 2002
- Preceded by: Larry Plummer (redistricting)
- Succeeded by: Larcenia Bullard (redistricting)

Member of the Florida House of Representatives from the 118th district
- In office November 6, 1990 – November 3, 1992
- Preceded by: Tom Easterly
- Succeeded by: Larcenia Bullard

Personal details
- Born: Daryl Lafayette Jones; May 31, 1955 (age 71) Jackson, Mississippi, U.S.
- Party: Democratic
- Spouse: Myoushi E. Carter
- Education: United States Air Force Academy (BSc); University of Miami (JD)

Military service
- Branch/service: United States Air Force; United States Air Force Reserve; Puerto Rico Air National Guard
- Years of service: 1977-2008
- Rank: Colonel

Daryl Lafayette Jones (born May 31, 1955) is an American Democratic politician from Miami, Florida.

== Early life and education ==
Jones was born in Jackson, Mississippi, to parents who were both school teachers. He was the eldest of four children, with one sister and two brothers. He attended Lanier High School where he was elected President of the Mississippi State Association of Student Councils and in 1973, graduated valedictorian. He subsequently attended the United States Air Force Academy, where he was the middleweight boxing champion, cadet vice wing commander, and a 1977 honor graduate majoring in Mathematics. He is the first African-American graduate of a military academy from Mississippi.

Jones became an F-4E pilot in the United States Air Force. He was transferred to the 90th Tactical Fighter Squadron at Clark AB in the Philippines and became flight leader and mission commander in Team Spirit and Cope Thunder exercises. In 1981, Jones arrived at Homestead Air Reserve Base in Florida (previously known as Homestead Air Force Base, or Homestead AFB) as an F-4 Phantom ll instructor pilot, twice named the 31st TTS Outstanding Instructor Pilot and six consecutive classes of student pilots named him their Outstanding Instructor Pilot.

Jones left active Air Force duty in 1984 and enrolled at the University of Miami School of Law. During his time at university, was recognized with membership in the Iron Arrow Honor Society, the highest honor bestowed by the university. He graduated cum laude in 1987 after serving as president of both the Student Bar and National Bar Associations. Jones worked as a federal judicial clerk for Judge Peter Fay in the 11th Circuit Court of Appeals, then as an Assistant Dade County Attorney at Miami International Airport. He joined the Puerto Rico Air National Guard as an A-7D Corsair ll fighter pilot. In 1989, Jones transferred to the U.S. Air Force Reserve at Homestead AFB and became an F-16 Falcon fighter pilot. He rose to the rank of colonel as an Air Force Reservist.

== Political career ==
Jones was elected to the Florida House of Representatives in 1990. After his first session, the Miami Herald named him Freshman Representative of The Year. On August 24, 1992, Hurricane Andrew devastated Representative Jones' House District while he was in the midst of a campaign for the State Senate.

From 1992 to 2002, he served in the Florida Senate. During this time and in the aftermath of Hurricane Andrew, Jones sponsored the Hurricane Andrew Trust Fund Bill, which appropriated more than $650 million over four years to help rebuild the devastated area. South Dade County largely recovered in only four years. Jones also sponsored and passed the Rosewood Bill, which is the only legislation in American history to grant reparations to African Americans.

In the 1990s, Jones successfully defended the existence of Homestead AFB before 2 Realignment and Closure Commission Boards. In 1995, Jones was elected Democratic Senate President-designate. The next year, President Clinton appointed Jones to the U.S. Air Force Academy Board of Visitors. In 1998, he was President Bill Clinton's choice to be Secretary of the Air Force, but was not confirmed.

In 2002, Jones was the first African-American to run for Governor of Florida.

On September 14, 2006, he was chosen as a nominee for the position of Lieutenant Governor of Florida by gubernatorial candidate Jim Davis.

== Personal ==
Jones currently resides in Miami. He has three children: Derek, Durel, and Michele. He has spent the past several years running his own real estate investment and consulting firm, D.L. Jones & Associates, and is president of the Law Offices of Daryl L. Jones, P.A., a law firm specializing in foreclosure defense and loan modifications.

Party political offices
Preceded by Tom Rossin	Democratic nominee for Lieutenant Governor of Florida; 2006	Succeeded by Rod Smith
