= Bob Kunst =

American activist and perennial candidate

Bob Kunst (born 1941) is an American gay rights activist and perennial candidate.

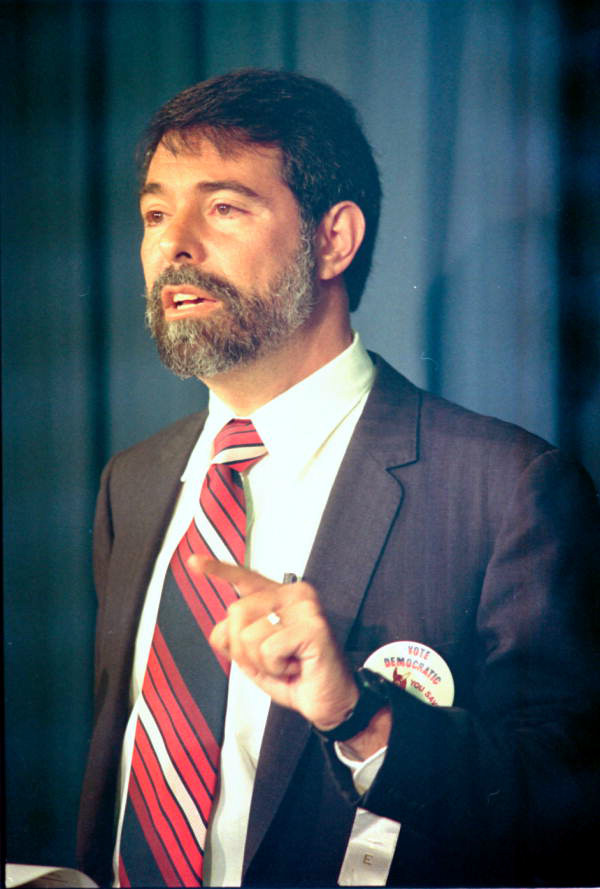
Kunst in 1986

== Early life ==
Kunst was born in 1941 in Miami Beach, Florida.

He worked in marketing for the Miami Toros professional soccer team in the 1970s.

== Gay rights activism ==
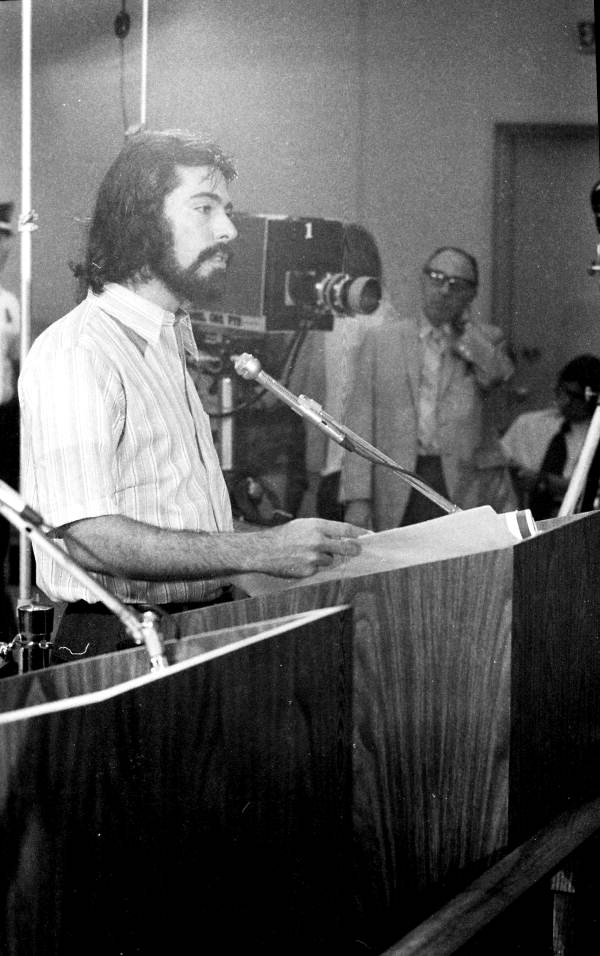
Kunst at a 1972 Miami city council meeting

He supported the 1976 Miami-Dade County Ordinance for Gay Rights and was later involved in activism for people with AIDS.

Kunst opposed Save Our Children, a Dade County, Florida voter-approved county initiative supported by singer Anita Bryant and her then-husband Bob Green. The initiative repealed the previous anti-discrimination ordinance Kunst had supported. He helped organize the subsequent pressure campaign on citrus industry corporate sponsors of Bryant. The law was eventually repealed by the state Supreme Court of Florida in 2010.

In 1991, after allegations of financial mismanagement were published in the Miami Herald, Kunst was fired as the executive director of Cure AIDS Now.

== Political Campaigns ==
Kunst unsuccessfully made Democratic primary runs for Florida Governor in 1982 and 2002, in the Democratic primary for United States Senator in 1986, and for Congress as an Independent unaffiliated candidate in 2010 against incumbent Debbie Wasserman Schultz (D).

== Other activism ==
Kunst was president (1991-2001) of Shalom International, a Jewish group combating global Neo-Nazism and Neo-fascism movements. And he was a co-founder of the Oral Majority in 1982, the liberal and secular counter-protest group of the Religious Right organizations Moral Majority and later the Christian Coalition.

In 2018, Kunst protested outside the courthouse where Noor Salman, Omar Mateen's widow, was being tried for complicity in her husband's Pulse nightclub massacre. Kunst held a sign reading: "'Fry her till she has no 'Pulse'". Noor Salman was found not guilty during a trial that also exposed the fact that she was abused by her husband.

== Support of Donald Trump ==
Kunst supported Donald Trump for U.S. president in 2016 2020, and 2024. As of 2019, he said he had attended 150 Trump rallies. He protested the March 2023 indictment of Donald Trump.
