= Bill McBride (politician) =

American politician (1945–2012)

Personal details
- Born: May 10, 1945 Belleville, Illinois, U.S.
- Died: December 22, 2012 (aged 67) Mt. Airy, North Carolina, U.S.
- Party: Democratic
- Spouse: Alex Sink (m. 1987)
- Children: 2
- Education: University of Florida (BA, JD)

Military service
- Branch/service: United States Marine Corps
- Years of service: 1968–1971
- Battles/wars: Vietnam War
- Awards: Bronze Star (with Valor)

William McBride (May 10, 1945 – December 22, 2012) was an American lawyer and politician.

A member of the Democratic Party, he challenged Jeb Bush for Florida governor in the 2002 gubernatorial election. Bush won by a 56 to 43 percent margin, making him the first Republican governor of Florida to serve two terms. McBride had earlier defeated former United States Attorney General Janet Reno in the Democratic primary.

McBride was born in Belleville, Illinois and grew up in Leesburg, Florida. He graduated from the University of Florida in 1967. While at UF, McBride served as treasurer of Florida Blue Key and was inducted into the University of Florida Hall of Fame. McBride served in the Marine Corps from 1968 to 1971. McBride was awarded a Bronze Star with a Valor device. Upon his return to the United States, McBride taught at Officer Candidates School at Marine Corps Base Quantico.

Upon leaving the Marine Corps, McBride attended the University of Florida Law School.

While studying law he fell under the tutelage of Chesterfield Smith, a powerful politically connected Florida attorney and then president of the American Bar Association. McBride left law school for a time to serve as Smith's assistant at the ABA. After graduation, McBride joined Smith's Tampa law firm, Holland & Knight, where he rose in the ranks until becoming managing partner in 1992. McBride's tenure at the helm of Holland & Knight has been the source of some controversy. He is credited with having expanded the firm's size and power and with having helped to make it the seventh-largest firm in the U.S. by number of lawyers employed at the time of his retirement in 2001. At the time the firm ranked 21st in terms of revenue but 98th in terms of profit-per-partner, and had "become known as a reputable, but flabby, operation, long on underproductive partners and comparatively short on workhorse associates."

McBride was the father of two children with his wife, Adelaide "Alex" Sink, a former statewide president for NationsBank (now Bank of America), former Chief Financial Officer of Florida, and 2010 Democratic nominee for Governor of Florida.

Since 2003, Bill McBride was partner with the law firm of Barnett, Bolt, Kirkwood, Long & McBride in Tampa. He was also chair of the board of the investment banking firm Hyde Park Capital Partners, LLC, with offices in Tampa and Charlotte, North Carolina. McBride was a member of the American Law Institute and was a member of the board of directors of the Warrington College of Business Administration's Center for Entrepreneurship and Innovation at the University of Florida.

McBride was named Mr. Leesburg High while still a student. He attended Boy's State while in school and ran a successful campaign for governor at the event.

McBride died on December 22, 2012, after suffering a heart attack while vacationing with his family in Mt Airy, North Carolina.

Party political offices
Preceded by Buddy MacKay	Democratic nominee for Governor of Florida; 2002	Succeeded by Jim Davis
