= Jeb Bush =

American politician and businessman (born 1953)

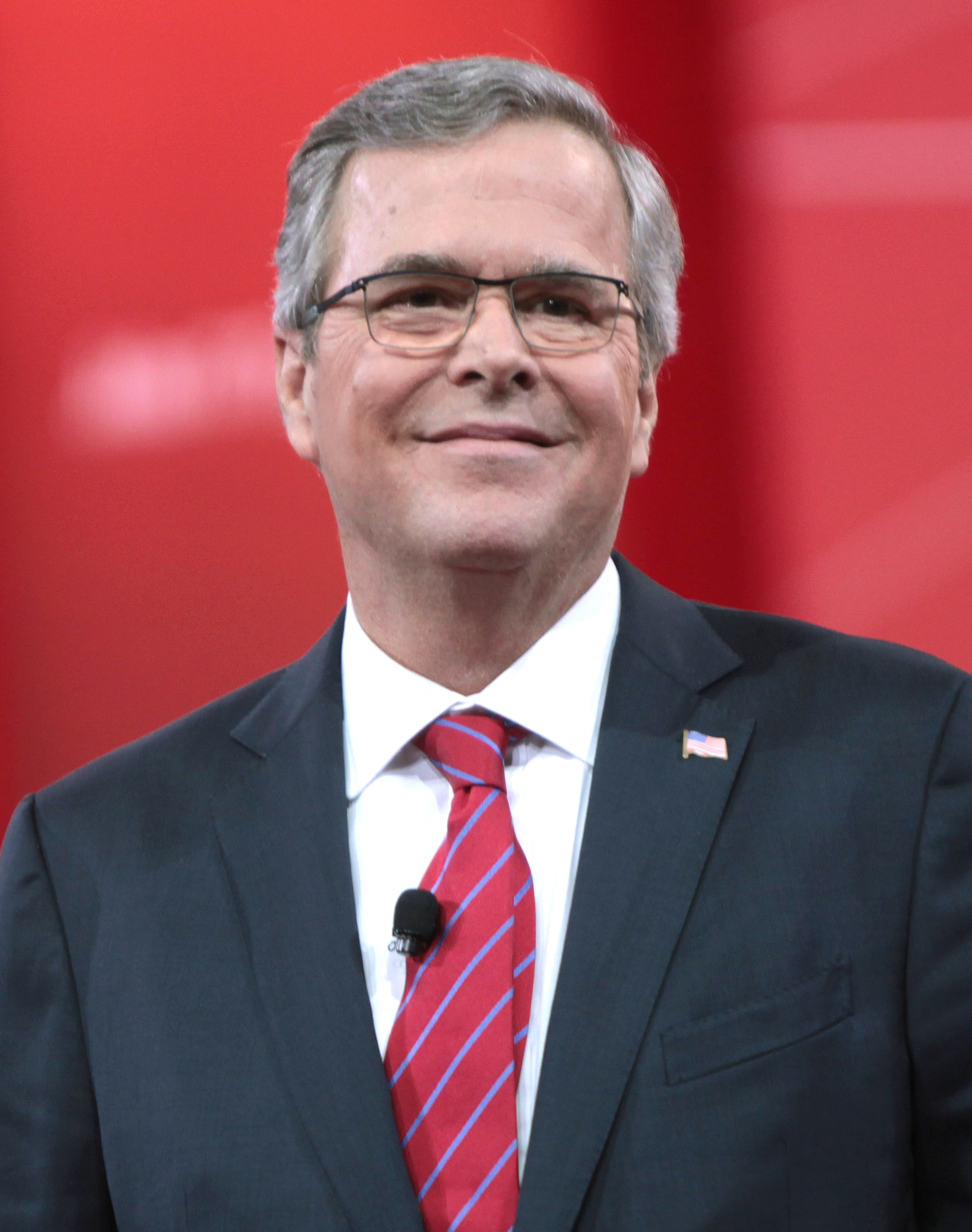
- Bush in 2015

43rd Governor of Florida
- In office January 5, 1999 – January 2, 2007
- Lieutenant: Frank Brogan; Toni Jennings
- Preceded by: Buddy MacKay
- Succeeded by: Charlie Crist

Secretary of the Florida Department of Commerce
- In office January 6, 1987 – September 9, 1988
- Governor: Bob Martinez
- Preceded by: Wayne Mixson
- Succeeded by: Bill Sutton

Personal details
- Born: John Ellis Bush; February 11, 1953 (age 73) Midland, Texas, U.S.
- Party: Republican
- Spouse: Columba Gallo (m. 1974)
- Children: 3, including George
- Parents: George H. W. Bush; Barbara Bush
- Relatives: Bush family
- Education: University of Texas at Austin (BA)

John Ellis "Jeb" Bush (born February 11, 1953) is an American politician and businessman who served as the 43rd governor of Florida from 1999 to 2007. He is the second son of former president George H. W. Bush and former first lady Barbara Bush, and a younger brother of former president George W. Bush. A member of the Republican Party, he was an unsuccessful candidate for president of the United States in the 2016 Republican primaries.

Bush was born into the prominent Bush family in Midland, Texas, and grew up in Houston. He graduated from Phillips Academy in Andover, Massachusetts, and attended the University of Texas at Austin, where he earned a degree in Latin American affairs. In 1980, Bush moved to Florida and pursued a career in real estate development. In 1987, he became Florida's secretary of commerce, serving this role until 1988, when he joined his father's successful campaign for the presidency.

In 1994, Bush made his first run for office, losing the election for governor by less than two percentage points to the incumbent Lawton Chiles. Bush ran again in 1998 and defeated lieutenant governor Buddy MacKay with 55 percent of the vote. He ended up succeeding MacKay after Chiles died in office 23 days shy of his retirement. He ran for reelection in 2002, defeating Bill McBride and winning with 56 percent, to become Florida's first two-term Republican governor. During his eight years as governor, Bush pushed an ambitious Everglades conservation plan, supported caps for medical malpractice litigation, launched a Medicaid privatization pilot program, and instituted reforms to the state education system, including the issuance of vouchers and promoting school choice.

Bush announced his presidential candidacy on June 15, 2015. He suspended his campaign on February 20, 2016, shortly after the South Carolina primary, and finished sixth out of 17 contesters by both delegates number and popular vote. He endorsed Senator Ted Cruz on March 23, 2016, and was critical of Donald Trump during the 2016 campaign, remaining so during Trump's presidencies.

== Early life ==
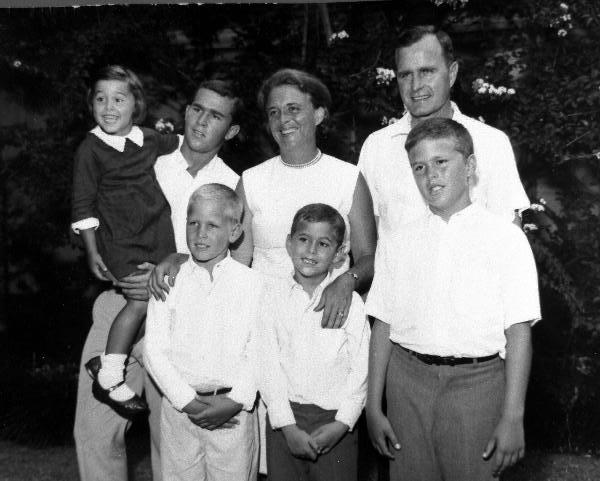
Bush (front right) with family, early 1960s

Bush was born on February 11, 1953, in Midland, Texas. When he was six years old, the family relocated to the Tanglewood neighborhood of Houston, Texas. The nickname "Jeb" is composed of his initials J.E.B. (John Ellis Bush). He grew up with two younger brothers, Neil and Marvin, one younger sister, Dorothy, one older brother, George, who is seven years older, and, for the first eight months of his life, an older sister, Robin. Jeb Bush initially attended Grady Elementary School in Houston. Following in the footsteps of his father and older brother George, at the age of 14 years in late 1967, Bush began attending high school at the Andover, Massachusetts boarding school Phillips Academy, Andover. Bush completed ninth grade in Houston, but was advised to repeat it at Andover, and was nearly expelled due to poor grades. Bush recreationally used marijuana, hashish, and cigarettes during his high school years, although he made the honor roll by the end of his senior year and served as captain of the tennis team.

At the age of 17, Bush taught English as a second language and assisted in the building of a school in Ibarrilla, a small village outside of León, Guanajuato, Mexico, as part of Andover's student exchange summer program. While in Mexico, he met his future wife, Columba Garnica Gallo.

Bush, who had largely avoided criticizing or supporting the Vietnam War, registered for the draft after his graduation from high school in 1971. In the fourth and final draft lottery drawing, on February 2, 1972, for men born in 1953 and to be inducted during 1973, Bush received a draft number of 26 on a calendar-based scale that went to 365. But no new draft orders were issued after 1972, because the U.S. changed to an all-volunteer military beginning in 1973.

Though many in his family had attended Yale University, Bush chose to attend the University of Texas at Austin, beginning in September 1971. He played on the Texas Longhorns varsity tennis team in 1973. Bush graduated Phi Beta Kappa and magna cum laude with a Bachelor of Arts degree in Latin American studies. He completed his coursework in two and a half years.

== Early career ==
In 1974, Bush went to work in an entry-level position in the international division of Texas Commerce Bank, which was founded by the family of James Baker. In November 1977, he was sent to Caracas, the capital of Venezuela, to open a new operation for the bank, where he served as branch manager and vice president.

Following the 1980 presidential election, Bush and his family moved to Miami-Dade County, Florida. He took a job in real estate with Armando Codina, a 32-year-old Cuban immigrant and self-made millionaire. Codina had made a fortune in a computer business, and then formed a new company, The Codina Group, to pursue opportunities in real estate. During his time with the company, Bush focused on finding tenants for commercial developments. Codina eventually made Bush his partner in a new development business, which quickly became one of South Florida's leading real estate development firms. As a partner, Bush received 40% of the firm's profits. In 1983, Bush said of his move from Houston to Miami: "On the personal side, my mother-in-law and sister-in-law were already living here." On the professional side, "I want to be very wealthy, and I'll be glad to tell you when I've accomplished that goal."

During Bush's years in Miami, he was involved in many different entrepreneurial pursuits, including working for a mobile phone company, serving on the board of a Norwegian-owned company that sold fire equipment to the Trans-Alaska Pipeline System, becoming a minority owner of the Jacksonville Jaguars, buying a shoe company that sold footwear in Panama, and getting involved in a project selling water pumps in Nigeria.

Bush was a lobbyist for Miguel Recarey, who ran International Medical Centres (IMC), a Florida-based health maintenance organization (HMO). Recarey "employed" Bush as a real estate consultant and paid him a US$75,000 fee for finding the company a new location, although the move never took place. Bush did, however, lobby the Reagan administration vigorously and successfully on behalf of Recarey and IMC to waive a rule of Medicare enrollee proportion. Recarey received US$781 million in Medicare payments for 197 000 enrollees but did not pay doctors and hospitals for their care. As of 2015 Recarey was a fugitive living in Spain. The IMC fraud was one of the largest in Medicare history.

== Early political career ==
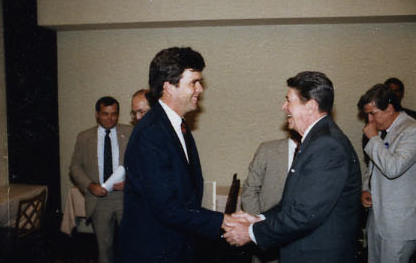
Bush greeting President Ronald Reagan in 1986

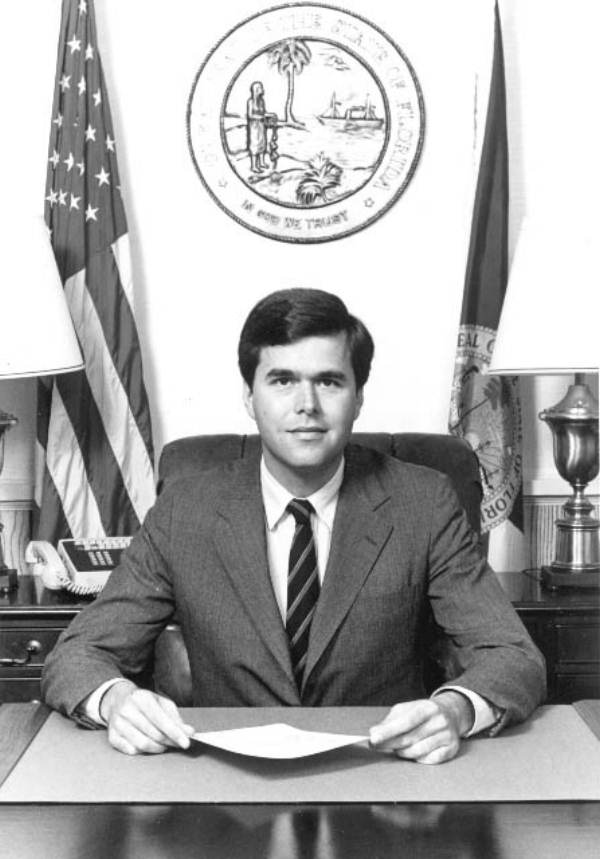
Bush as Florida Secretary of Commerce

Bush volunteered for his father's campaigns in 1980 and 1988. During the 1980 campaign, Bush worked as an unpaid volunteer, and expressed great admiration for his father. In 1984, Bush got his start in Florida politics by becoming the chairman of the Dade County Republican Party. Dade County played an important role in the 1986 election of Bob Martinez to the governor's office. Despite statewide Republican leaders urging Bush and other county party officials to stay neutral in the Republican primary, Bush endorsed Martinez ahead of the runoff of the primary. In appreciation of Bush's support during his campaign, Martinez appointed him as Florida's secretary of commerce. Bush served in that role from 1987 to 1988, before resigning to work on his father's presidential campaign.

Bush frequently communicated with his father's staff from 1981 through 1992. The younger Bush recommended Dexter Lehtinen for the post of U.S. attorney for the Southern District of Florida and set up a meeting between the Bush administration and Motorola. He also advocated for Cuban exiles living in South Florida, and supported the Cuban embargo. In 1990, Bush urged his father to pardon Orlando Bosch, a Cuban exile who had been convicted of firing a rocket into a Polish ship which was on passage to Cuba. Bosch was released from prison and granted residency in the U.S.

In 1989, Bush was the campaign manager of Ileana Ros-Lehtinen, the first Cuban-American to serve in Congress, in her special election.

== 1994 gubernatorial bid ==
In 1994, Bush launched an unsuccessful bid for the governor's office against incumbent Democratic governor Lawton Chiles. Bush ran that year as a conservative. At one point, he was asked what he would do for African Americans, and Bush responded: "It's time to strive for a society where there's equality of opportunity, not equality of results. So I'm going to answer your question by saying: probably nothing." Bush led through much of the campaign. Then with just a few weeks before election day, Bush ran a campaign ad featuring the mother of a 10-year-old girl who had been abducted and murdered many years before. The ad opened with pictures of the girl and then shifted to her mother who gave a description of her daughter's case and then said "Her killer is still on death row and we're still waiting for justice. We won't get it from Lawton Chiles because he's too liberal on crime. . . Lawton Chiles has let us down. . . I know Jeb Bush. He'll make criminals serve their sentences and enforce the death penalty. Lawton Chiles won't." The ad caused a storm of controversy. Florida prosecutors and former Supreme Court justices toured the state with Chiles saying that Bush didn't know what he was talking about. It was compared, including by a rankled Chiles, to the Willie Horton ad run on behalf of Bush's father in 1988. Bush further caused himself problems after being asked by reporters shortly after the ad started airing if signing death warrants immediately would have changed the outcome of the case by saying "No." With polls showing that voters had doubts about Bush's integrity, Chiles began pounding on the theme that Bush could not be trusted. In every commercial, no matter what the subject, Chiles ended with the tagline: "That's why we can't trust Jeb Bush with our future."

At the candidates last debate, the only one of the campaign held in prime time, moderator Tim Russert asked Bush how he could continue to justify running the ad that was "by your own admission, misleading." Bush responded that the ad was no longer being aired because it had "completed," but that he would have kept it on the air longer. He tried to justify running it by saying that Chiles was in his opinion, "liberal on crime," and hadn't yet acted on some other death warrants. Chiles said when it was his turn to respond that he had supported the death penalty all his life and that he had executed as many people as governor, eight, as the previous two administrations; that "as Governor, I hold the phone as they walk into the death chamber, I give the last command before they pull the switch." And then he said: "You put on this ad, Jeb. You knew it was false. You even admitted it was false. . . I'm ashamed that you would use the agony of a mother and the loss of her daughter in an ad like this. It's demagoguery, pure and simple. Every paper in the state has looked at that ad; everyone of them has said it is a new low. Your father had the record in the Willie Horton ad, but you've outdone that. And Jeb, I'll tell you how long you ran that ad, you ran that ad til' your polls started telling you you were taking a beating on it, and you still are taking a beating on it! It was a mistake, you shouldn't have done it," as whoops and applause rang out from Chiles partisans in the audience (incidentally, the girl in the ad's convicted killer would not be executed until 2013, during the administration of Governor Rick Scott).

Bush lost the election by only 63,940 votes out of 4,206,076 that were cast for the major party candidates (2,135,008; 51% to 2,071,068; 49%). In the same election year, his older brother, George, was elected Governor of Texas. Following his election loss, Bush joined the board of the Heritage Foundation and continued to work with Codina Partners. Alongside T. Willard Fair, the president of the Urban League's Miami affiliate, Bush helped to establish Florida's first charter school.

After the election Chiles admitted his campaign made scare calls in the final hours to senior citizens using phony organizations as fronts. The callers identified themselves as being from the nonexistent Citizens for Tax Fairness and falsely claimed that Tom Feeney, Bush's running mate, wanted to abolish Social Security and Medicare. Chiles maintained he did not find out about the calls until after the election.

== Governor of Florida ==
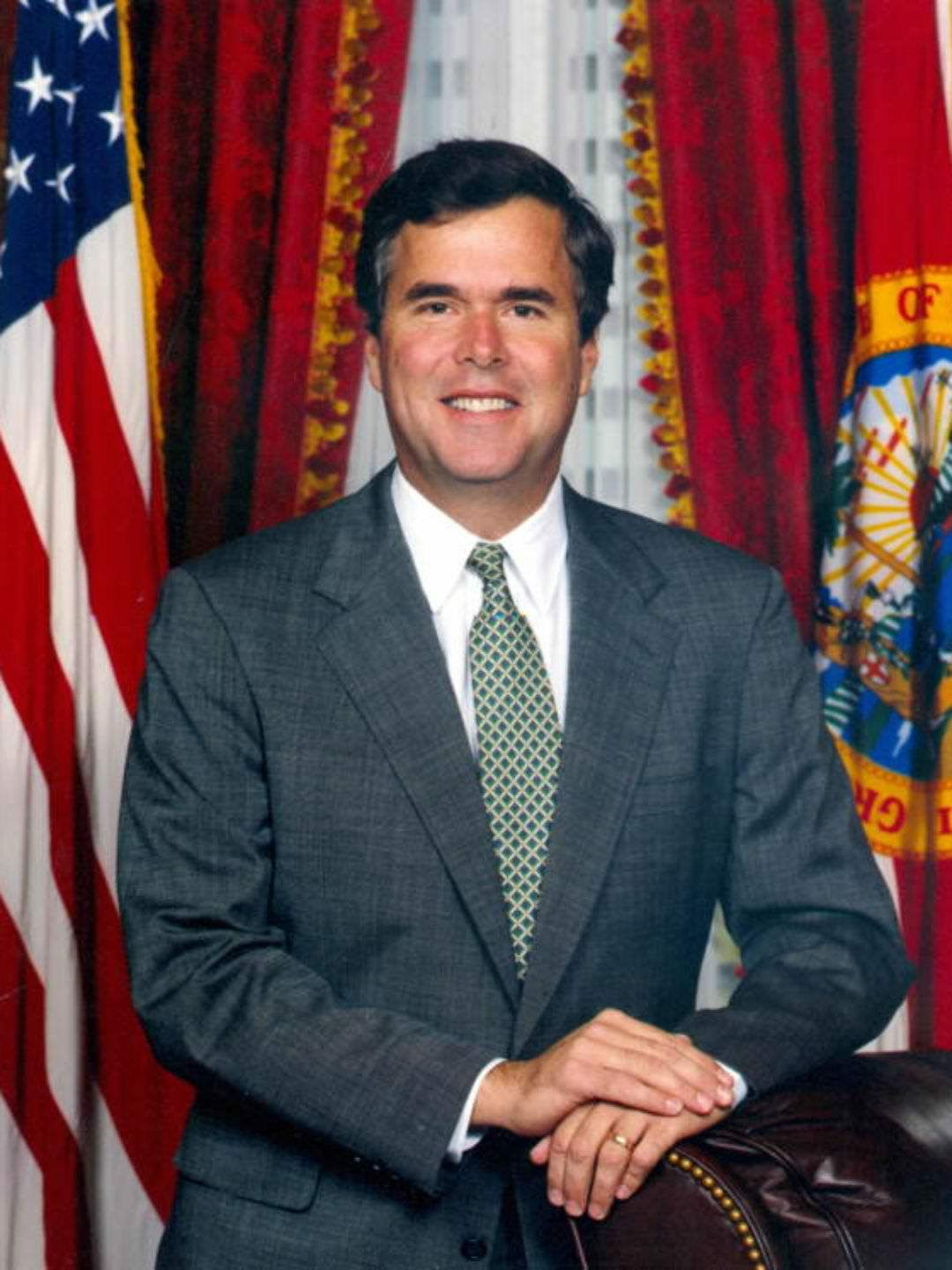
Official portrait, 1999

Bush ran again for governor in 1998, defeating Democrat Buddy MacKay, who was lieutenant governor. Bush ran for reelection in 2002 to become Florida's first two-term Republican governor. During his eight years as governor, Bush was credited with initiating environmental improvements, such as conservation in the Everglades, supporting caps for medical malpractice litigation, moving medicaid recipients to private systems, and instituting reforms to the state education system, including the issuance of vouchers and promoting school choice. Bush was governor when his brother George won an intensely fought election recount in Florida to become president. Bush recused himself from any official role in the recount.

=== 1998 election bid ===
In 1998, Bush defeated his Democratic opponent, Lieutenant Governor Buddy MacKay, by over 418,000 votes (2,191,105; 55% to 1,773,054; 45%) to become Governor of Florida. He campaigned as a "consensus-building pragmatist". Simultaneously, his brother, George W. Bush won a re-election victory for a second term as Governor of Texas, and they became the first siblings to govern two states simultaneously since Nelson and Winthrop Rockefeller governed New York and Arkansas from 1967 to 1971.

In the 1998 election, Bush garnered 61 percent of the Hispanic vote and 14 percent of the African American vote.

=== 2002 re-election bid ===
Bush was unopposed in the 2002 Republican gubernatorial primary, and in the general election he faced Democratic challenger Bill McBride. They met for two debates, in the most expensive Florida gubernatorial election yet. Voting went smoothly. Bush defeated McBride 56% to 43%, a greater margin of victory than in 1998.

Bush won 44 percent of the state's Jewish vote in the 2002 race. Bush also won the white female vote in the swing-voting battleground of Central Florida's I-4 corridor. However, he was not able to replicate the same success with African American voters (like he had earlier in 1998), winning only 8 percent of the African American vote. He became the first Republican governor of Florida to win re-election.

=== Tenure ===
==== Economic policy ====
While governor, Bush presided over a state government that reduced taxes by US$19 billion and he vetoed US$2 billion in new spending, according to The Wall Street Journal. An analysis conducted by economist Martin Sullivan, which eliminated the effects of the federal estate tax repeal (which did not require legislative action to go into effect) and inflation, estimated the cumulative reduction in taxes by the state at closer to US$13 billion during Bush's tenure, resulting in tax savings by 2006 of US$140 per person every year. A substantial amount of the tax savings in the higher estimate came from the phasing out of the federal estate tax law implemented in 2001 under President George W. Bush, for a total tax savings of US$848 million per year; Jeb Bush did not push for a replacement with a state tax. The biggest reduction in taxes was due to the elimination of the state's Intangible Personal Property Tax, which applied to holdings of stocks, bonds, mutual funds, and money market funds.

During Bush's tenure, the state also increased its reserves from US$1.3 billion to US$9.8 billion, which coincided with Florida receiving the highest possible bond rating for the first time. According to Kurt Wenner, VP of research at Florida Tax Watch, Bush was governor during one of the strongest revenue periods for the state of Florida, due in part to the boom in property values, so that revenue grew despite the tax cuts he implemented.

Bush reduced the state's government workforce by 11 percent. In May 2006, as part of a US$448.7 million line-item veto of state funding, he cut a total of US$5.8 million in grants to public libraries, pilot projects for library homework help and web-based high-school texts, and funding for a joint-use library in Tampa.

As Governor of Florida, Bush received grades of B in 2000, A in 2002, B in 2004, and C in 2006 from the Cato Institute, a libertarian think tank, in their biennial Fiscal Policy Report Card on America's governors.

==== Education policy ====
Bush's administration emphasized public education reform. His "A+ Plan" established heightened standards, required testing of all students, and graded all Florida schools. From 1998 to 2005, reading scores of 4th grade students in Florida on the National Assessment of Educational Progress increased 11 points, compared to 2.5 points nationally, according to the Maine Heritage Policy Center, a conservative think tank which opposes standardized testing.

Bush has been a proponent of school vouchers and charter schools, especially in areas of the state with failing public schools, although to date very few schools have received failing grades from the state. He established the McKay Scholarship Program which provides vouchers for students with learning disabilities to attend a school of their choice. He also established the A+ Opportunity Scholarship Program which provided vouchers to students. This program was struck down by the Florida Supreme Court in 2006.

Bush helped create the Corporate Income Tax Credit Scholarship which provides corporations with tax credits for donations to Scholarship Funding Organizations. Those organizations must spend 100% of the donations on scholarships for low income students.

Bush declined to raise taxes for education, which led him to oppose a ballot initiative to amend the Florida Constitution to cap growing school class sizes. Bush said he had "a couple of devious plans if this thing passes". Despite his opposition, the amendment passed.

In higher education, Bush approved three new medical schools during his tenure and also put forth the "One Florida" proposal, an initiative that had the effect of ending affirmative action admissions programs at state universities. These moves were among the concerns that led to the faculty of the University of Florida to deny Bush an honorary degree, while the University of Florida Alumni Association made him an honorary alumnus.

==== Health policy ====
As governor, Bush proposed and passed into law major reform to the medical liability system. The Florida Senate, a majority of which were Republican, opposed Bush's proposed caps on non-economic damages for injury and wrongful death. Bush insisted, and called the legislature into five special sessions. The contentious debate even included a senior Bush staffer calling for primary opposition to Republicans who disagreed with the Governor on the reforms. Eventually, the legislature agreed to the caps and Bush's reforms passed. In 2014, after Bush left office, the Florida Supreme Court ruled the damage cap – the "centerpiece" of the 2003 legislation that Bush had pushed for – to be a violation of the state Constitution's Equal Protection Clause, discriminating against "those who are most grievously injured, those who sustain the greatest damage and loss, and multiple claimants."

Bush passed a reform to Florida's Medicaid system that moved recipients into private managed care systems.

Bush was involved in the Terri Schiavo case, involving a woman with massive brain damage, who was on a feeding tube for over 15 years, and whose husband and legal guardian, Michael Schiavo, wished to remove the tube. This move was opposed by Terri Schiavo's parents in the courts. Bush signed "Terri's Law", legislation passed by the Florida legislature that authorized him, as governor, to keep Schiavo on life support. The law was ruled unconstitutional by the Florida Supreme Court on September 23, 2004. That decision was appealed to the federal courts. On January 24, 2005, the U.S. Supreme Court declined to hear the case, thus allowing the Florida court's ruling to stand.

While Governor of Florida, Bush was opposed to abortion. He supported a law requiring parental notification for teen abortions and requested that the courts appoint a guardian for the unborn child of a mentally disabled woman who had been raped. Choose Life, a pro-life advocacy group based in Ocala, Florida, submitted a specialty license plate application—previously vetoed by Governor Lawton Chiles—which passed both houses and was signed into law by Bush on June 8, 1999.

==== Other policies ====
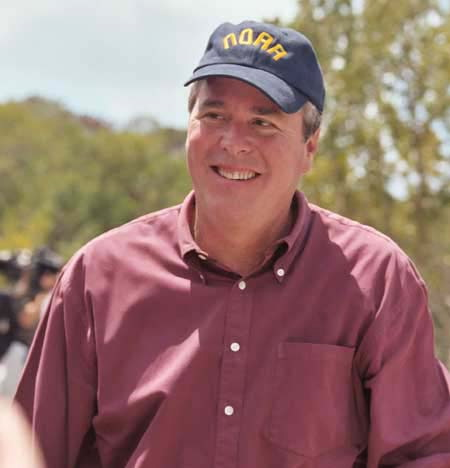
Bush at Rookery Bay participating in Earth Day activities in 2004

Bush signed legislation to restore the Everglades in 2000 as part of a US$8 billion project in conjunction with the federal government. He also set aside over one million acres of land for conservation as part of a land purchase program.

In 2001, Bush eliminated civil service protection for over 16,000 state jobs, which had the effect of making it easier to fire employees in those positions. In addition, he issued an executive order which removed racial preferences in state contracting.

In 2004, Bush supported an unsuccessful bill to allow illegal immigrants to be issued drivers licenses by the state.

Bush supported more than a dozen new protections for gun owners. In 2005, he signed into law Florida's stand-your-ground law, which was the first such state law in the United States.

Bush is an advocate of capital punishment and 21 prisoners were executed during his term. After the execution of Ángel Nieves Díaz was seemingly botched—it took 37 minutes to complete, and required a second injection of the lethal chemicals—he suspended all executions in Florida on December 15, 2006.

During Bush's tenure, the racial and gender diversity of the state's judicial bench increased. However, according to the Wall Street Journal, Democrats criticized some of Bush's judicial appointments as being "overtly partisan and political".

==== Veto of high-speed rail and other vetoes ====
Bush often used the line-item veto to limit state spending. He exercised his veto to stop other legislation as well (such as a bill about "parenting coordinators").

In 1995, the Florida state legislature created the High-Speed Rail Authority (HSRA) and came up with a public-private partnership model. Government would build the system leveraging state dollars with federal funds and tax-free bonding. The private sector was to invest money in the project, help design and build the network, and be given the franchise to operate the trains (known as design-build-operate-maintain, or DBOM). Trains would be privately owned, similar to how the airline industry operates in a publicly financed airport.

The rail system and its planning was estimated to cost $7–$8 billion. The Florida HSRA and the Florida Department of Transportation (FDOT) reached an agreement with a consortium that included the Fluor Corporation and Bombardier Transportation. The consortium agreed to invest $300 million and utilize the DBOM functionality. The state of Florida would float state bonds, and FDOT would commit $70 million annually (increasing three percent yearly to account for inflation) to service the bonds for the next thirty years. Federal monies would pay for the interest on the bonds, and the state monies would satisfy the principal. When the high-speed railroad was running, operating surpluses would also be applied to the debt.

The high-speed rail project nearly came to fruition until Bush became governor in 1999 and ended the project his second day in office, stating that the venture posed too much risk and cost for Florida taxpayers. State legislators reacted by adding the project on the 2000 ballot as a constitutional amendment which was ultimately passed by voters. The amendment directed Bush and legislature to start building the railroad system by 2003. Bush vetoed funding for both the project and the board, and led a high-profile campaign to repeal the constitutional requirement that mandated the construction of the high-speed system. Voters repealed the constitutional amendment. Many who voted believed they were supporting the train, though in fact a "yes" vote was to approve the repeal.

FDOT spokesperson Nazih Haddah commented that "the rhetoric was inflammatory and misleading. It was really exaggerating tactics that were used to defeat this. The financing and the project were sound. It really squandered a great opportunity for this state." Other public officials stated that Bush's underhanded tactics were emblematic of his willingness to protect moneyed interests – including developers, energy producers and highway builders – who opposed a shift toward mass transit and helped fund the repeal effort. "It's that arrogance of kind of the 1%," said Orlando transportation engineer Ian Lockwood.

==== Public opinion polling ====
According to The Miami Herald, Bush averaged a 58 percent job approval rating during his eight years in office. He left office with a high partisan gap in his ratings: 70 percent among Republicans and 32 percent among Democrats. He also appealed to a vast majority of independents: 66 percent of those voters graded his governorship in the A or B tier.

In a November 1999 polling survey by the Orlando Sentinel, Bush was rated "excellent or good" by 60 percent of Florida voters, rated "fair" by 26 percent of voters, and rated "poor" by ten percent of voters. In another polling survey by The Florida Voter in April 2000, Bush's overall ratings dropped to 54 percent of voters approving and 31 percent disapproving of his governorship. A Sun Sentinel survey in August placed Bush's approval rating at 57 percent and disapproval rating at 24 percent. In June 2001, the month Bush announced he would run for a second term, his approval rating remained steady in the mid-50s. In August, a Mason-Dixon Polling & Strategy survey saw Bush's approval rating fall to 49 percent, the first time during his tenure that a majority of voters did not approve of his governorship. According to a polling survey conducted by The Tampa Tribune in January 2002, Bush was rated "excellent or good" by 58 percent of voters, rated "fair" by 27 percent of voters, and rated "poor" by 14 percent of voters.

In a March 2002 Tampa Tribune polling survey, when voters were asked, "do you approve or disapprove the job Jeb Bush is doing as governor", 56 percent of voters said they approved of Bush's governorship, while 35 percent said they disapproved. A Mason-Dixon Polling & Strategy survey in June 2002 found Bush with a 62 percent approval rating. In a July poll by The Florida Voter, 52 percent of voters said they approved of Bush, a heavy decline from the previous month. In an October survey by The Tarrance Group, Bush garnered an approval rating of 57 percent going into his reelection bid. The results of the election were almost an exact match to the poll, with Bush receiving 56 percent of the vote. In a Sun Sentinel survey in June 2003, Bush was rated "excellent" by 14 percent of voters, rated "good" by 40 percent of voters, rated "fair" by 29 percent of voters, and rated "poor" by 9 percent of voters.

In an April 2004 survey by the Orlando Sentinel, Bush was rated "excellent or good" by 54 percent of voters, rated "fair" by 23 percent of voters, and rated "poor" by 23 percent of voters. In an August polling survey by SurveyUSA, Bush garnered a 56 percent approval rating. After the 2004 Atlantic hurricane season concluded, a Strategic Vision survey saw his approval rating jump to 61 percent. In another SurveyUSA survey in September 2005, Bush's approval rating declined to 53 percent. A Quinnipiac University polling survey conducted in November 2005 also concluded that Bush's approval rating was at 53 percent. In a March 2006 survey by Mason-Dixon Polling & Strategy, Bush was rated "excellent or good" by 63 percent of voters, rated "fair" by 21 percent of voters, and rated "poor" by 16 percent of voters. In October 2006, the St. Petersburg Times asked voters to grade Governor Bush by letter; in the poll 56 percent of voters graded Bush with an A or a B, 23 percent graded him with a C, 10 percent graded him with a D, and 7 percent graded him an F. In a November poll by Mason-Dixon Polling & Strategy, Bush's approval rating reached its highest ever at 64 percent.

== Post-governorship ==
=== Impact on political party ===
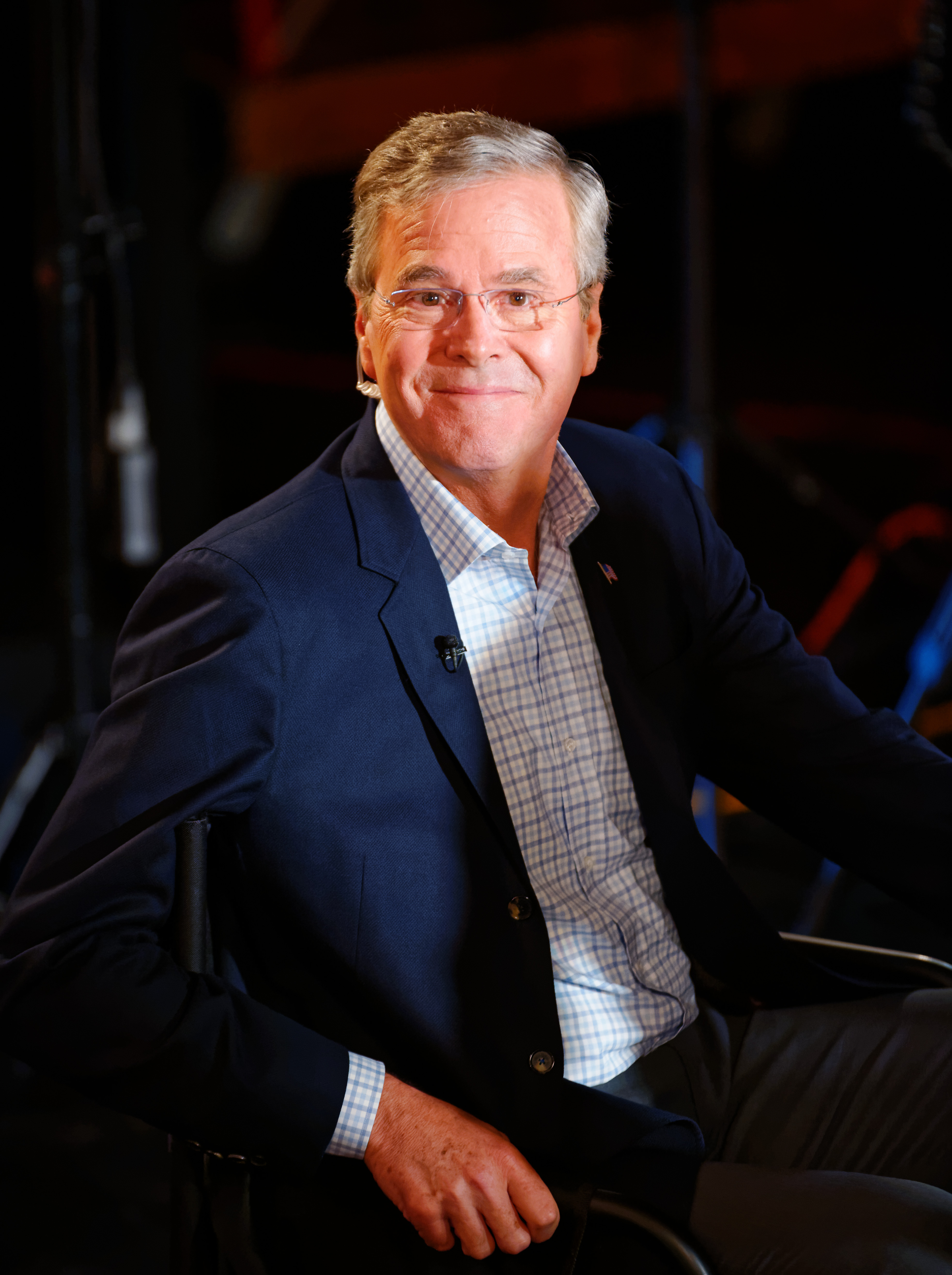
Bush in Derry, New Hampshire on June 16, 2015

According to political scientist Susan MacManus from the University of South Florida, "In Florida, [Bush is] still perceived as conservative, especially on fiscal issues and even on social issues."

Outside of Florida, fellow Republican leaders throughout the country have sought Bush's aid both on and off the campaign trail. Bush's out-of-state campaign visits include Kentucky, where Republican challenger Ernie Fletcher appeared with Bush and won that state's governorship in 2003, ending a 32-year streak of Democratic governors. In the first few months of 2014, Bush campaigned for New Mexico governor Susana Martinez, Nevada governor Brian Sandoval, Senator Lamar Alexander (Tenn.), and David Jolly who won a special congressional election in Florida.

Bush has been criticized by some in the Tea Party as not being sufficiently conservative, as he supports positions on immigration and Common Core that are unpopular with some conservatives. Bush publicly criticized the national Republican party for its adherence to "an orthodoxy that doesn't allow for disagreement" on June 11, 2012. In comments shared with Bloomberg View, Bush suggested that Ronald Reagan and his father would "have had a hard time" finding support in the contemporary GOP.

In October 2013, Bush called for passage of immigration reform. In April 2014, Bush said of illegal immigration: "It's an act of love. It's an act of commitment to your family. I honestly think that that is a different kind of crime. There should be a price paid, but it shouldn't rile people up that people are actually coming to this country to provide for their families."

=== Political interests ===
From 2004 to 2007, Bush served as a board member for the National Assessment Governing Board (NAGB). Created by Congress, the board's purpose is to establish policy on reports examining K-12 students' academic progress in America's public and private schools. Since then Bush's education foundation has advocated for the Common Core State Standards Initiative. In October 2013, referring to opponents of the standards, Bush said that while "criticisms and conspiracy theories are easy attention grabbers", he instead wanted to hear their solutions to the problems in American education.

In May 2006, Bush was approached to become the next commissioner of the National Football League. The outgoing commissioner, Paul Tagliabue, was searching for replacements. In response, Bush said on May 24, 2006, that "I'm Governor of the state of Florida and I intend to be Governor until I leave—which is January 2007." Roger Goodell eventually became the new NFL commissioner.

In September 2024, Bush was one of several former governors to sign an open letter to all 50 current governors urging them to certify their states’ votes after the upcoming November election.

=== Business activities ===
According to Fox Business, Bush earned nearly half of the US$29 million he earned between 2007 and when he decided to run for Republican presidential nomination in December 2014, from Wall Street banks and companies. In April 2007, Bush joined Tenet Healthcare's board of directors. The following August, Bush joined investment bank, Lehman Brothers, as an adviser in its private equity group. Bush has also served on the board of InnoVida, Swisher Hygiene, and Rayonier and has served as an adviser to Barclays. Bush would later return US$270,000 in consultancy fees he had been paid by InnoVida after they declared bankruptcy.

As of 2014, Bush had received more than US$2 million from his work for Tenet, a company that expected to receive US$100 million in new earnings in 2014 because of the Patient Protection and Affordable Care Act (ACA) and that "aggressively encouraged Americans to sign up for insurance under the program...." Bush has reportedly objected to the ACA at company meetings, but has kept his personal views separate from what is best for Tenet. Bush owns several international stocks.

== 2016 presidential campaign ==
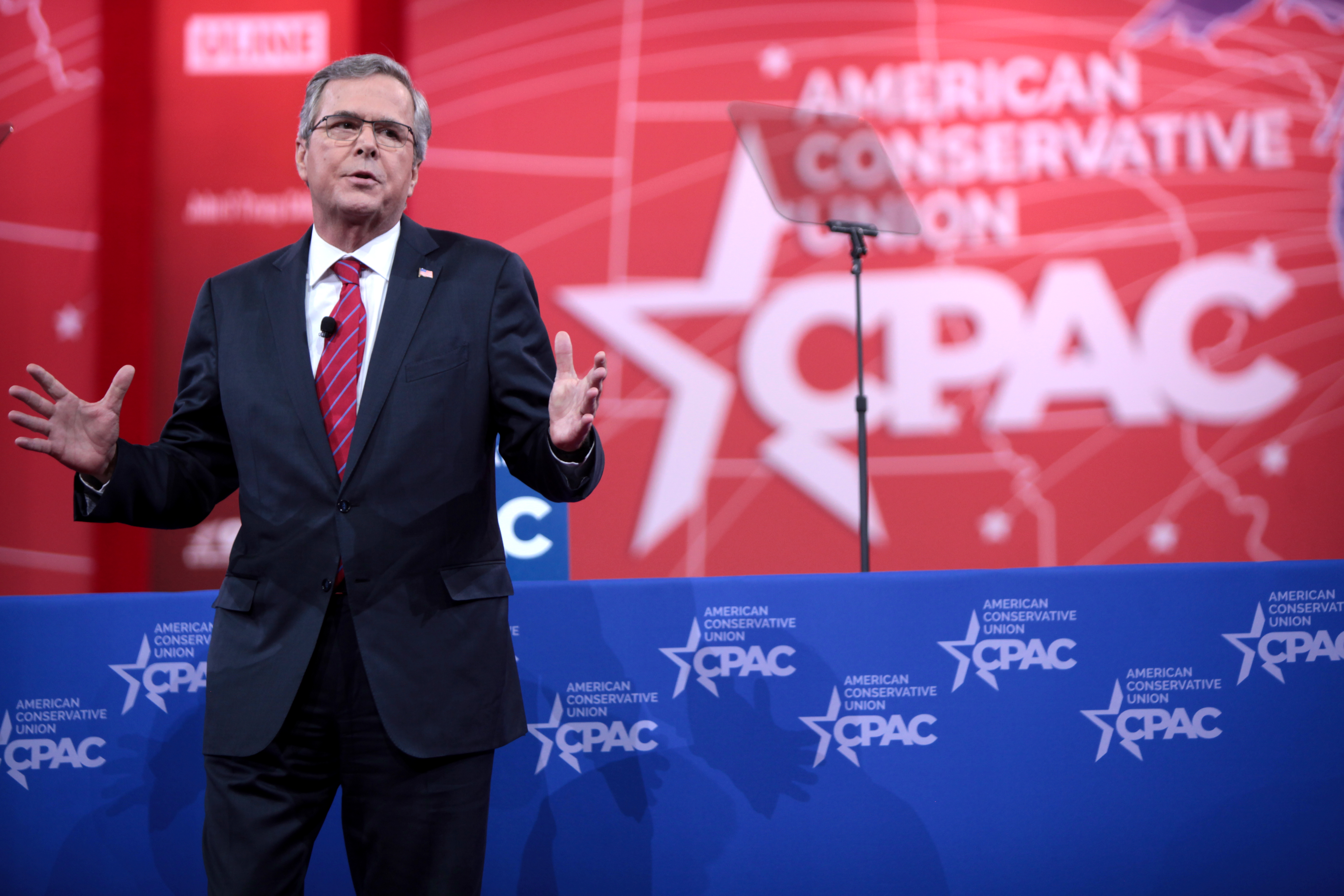
Bush speaking at CPAC in Washington D.C., 2015

Bush had been considered a potential candidate in the 2016 presidential election since the end of the 2012 election. On October 2, 2014, George W. Bush said that his brother "wants to be President". On December 16, 2014, Bush announced via Facebook that he would be "actively exploring" a 2016 run to become President of the United States and at the end of the year resigned from several corporate boards.

In February 2015, Bush released several thousand emails from his time as governor online. Most of the emails are in the public record under Florida's Sunshine Laws. However, Bush created controversy by releasing some emails that included some personal details such as social security numbers, names, and addresses, as well as the contents of the messages. Bush's campaign team subsequently redacted the personal information.

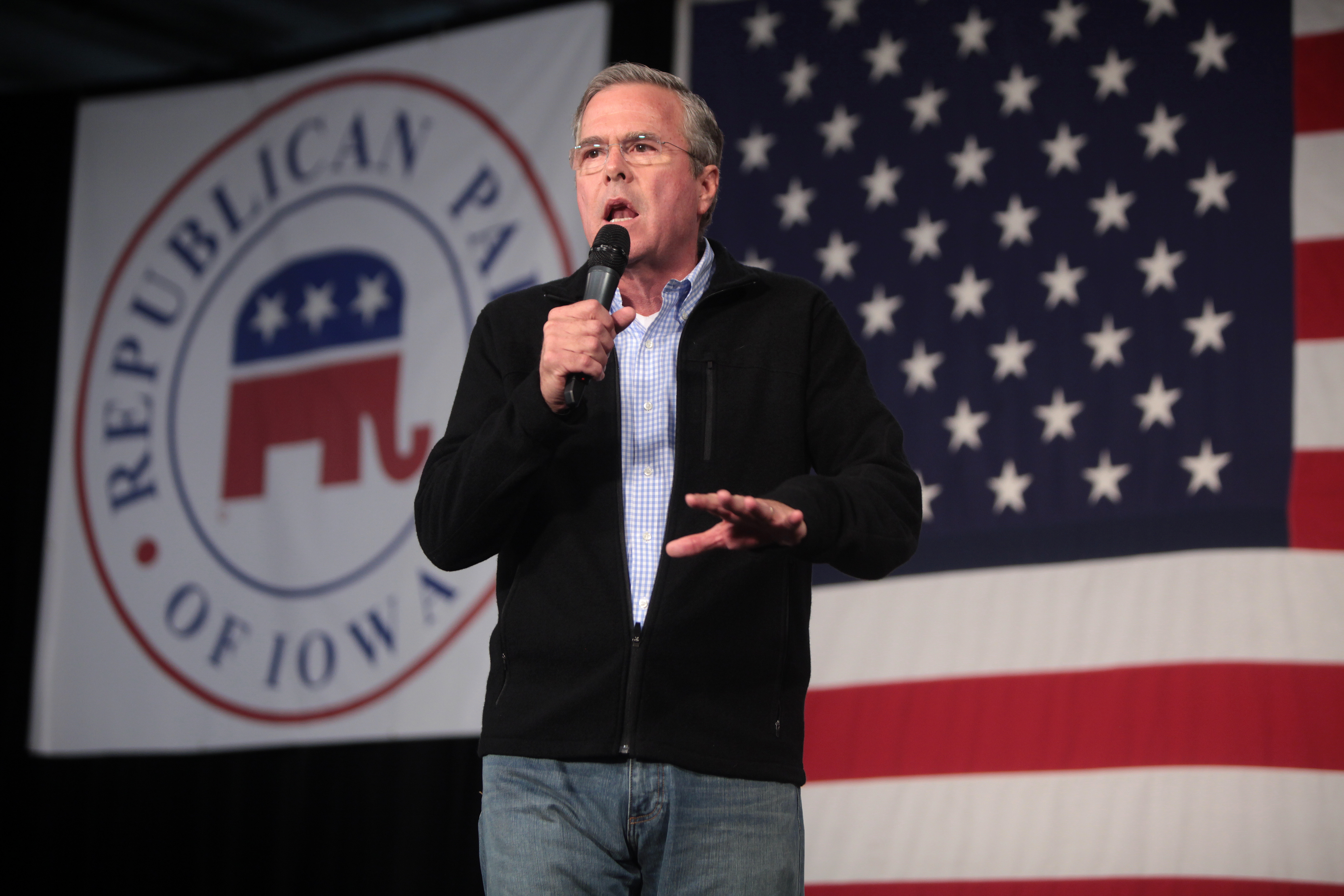
Bush speaking in Iowa, 2016

By extending the exploration mode of his potential candidacy to a six-month period (his scheduled announcement came one day short of six months into his exploratory phase), Bush used his time to get acquainted with the press, court donors, and prepare a strategy. In doing this, he navigated several campaign finance laws which limit donations and prohibit coordination with Super PACs. This included delaying his official announcement to run, in order to circumvent the cap on primary donations of $2,700 per individual. In May 2015, it was reported that Bush had been raising money since January 2015, estimated to be close to US$100 million, for his super PAC, Right to Rise.

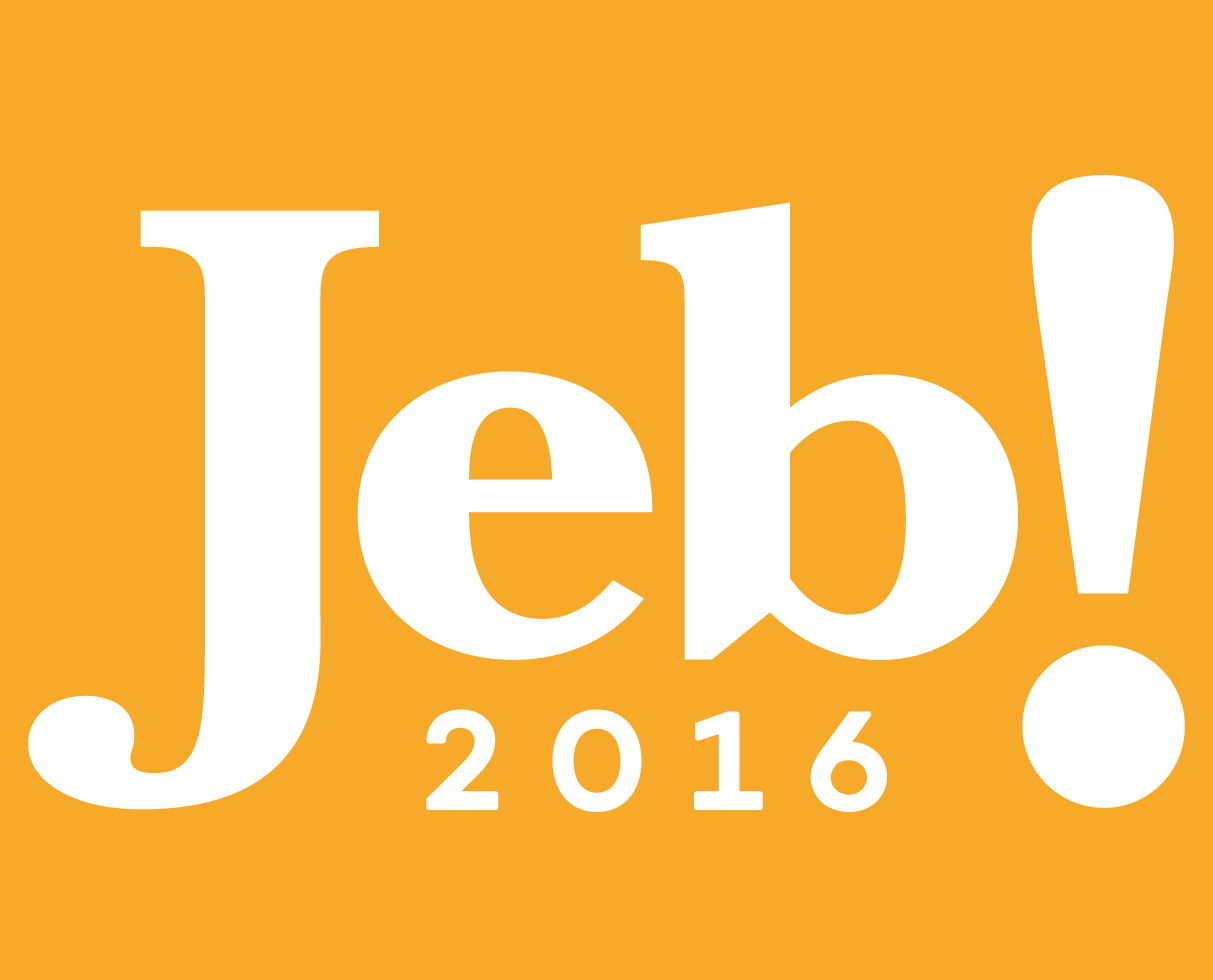
Bush's campaign logo

Bush announced his candidacy on June 15, 2015, at a multicultural campus of Miami Dade College. According to Reuters, Bush characterized himself as a moderate Republican who still has conservative principles; he promised immigration reform, spoke fluent Spanish, mentioned his wife's Mexican origins, and criticized Hillary Clinton. David Yepsen, director of the Paul Simon Public Policy Institute, said: "It's pretty hard for [Republicans] to win the White House if current Hispanic voting trends continue. (Bush) has some unique abilities to appeal to those voters and he's going to maximize them."

After a series of poor results in Iowa and New Hampshire, Bush spent his remaining money and campaign effort on the South Carolina primary. He placed fourth with under 8% of the vote. That night, Bush suspended his campaign, ending his presidential bid, and subsequently endorsed Texas senator Ted Cruz. In an analysis of what went wrong, Politico argues: "His slow, awkward stumble from August through October encapsulates everything that caused the operation viewed as 'Jeb!, Inc.' to fail. Bush was on the wrong side of the most galvanizing issues for Republican primary voters, he himself was a rusty and maladroit campaigner and his campaign was riven by internal disagreements and a crippling fear that left them paralyzed and unable to react to Trump." In May 2016, Bush announced he would vote neither for Trump nor Clinton.

== Political positions ==
Bush has addressed myriad political issues over the course of his career, many of them during his governorship. In conjunction with his 2015 bid for the presidency, he has revisited many issues that he addressed before, as well as discussing many new ones.

=== Domestic issues ===
Bush believes abortions should only be legal in the case of rape or incest or if the life of the mother is in danger. He does not support public funding for abortion clinics.

Bush generally rejects the scientific consensus on climate change, which is that climate change is real, progressing, dangerous, and primarily caused by human activity. While he has stated that "I think global warming may be real", he has claimed that "it is not unanimous among scientists that it is disproportionately manmade", and said that "What I get a little tired of on the left is this idea that somehow science has decided all this so you can't have a view." National Journal wrote that Bush "does not acknowledge the scientific consensus that human activity drives climate change".

Bush favors repealing the Patient Protection and Affordable Care Act (ACA or "Obamacare") and replacing it with a "market-oriented" alternative. Bush has called the current law a "monstrosity", saying that it is "flawed to its core". Bush has proposed some sort of state- or local-government funded "catastrophic coverage" system, in which "if you have a hardship that goes way beyond your means of paying for it, ... the government is there or an entity is there to help you deal with that." After the U.S. Supreme Court upheld the ACA in King v. Burwell in June 2015, Bush stated that the decision was "not the end of the fight" against the law.

In 2015, Bush took the position that people in the United States illegally should have a path to legal status, but not a path to citizenship, and said that legal status and avoiding deportation should require immigrants to pay fines, get work permits, pay taxes, not receive government assistance, learn English, and not commit crimes. He supports tougher enforcement of immigration laws, including prosecution of businesses that try to hire illegal aliens.

Bush, an opponent of same-sex marriage, disagreed with the Obergefell v. Hodges Supreme Court decision, and believes that the issue should be decided by the states rather than by the federal government and that it is not a constitutional right. He holds that businesses should have the right to refuse to provide services for same-sex weddings on religious grounds. In July 2015, Bush said he supported lifting the military's ban on allowing transgender people to openly serve in the military, so long as "the military's comfortable with this" and it did not impact morale.

Overall, Bush is for expanding gun owners' rights. As Governor, Bush adopted a "tough on crime" approach. In the 1998 gubernatorial election, he ran on a 10-20-life platform which imposed stronger mandatory minimum sentences for individuals who used guns in crimes. Bush is a supporter of the death penalty. In his unsuccessful 1994 campaign for Florida governor, Bush promised to sign many more death warrants as governor. One of the "central themes" of Bush's 1994 campaign was his proposal to shorten the appeals period in capital cases. During Bush's term as governor, some 21 prisoners were executed. In 2015, Bush said he was conflicted about the death penalty. In his 1994 campaign, Bush proposed publishing the names of juvenile delinquents so the public would "know who the thugs are in their neighborhoods." In 2002, Bush opposed a Florida ballot measure that would have allowed nonviolent drug offenders to enter treatment programs instead of prison. Bush's then-24-year-old daughter had been arrested the same year on drug-related charges and underwent treatment.

Bush admitted smoking marijuana in his teenage years. "Forty years ago I smoked marijuana and I admitted it," said Bush. "I'm sure other people did it and didn't want to admit it in front of 40 million people." He also agreed that his decision to take marijuana was "stupid" and "wrong." Bush believes each state should be allowed to decide whether it is appropriate to legalize marijuana or not. Bush opposes net neutrality. In September 2020, Bush told The Carlos Watson Show that he was interested in the concept of a universal basic income, as popularized by 2020 Democratic presidential candidate Andrew Yang.

=== Economic issues ===
Bush supports a decrease in capital gains taxes and property taxes. He supports cutting taxes for all Americans and believes they do better with less government interference. Bush also is a supporter of welfare restrictions. He supports the following: a four-year limit of benefits, a requirement that able-bodied recipients participate in work-related activities in order to receive benefits, and limiting benefits given to recipients if they have additional children while on welfare.

Bush favors gradually raising the retirement age (i.e., the age for collecting Social Security retirement benefits) from 65 to 68 or 70.

Bush is a frequent critic of the Consumer Financial Protection Bureau and the Dodd–Frank Wall Street Reform and Consumer Protection Act of 2010.

=== International relations and security ===
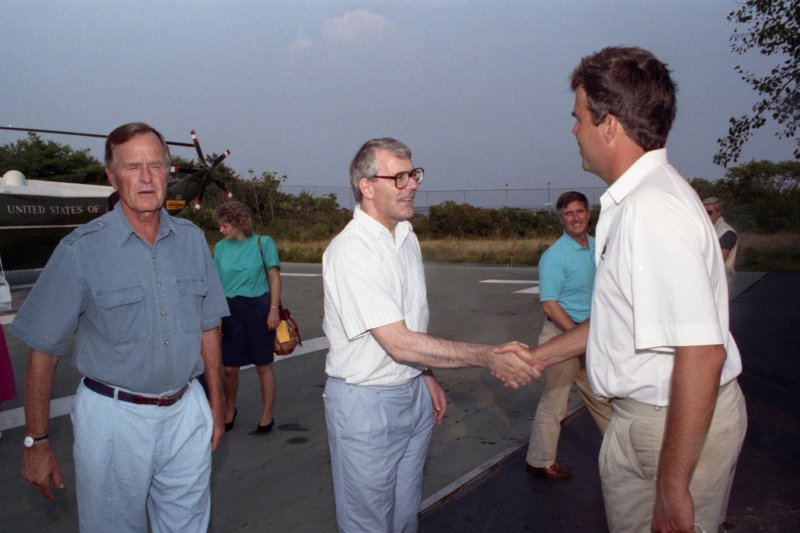
Bush greeting British prime minister John Major in 1991, along with his father, President George H. W. Bush

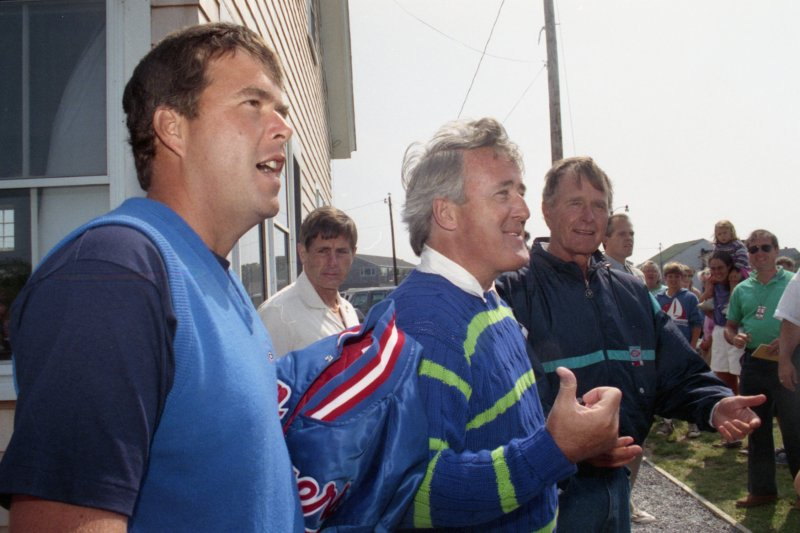
Bush greeting Canadian prime minister Brian Mulroney in 1991, along with his father, President George H. W. Bush

In May 2015, Bush stated that he would have ordered the 2003 invasion of Iraq had he been president at the time: "I would have [authorized the invasion], and so would have Hillary Clinton, just to remind everybody. And so would almost everybody that was confronted with the intelligence they got." He also indicated that the lack of focus on post-invasion security was a mistake. He later stated that "knowing what we know now, ...I would not have engaged". "I would not have gone into Iraq", he said. He also argued that the invasion—though perhaps inspired by faulty intelligence—had been beneficial, saying the world was "significantly safer" without Saddam Hussein in power.

In 2015, Bush said that he does not support a further major commitment of U.S. troops in Iraq to fight the Islamic State of Iraq and the Levant (ISIS or ISIL), saying that such a deployment is not needed to defeat ISIS. He has not, however, ruled out such a deployment in the future. Bush favors building a new U.S. base in Iraq's al-Anbar province, and has said that some U.S. troops ought to be embedded with Iraqi armed forces to help train them and identify targets as joint terminal attack controllers (JTACs). Bush has not commented on adding to the approximately 3,500 U.S. troops in Iraq now.

In a speech, Bush said his brother, former president George W. Bush, was his main adviser on policy with the Middle East. Bush later clarified that he was referring to policy on Israel, rather than on the Middle East as a whole.

Bush supports the continued collection of metadata of phone calls by the National Security Agency. He also supports the USA Patriot Act, and criticized efforts by Senator Rand Paul and others to stop its reauthorization. Bush stated that Paul was "wrong" about the Patriot Act and stated that: "The Patriot Act has kept us safe, plain and simple. The metadata program has kept us safe, plain and simple. There's been no violation of civil liberties."

Bush has called for increased military spending, expressing the belief that 2.5% of GDP is an insufficient amount.

Bush has called the April 2015 Iran nuclear deal framework a "horrific deal" and said he would likely terminate any final agreement should he become president. He has argued that the deal would put Iran into a position where it could intimidate the Middle East. Bush condemned the July 2015 final nuclear agreement between Iran and the P5+1 world powers, calling it "appeasement." However, Bush stated that he would not seek to revoke the agreement on his first day in office.

Bush supported President Donald Trump's decision to recognize Jerusalem as Israel's capital. He tweeted: "Jerusalem is the capital of Israel and I applaud @POTUS for seeing through America's promise to relocate its embassy there. This is an important show of solidarity with Israel, one of our nation's greatest allies."

== Civic and charitable activities ==
After losing a 1994 election for Governor of Florida against Lawton Chiles, Bush pursued policy and charitable interests. He "volunteered time to assist the Miami Children's Hospital, the United Way of Dade County and the Dade County Homeless Trust".

Bush served from 2012 to 2015 as co-chair of the Barbara Bush Foundation for Family Literacy. He has also worked with The James Madison Institute (JMI), a free market public policy think tank based in Tallahassee, Florida. He helped the institute in numerous ways and still has his think tank working in conjunction with it. In June 2008, Bush's Foundation for Excellence in Education partnered with JMI to hold a summit called Excellence in Action: A National Summit on Education Reform.

In 1996, The Foundation For Florida's Future published a book that Bush had co-written, Profiles in Character (ISBN 0-9650912-0-1), a clear parallel to John F. Kennedy's 1955 book Profiles in Courage. The foundation also published and distributed policy papers, such as "A New Lease on Learning: Florida's First Charter School", which Bush co-wrote. Bush subsequently wrote the foreword to another book, published by the conservative Heritage Foundation and written by Nina Shokraii Rees, School Choice 2000: What's Happening in the States (ISBN 0-89195-089-3).

Bush co-founded the first charter school in the State of Florida: Liberty City Charter School, a grades K-6 elementary school. in a Miami neighborhood that, in 1980, was the site of the first major race riot since the Civil Rights era. The school's co-founder, working alongside Bush, was T. Willard Fair, a local black activist and head of the Greater Miami Urban League. The Liberty City Charter School was closed in 2008 after falling more than US$1 million in debt.

In 2000, Bush established the Points of Light program to recognize an "exemplary volunteer, organization, or person".

Bush is the honorary chairman of the Annual AT&T Jeb Bush Florida Golf Classic, a fundraiser that benefits the Cystic Fibrosis Foundation. He first became involved in the benefit after meeting with committee member Lawson Dutton, whose child suffered from cystic fibrosis. Supporters raised more than US$722,000 in 2014 at the 19th annual Jeb Bush Florida Classic, exceeding their goals in attendance and revenues raised. Since the event's inception 19 years ago, the total revenue netted has reached over US$7.478 million.

== Personal life ==
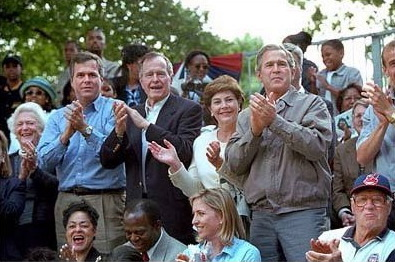
Bush with his family, June 2001

In the city of León, Mexico, where he was teaching English during 1970 as part of a foreign exchange program, Bush met Columba Garnica Gallo. They were married on February 23, 1974, in Austin, Texas. As of 2014, the family residence is in Coral Gables, Florida. Bush is fluent in Spanish.

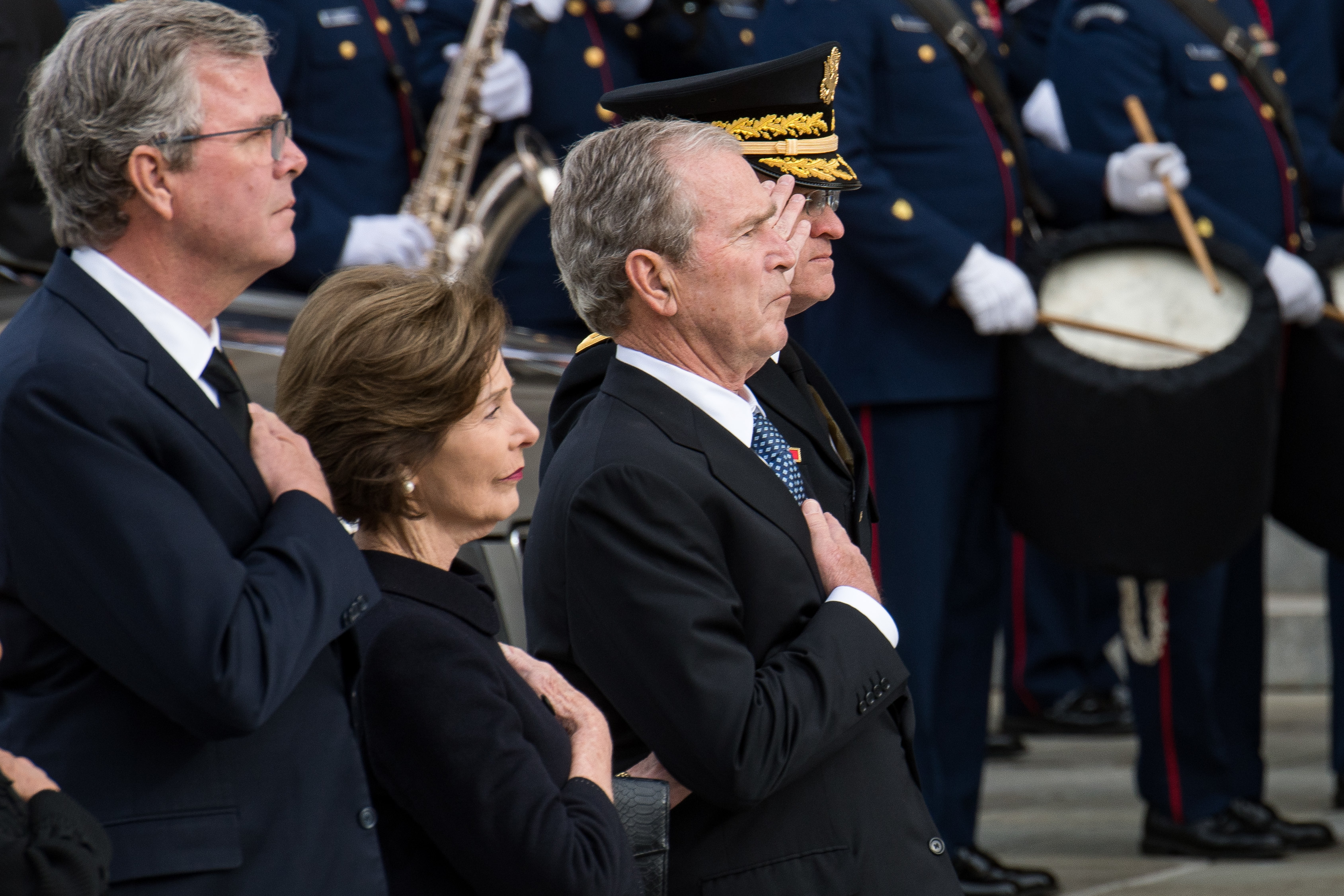
Bush at the state funeral for his father in December 2018

The Bushes have three children: George Prescott (born April 24, 1976, in Texas), went to Gulliver Preparatory School, studied at Rice University, and earned a Juris Doctor degree from the University of Texas School of Law. In the 2014 election, he was elected Commissioner of the Texas General Land Office. Noelle Lucila Bush (born 1977) is his only daughter. In November 2015, while campaigning in New Hampshire, Bush detailed Noelle's struggles with drug abuse. His other son, Jeb Bush Jr. (born 1983), who attended Bolles School, works for a Miami commercial real estate firm. Bush has four grandchildren, two through his elder son, and two through his younger son.

In 1995, Bush converted from Episcopalianism to Catholicism. In 2004, he became a Fourth Degree Knight of Columbus. Bush, a member of Father Hugon Council 3521 in Tallahassee, has joined the Father Hugon Assembly.

In April 2018, upon his mother Barbara Bush's death, Bush delivered a eulogy on behalf of the family at her funeral.

== Electoral history ==
1994 Florida gubernatorial election
Party	Candidate	Votes	%
Democratic	Lawton Chiles (incumbent)	2,135,008	50.75%
Republican	Jeb Bush	2,071,068	49.23%
Write-in		583	0.0%
Majority		63,940	1.52%
Turnout		4,206,659	
Democratic hold			

1998 Florida gubernatorial election
Party	Candidate	Votes	%
Republican	Jeb Bush	2,191,105	55.27%
Democratic	Buddy MacKay	1,773,054	44.72%
Write-in		282	0.01%
Total votes		3,964,441	100.00%
Republican gain from Democratic			

2002 Florida gubernatorial election
Party	Candidate	Votes	%
Republican	Jeb Bush (incumbent)	2,856,845	56.0
Democratic	Bill McBride	2,201,427	43.2
No Party Affiliation	Bob Kunst	42,039	0.8
Write-ins		270	0.01
Majority		655,418	12.8
Turnout		5,100,581	54.8
Republican hold			

Cumulative results of the 2016 Republican Party presidential primaries
Party	Candidate	Votes	%
Republican	Donald Trump	14,015,993	44.95%
Republican	Ted Cruz	7,822,100	25.08%
Republican	John Kasich	4,290,448	13.76%
Republican	Marco Rubio	3,515,576	11.27%
Republican	Ben Carson	857,039	2.75%
Republican	Jeb Bush	286,694	0.92%
Republican	Rand Paul	66,788	0.21%
Republican	Mike Huckabee	51,450	0.16%
Republican	Carly Fiorina	40,666	0.13%
Republican	Chris Christie	57,637	0.18%
Republican	Jim Gilmore	18,369	0.06%
Republican	Rick Santorum	16,627	0.05%

2016 Republican National Convention delegate count
Party	Candidate	Votes	%
Republican	Donald Trump	1,441	58.3%
Republican	Ted Cruz	551	22.3%
Republican	Marco Rubio	173	7.0%
Republican	John Kasich	161	6.5%
Republican	Ben Carson	9	0.4%
Republican	Jeb Bush	4	0.2%
Republican	Rand Paul	1	<0.01%
Republican	Mike Huckabee	1	<0.01%
Republican	Carly Fiorina	1	<0.01%

Party political offices
Preceded by Bob Martinez	Republican nominee for Governor of Florida; 1994, 1998, 2002	Succeeded by Charlie Crist
Political offices
Preceded by Buddy MacKay	Governor of Florida; 1999–2007	Succeeded by Charlie Crist
U.S. order of precedence (ceremonial)
Preceded by Bob Martinez as Former Governor	Order of precedence of the United States	Succeeded by Charlie Crist as Former Governor
