= Gissendanner =

Gissendanner is a surname. Notable people with the surname include:

- Elton Gissendanner (1927–2023), American politician
- Kamela Gissendanner (born 1985), American basketball player
