= Ralph Haben =

American attorney, lobbyist and politician (1941–2026)

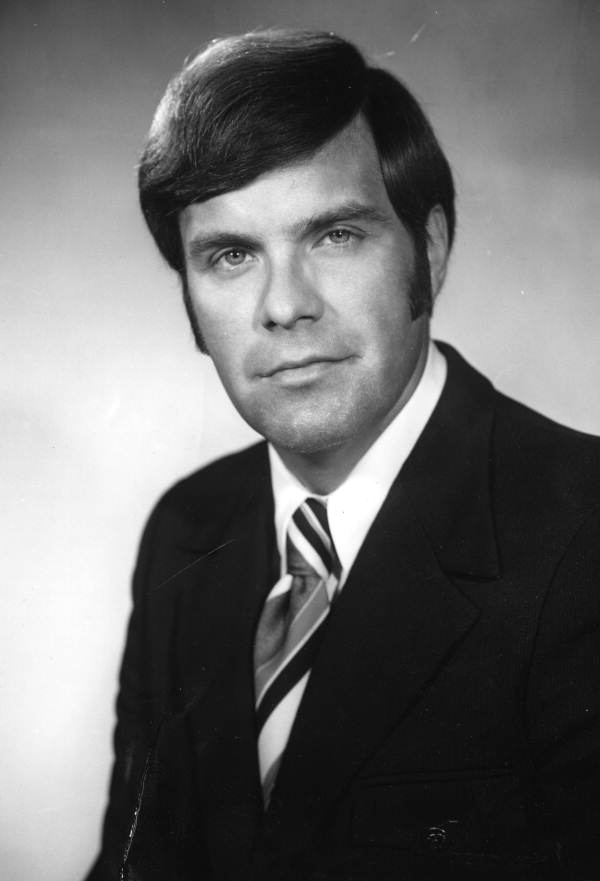
- Haben's official House portrait, 1982

Speaker of the Florida House of Representatives
- In office 1980–1982
- Preceded by: J. Hyatt Brown
- Succeeded by: H. Lee Moffitt

Member of the Florida House of Representatives from the 71st district
- In office 1972–1982
- Preceded by: Jack Shreve
- Succeeded by: Fred Burrall

Personal details
- Born: Ralph Harris Haben Jr. November 25, 1941 Atlanta, Georgia, U.S.
- Died: June 13, 2026 (aged 84)
- Party: Democratic
- Education: University of Florida (B.A.); Cumberland School of Law (J.D.)
- Profession: Attorney, lobbyist

Ralph Harris Haben Jr. (November 25, 1941 – June 13, 2026) was an American attorney, lobbyist, and politician who served as the Speaker of the Florida House of Representatives from 1980 to 1982. Haben graduated from the University of Florida in 1964 and Cumberland School of Law in 1967, and began working as a government prosecutor, first for the city of Palmetto, Florida, and then for the Twelfth Judicial Circuit Court of Florida. He eventually became a judge before running for the Florida House of Representatives in 1972. In the House, he served on numerous committees, including the Criminal Justice Committee, and eventually became Speaker. He left the legislature to run for Florida Comptroller in 1982, but lost the only election in his electoral history. He briefly considered a run for Governor of Florida, but decided instead to become a lobbyist for many large interests in the state legislature.

Haben was known as a fairly conservative Democrat who focused on criminal issues; his tenure included multiple attempts to increase the penalties on criminals and create new task forces and funding to combat organized and violent crime. He also sought several tax increases to help pay for transportation costs and opposed both the state Sunshine Amendment requiring that politicians disclose their financial assets and the Equal Rights Amendment.

== Background ==
Haben was born in Atlanta, Georgia, on November 25, 1941. Haben graduated from Palmetto High School in Palmetto, Florida. He went on to earn an Education degree from the University of Florida in 1964, where he was a member of Phi Delta Theta. In 1967, he received his Juris Doctor from Cumberland School of Law, where he was a member of Phi Delta Phi.

He served in the National Guard of the United States. He was an outdoorsman, and his hobbies include fishing, skiing, and tennis. He also often piloted his small plane. He was a member of the Kiwanis organization and the Benevolent and Protective Order of Elks. He nearly died from a serious case of hashimoto's thyroiditis in 1991, but was stabilized at Shands at the University of Florida. This was the fourth time he nearly died, following a black widow bite, the sinking of a boat 12 miles offshore, and a plane crash.

Haben died on June 13, 2026, at the age of 84.

== Legal career ==
For the majority of his legal career, Haben served as a government prosecutor. He was City Prosecutor for Palmetto, Florida, and then Assistant State Prosecutor for the Twelfth Judicial Circuit Court of Florida. He later became a judge for the Palmetto and Anna Maria, Florida, area. He left the bench and opened a private practice that he continued to operate while in the Florida legislature.

== Political career ==
Haben was first elected to the Florida House of Representatives in 1972. He represented the 71st district, which encompassed parts of Manatee County, Hardee County, and three precincts of Sarasota County. He received numerous awards during his tenure, including 1977 Unified Sportsmen outstanding legislator of the year, 1979 Academy of Florida Trial Lawyers Outstanding Legislative Contribution, 1976 Florida Sheriffs Association Distinguished Service Award for Law Enforcement, and 1980 University of Florida Outstanding Alumnus.

=== Speaker of the House ===
Haben ran for the 1980 through 1982 Speakership in 1978. At first, he had an opponent for the position, but won his bid when the other candidate Franklin Mann dropped out of the race.

=== Committees ===
Haben served as the chairman of the House Criminal Justice Committee; when he first began, he was the youngest committee chair in the House at 35. He also chaired the Subcommittee on Banks and Banking, as well as serving on the Finance and Taxation, Tourism and Economic Development, and Transportation and Commerce Committees.

=== Electoral history ===
Haben was first elected to the House in 1972. That year, he defeated Floyd Price in the Democratic primary, and Republican Don Miller, Jr. in the general election. He was re-elected without opposition in 1974 and 1976. He only ever lost one election, when he tried to unseat incumbent Democrat Florida Comptroller Gerald Lewis in 1982. At the time, it was the most expensive Florida Cabinet race ever run, with over $1.7 million spent.

He had hoped to use the position as a stepping stone to the position of Governor of Florida; he considered taking on many different incumbents, but decided on Lewis, believing him vulnerable. He also briefly considered a run for United States Congress and also a switch to the Republican Party to run for their gubernatorial nomination. He briefly considered running for governor in the 1986 election, but eventually decided not to.

== Lobbyist ==
While in office, Haben fought attempts at lobbying reform pushed by advocacy groups. After leaving elected office, Haben became a business lobbyist for a number of interests. These include the Day Cruise Association, a gambling cruise ship company, the Florida Cable Telecommunications Association, the H. Lee Moffitt Cancer Center & Research Institute, and Alamo Rent a Car. He helped the cruise ship casinos oppose allowing the expansion of gaming by the Seminole Tribe, which they viewed as competition. He ran a firm named Pennington & Haben, which lobbied for bills from both major parties, and ran the mediation company Ralph Haben & Associates.

== Political views ==
=== Crime and gun control ===
Haben was seen as a fairly conservative Democrat who built his career on "law-and-order" issues. He supported the establishment of a permanent anti-organized crime commission to handle rises in mob-related crime in the state. While chairing the Criminal Justice Committee, Haben pushed two pieces of legislation that allowed police officers to shoot fleeing subjects and gave those who carried a gun while committing a crime a mandatory three-year sentence. Haben argued against nearly all forms of gun control, and specifically opposed a bill that would have made it illegal to own inexpensive guns, commonly known as saturday night special.

=== Taxes ===
In 1980, Haben called the legislature into special session to increase transportation taxes. In particular, he advocated raising the fuel tax by removing certain exemptions, citing the need caused by decreased gasoline consumption and the increasing cost of building roads. However, President of the Florida Senate Wyon Childers blocked the special session. He pushed strongly for a measure to increase the state sales tax from 4 cents on the dollar to 5 cents on the dollar.

=== Sunshine Amendment ===
The Sunshine Amendment to the Florida Constitution requires all elected officials and candidates for public office to disclose their private assets in a government form available to the public. Haben was highly against the Sunshine Amendment, calling financial disclosure laws the "greatest fraud ever perpetrated on the people of Florida." He felt that the amendment was an unconstitutional invasion of his privacy, and that it did little to inform voters on who would be a good and honest elected official.

=== Legislative pay ===
When the legislature sought to increase their pay in the 1970s, Haben opposed the efforts. While he believed that legislatures deserved a pay increase, he feared that raising the salary would attract career politicians who would treat the position as a job, leading to less diversity in the House. This, he claimed, would move the Florida legislature, which meets for only a few months each year, closer to a full-time legislature.

=== Equal Rights Amendment ===
Haben opposed the Equal Rights Amendment, not for the content of the amendment, but because he felt that lawsuits involving women's rights should be left to Florida courts. Amending the United States Constitution would make any questions fall mainly within the jurisdiction of federal courts.
