= George Ira Baumgartner =

American politician

Georgia Ira Baumgartner
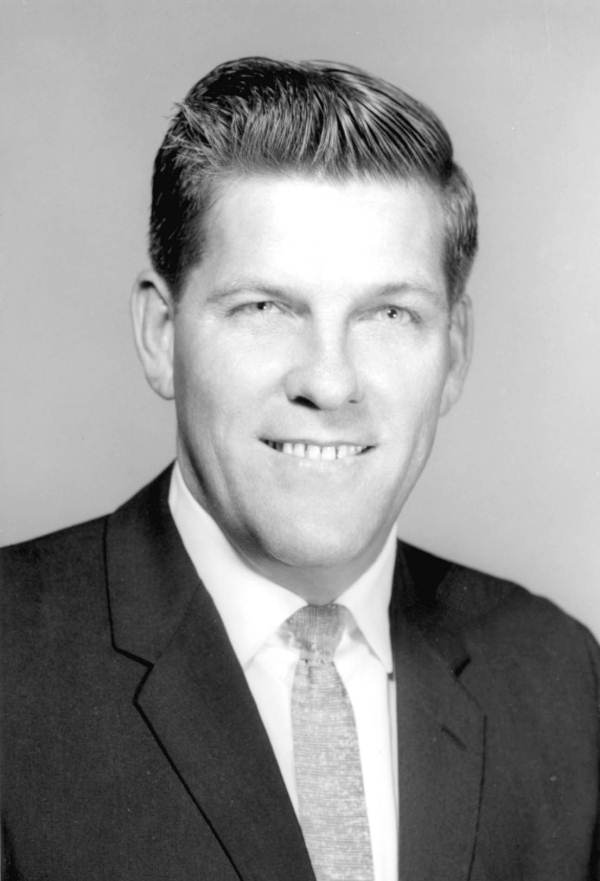
- Baumgartner in 1968

Member of the Florida House of Representatives from the 107th district
- In office 1968–1972
- Preceded by: Elton Gissendanner
- Succeeded by: A. M. Fontana

Member of the Florida House of Representatives from the 100th district
- In office 1972–1974
- Preceded by: Walter Wallace Sackett Jr.
- Succeeded by: Elaine Bloom

Personal details
- Born: August 23, 1928 Vero Beach, Florida, U.S.
- Died: June 28, 2014 (aged 85)
- Party: Democratic

George Ira Baumgartner (August 23, 1928 – June 28, 2014) was an American politician. He served as a Democratic member for the 100th and 107th district of the Florida House of Representatives.

== Life and career ==
Baumgartner was born in Vero Beach, Florida.

In 1968, Baumgartner was elected to represent the 107th district of the Florida House of Representatives, succeeding Elton Gissendanner. He served until 1972, when he was succeeded by A. M. Fontana. In the same year, he was elected to represent the 100th district, succeeding Walter Wallace Sackett Jr. He served until 1974, when he was succeeded by Elaine Bloom.

Baumgartner died on June 28, 2014, at the age of 85.
