= Louis Wolfson II =

American politician

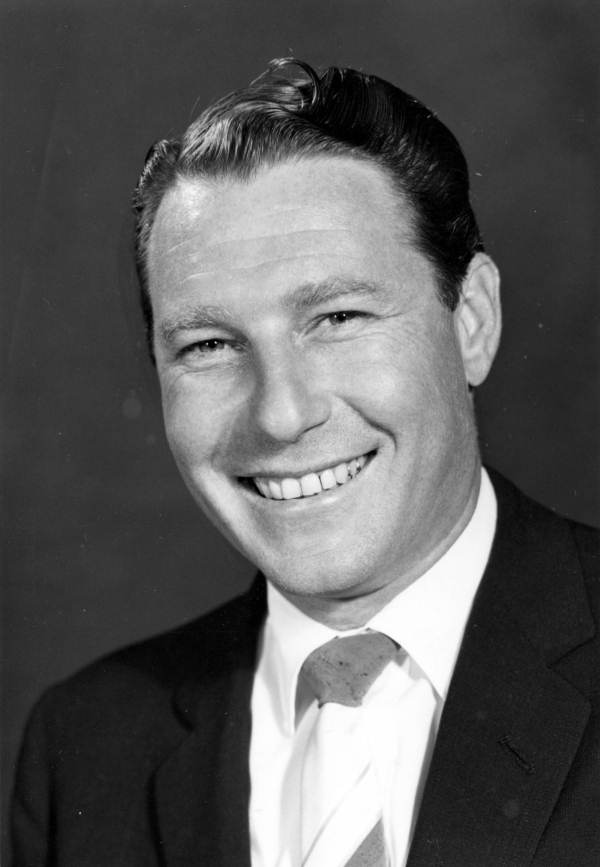
- Born: October 19, 1927
- Died: October 11, 1979 (aged 51)
- Spouse: Lynn Wolfson
- Parents: Mitchell Wolfson (father); Frances Meyer (mother)
- Family: Mitchell Wolfson Jr. (brother)

Wolfson and other state reps being administered their oath of office by Chief Justice B. Campbell Thornal on April 4, 1967 (left to right: Gerald Lewis, Maurice Ferré, Ken Myers, Wolfson, Murray Dubbin, Carey Matthews)

Louis Wolfson II (September 19, 1927 – October 11, 1979) was a member of the Florida House of Representatives from Miami-Dade County from 1963–1973.

== Biography ==
Wolfson was the son of Frances Meyer (1906–1980) and Mitchell Wolfson (1900–1983), who founded Wometco Enterprises in 1925 and was the first Jewish mayor of Miami Beach in 1943. Louis Wolfson II's younger brother is Mitchell Wolfson Jr., the founder of the Wolfsonian Museum.

The Lynn and Louis Wolfson II Florida Moving Image Archives (The Wolfson Archives) are named in honor of Louis Wolfson II and his wife Lynn Wolfson, one of the co-founders, who considered the archives "her signature work."

Louis Wolfson II and his wife Lynn Wolfson (née Rabin) had three children, Lynda Louise, Frances Jo and Louis Wolfson III. Louis Wolfson II died in 1979 in Miami, Florida.
