= Ruckdeschel =

Ruckdeschel is a surname of German origin. Its literal meaning is backpack or rucksack (compositum of Middle High German Rucke for back (cf. German Rücken) and the diminutive of the German word Tasche (Täschel/Däschel/Teschel/Deschel) for bag) and it was used in its area of origin – which closely corresponds to the contemporary Bavarian administrative region of Upper Franconia – to describe a journeyman. Outside of Germany the surname is most often found among German Americans in the Northeastern and Midwestern United States.

== Notable people with the surname ==
- Carol Ruckdeschel (born 1941), American biologist, naturalist and environmental activist
- John Ruckdeschel (born 1946), American oncologist
- Ludwig Ruckdeschel (1907–1986), German politician
