= 90 Miles =

2001 film by Juan Carlos Zaldívar

- Film poster
- Directed by: Juan Carlos Zaldívar
- Written by: Juan Carlos Zaldívar
- Release date: February 15, 2001 (IFP Los Angeles Film Festival)
- Running time: 143 minutes
- Country: United States
- Language: English

90 Miles is a 2001 documentary film written and directed by Juan Carlos Zaldívar. The film is a recounting of the events that lead Zaldívar to become a Marielito and leave Cuba for a better life in Miami. It premiered in 2003 on PBS as part of its P.O.V. series. It won the award for Best Documentary at the New York International Latino Film Festival and it won two awards at the Havana Film Festival also known in Spanish as Festival Internacional del Nuevo Cine Latinoamericano de La Habana in Havana, Cuba in 2001: the Black Coral, First Prize, for Best Documentary and the Memoria Documentary Award (which was a joint win with Cuando lo pequeño se hace grande (2000 film)|Cuando lo pequeño se hace grande). 90 Miles was also awarded the Media History Award by the Wolfson family Media History Center in Miami, Florida (aka The Lynn and Louis Wolfson II Florida Moving Image Archives ) that year. 90 Miles recounts the strange twist of fate that took Juan Carlos Zaldívar across one of the world's most treacherous stretches of water. It is a journey of a family in search for healing and understanding. IndieWire called 90 miles "Probing and thoughtful." Zaldívar uncovers the emotional distance opened in thousands of families by the 90 miles between the U.S. and Cuba.

== Synopsis ==
Having been born and grown during the Cuban Revolution, in 1980, Zaldívar was a 13-year-old jeering in the streets at the thousands of "Marielitos" leaving the island by boat for the United States. However, within weeks, he had become a Marielito himself, headed with the rest of his family for a new life in Miami. Now a U.S.-based filmmaker, Zaldívar recounts the strange twist of fate that took him across one of the world's most treacherous stretches of water in 90 Miles.

As related by Zaldívar in the intensely personal and evocative film, arrival in South Florida is only the beginning of the family's struggle to comprehend the full meaning of their passage into exile. What follows is an intimate and uneasy accounting of the historical forces that have split the Cuban national family in two, and which shape the passage of values from one generation to the next.

90 Miles was filmed over eight years, as the filmmaker returned to Cuba for the first time in 1998 to visit his hometown of Holguín, and again in 1999. Using news clips, family photos and home movies, the film creates a portrait of recent Cuban history, as dramatized by one family's aspirations and disappointments. Zaldívar's is a tale rich in crossed borders, cultural re-assimilation and cross-cultural ferment. In the early 1980s, during the Mariel boatlift, Zaldivar was a highly promising student. Having grown in a socialist country, Zaldivar was happy to join in the regime's efforts to publicly humiliate some of the thousands of Cubans who were leaving in the boatlift, labeling them gusanos (worms).

Unbeknownst to him, a change was in the horizon for Zaldivar and his family. One of his uncles who had fled to the U.S. in the 1960s offered to arrange the family's boatlift to Florida — on the condition that all or none of the family go. The family was reluctant to interrupt the lives of their children — Zaldívar and his two sisters — if the siblings were not willing. So the decision fell, for all practical purposes, on the young ones.

Faced with the sudden possibility of leaving the country, Zaldívar's family revealed to him, for the first time, their ongoing disillusionment with the Cuban Revolution. Out of this difference grew a cruel dilemma for the child. In the end, unable to deny his family the opportunity to start anew in Florida and deciding to place blind trust in his parents, Zaldívar agreed to go.

In the United States, though homesick and nostalgic for his homeland and surprised both by what he liked and disliked about North American life, Zaldívar resumed learning and growing with the headstrong adaptability so often demonstrated by youth. He continued his media studies, moved to New York, became a filmmaker and came out as a gender activist. Similarly, his two sisters made happy lives, marrying and having children.

It is the older generation, which had most wanted to come to Florida, that experienced the greater problems. Zaldívar's father, especially, grew depressed and remote from his son after arriving. The father's dream of building his own home in Cuba, derailed by the Revolution, seemed to lose its power in the United States, where many Cuban men find themselves working jobs well below their professional level. Feeling betrayed by the Cuban Revolution and defeated by the 'American Dream,' Zaldívar's father withdrew into himself. Where Zaldívar's revolutionary zeal in Cuba had created a divide of silence between father and son, in the U.S., the father's sense of failure and futility only widened the gap.
