= Carey Matthews =

American politician (1921–1992)

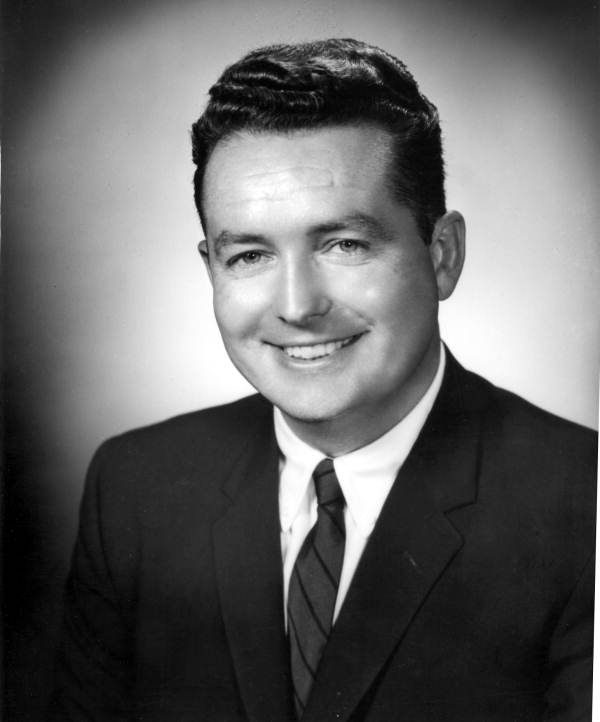
- Matthews in 1961

Member of the Florida House of Representatives from the 110th district
- In office November 5, 1968 – January 15, 1972
- Preceded by: George Firestone
- Succeeded by: Walter Wallace Sackett Jr.

Personal details
- Born: September 18, 1921 New York, U.S.
- Died: September 13, 1992 (aged 70) Pompano Beach, Florida, U.S.
- Party: Democratic
- Education: Yale University; Amherst College

Matthews and other state reps being administered their oath of office by Chief Justice B. Campbell Thornal on April 4, 1967 (left to right: Gerald Lewis, Maurice Ferré, Ken Myers, Louis Wolfson II, Murray Dubbin, Matthews)

Charles Carey Matthews (September 18, 1921 – September 13, 1992) was an American politician. He served as a Democratic member for the 110th district of the Florida House of Representatives.

Matthews was born in New York on September 18, 1921. Matthews attended Yale University and Amherst College. He moved to Florida in 1952. In 1968, Matthews was elected for the 110th district of the Florida House of Representatives. He succeeded George Firestone. In January 1972, Matthews resigned and was succeeded by Walter Wallace Sackett Jr.

Matthews was a long time resident of Live Oak, Florida. He died in Pompano Beach on September 13, 1992, at the age of 70.
