= Ken Myers (politician) =

American politician

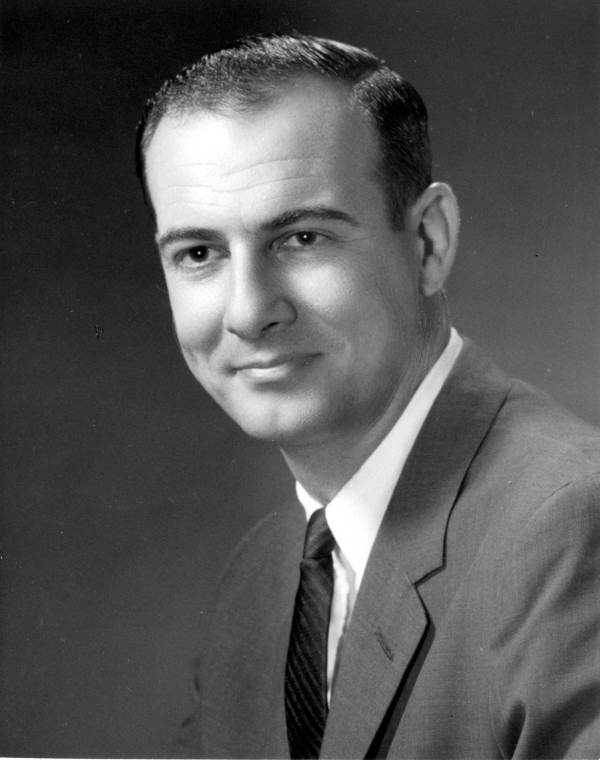

Member of the Florida Senate from the 37th district
- In office November 7, 1972 – November 4, 1980
- Preceded by: Charles Weber
- Succeeded by: Gwen Margolis

Member of the Florida Senate from the 45th district
- In office November 5, 1968 – November 7, 1972
- Preceded by: Tom Spencer
- Succeeded by: abolished

Member of the Florida House of Representatives from the 94th district
- In office 1967 – November 5, 1968
- Preceded by: (district created??)
- Succeeded by: Lewis Whitworth

Member of the Florida House of Representatives from the Dade district
- In office 1965–1966
- Preceded by: Multi-member district
- Succeeded by: District abolished

Personal details
- Born: March 11, 1933 Miami, Florida, U.S.
- Died: July 29, 2007 (aged 74)
- Party: Democratic
- Education: University of North Carolina (AB); University of Florida (LLB)
- Occupation: lawyer

Myers and other state reps being administered their oath of office by Chief Justice B. Campbell Thornal on April 4, 1967 (left to right: Gerald Lewis, Maurice Ferré, Meyers, Louis Wolfson II, Murray Dubbin, Carey Matthews)

Kenneth M. Myers (March 11, 1933 – July 29, 2007) was a politician in the American state of Florida. He served in the Florida House of Representatives from 1965 to 1968, representing the 94th district. He served in the Florida Senate from 1968 to 1980.

Myers died on July 29, 2007, at the age of 74.
