= Murray Dubbin =

American politician (1929–2022)

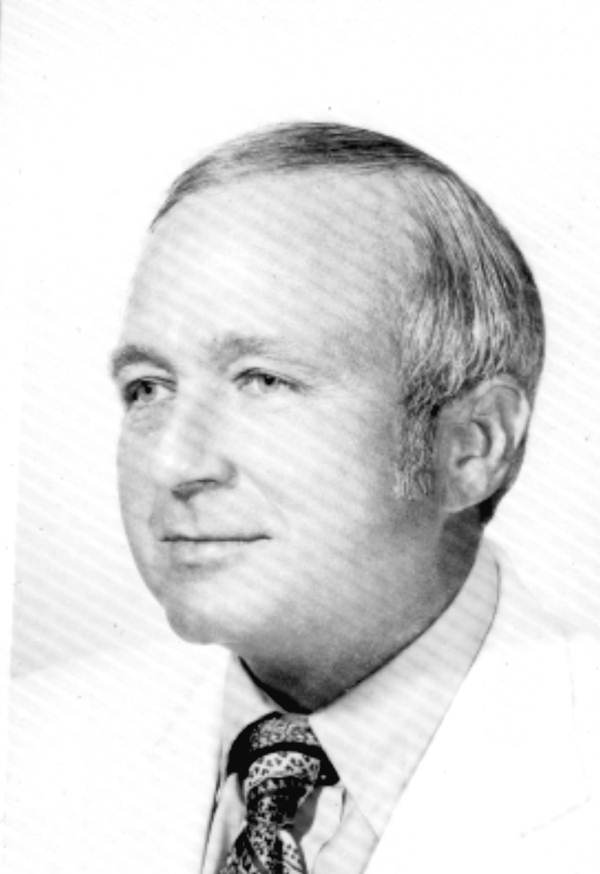

Member of the Florida House of Representatives for the 95th district
- In office 1963–1974

Personal details
- Born: August 1, 1929 Miami, Florida
- Died: October 5, 2022 (aged 93) Miami, Florida
- Party: Democratic
- Education: University of Florida
- Occupation: attorney

Dubbin and other state reps being administered their oath of office by Chief Justice B. Campbell Thornal on April 4, 1967 (left to right: Gerald Lewis, Maurice Ferré, Ken Myers, Louis Wolfson II, Dubbin, Carey Matthews)

Murray Harrington Dubbin (August 1, 1929 – October 5, 2022) was an American politician in the state of Florida.

He served in the Florida House of Representatives from 1963 to 1974. Dubbin was a practicing lawyer, having received his law degree at the University of Florida in 1951.
