= Sam Gibbons =

American politician

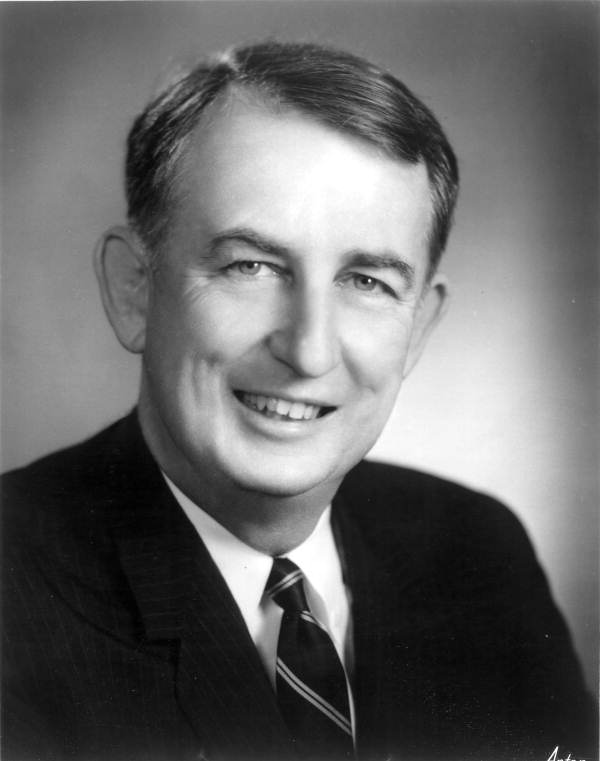

Ranking Member of the House Ways and Means Committee
- In office January 3, 1995 – January 3, 1997
- Preceded by: Bill Archer
- Succeeded by: Charles Rangel

Chair of the House Ways and Means Committee
- In office June 1, 1994 – January 3, 1995
- Preceded by: Dan Rostenkowski
- Succeeded by: Bill Archer

Member of the U.S. House of Representatives from Florida
- In office January 3, 1963 – January 3, 1997
- Preceded by: District established
- Succeeded by: Jim Davis
- Constituency: 10th district (1963–1967); 6th district (1967–1973); 7th district (1973–1993); 11th district (1993–1997)

Member of the Florida Senate from the 34th district
- In office 1959–1962
- Preceded by: Paul Kickliter
- Succeeded by: Tom Whitaker, Jr.

Member of the Florida House of Representatives
- In office 1953–1958

Personal details
- Born: January 20, 1920 Tampa, Florida, U.S.
- Died: October 10, 2012 (aged 92) Tampa, Florida, U.S.
- Party: Democratic
- Spouse(s): Martha Hanley; Betty King Culbreath
- Children: 3 (including Mark)
- Education: University of Florida School of Law
- Profession: Attorney

Military service
- Service: United States Army
- Years of service: 1941–1945
- Rank: Major
- Unit: 501st Parachute Infantry Regiment
- Wars: World War II
- Awards: Bronze Star Medal; European–African–Middle Eastern Campaign Medal; Combat Infantryman Badge; Legion of Honor (Chevalier) (France)
- Sam Gibbons's voice Sam Gibbons on granting Most Favored Nation status to China; Recorded September 22, 1992

Samuel Melville Gibbons (January 20, 1920 – October 10, 2012) was an American attorney and politician from Florida. A United States Army veteran of World War II, Gibbons served in the Florida State House of Representatives and Florida State Senate. A liberal Democrat, he represented the Tampa area in the U.S. House of Representatives for over 30 years.

== Early life ==
Gibbons was born in Tampa, Florida on January 20, 1920, a son of Melville Gunby Gibbons and Jessie Kirk (Cralle) Gibbons. He attended Tampa's Roosevelt Elementary School, which later named its auditorium after him. He graduated from H. B. Plant High School in 1938. Gibbons attended the University of Florida, where he was a member of the Reserve Officers' Training Corps and vice president of his Alpha Tau Omega fraternity chapter, but left before graduating so he could enter the military for World War II.

== Military career ==
Gibbons joined the United States Army as a second lieutenant in late 1941. He attained the rank of captain in the 101st Airborne before entering combat in June 1944. At 1:00 a.m. on D-day, June 6, 1944, Gibbons, a member of the 501st Parachute Infantry Regiment, parachuted into France near Carentan, France, on the Cotentin Peninsula. On June 13, 1944, the main German forces counterattacked south of Carentan, in a battle between German tanks and the American paratroopers lasting all day, 6 am to 10 pm, the paratroopers gave ground, defending in depth, and bent but did not break before restoring the pre-dawn line of defense. Of the 600 paratroopers that began that day fewer than 400 soldiers remained. Gibbons could count a dozen burning tanks from his view of the battlefield. The battle was portrayed in episode 2 of Band of Brothers. On June 30 the 101st was withdrawn to England becoming the first battle-tested troops to return. He was later awarded the Bronze Star Medal for his actions in Normandy.

Gibbons and the rest of the 101st went on to successfully take the first bridge in Operation Market Garden (described in Cornelius Ryan's book A Bridge Too Far). In December 1944 the 101st was in reserve when orders came down to load up on trucks and move to Bastogne to hold and await resupply. Against very long odds the 101st held successfully with dwindling supplies, once famously telling the German commander "Nuts" in response to a surrender request. Several movies have been made concerning the "Battle of the Bulge." The 101st moved on to lead the way into Germany and eventually take Hitler's Eagle's Nest before meeting up with the advancing Red Army. Gibbons served in the European campaign until the end of the war. Shortly before German forces surrendered, Gibbons was promoted to major; however, a communications delay prevented Gibbons from learning of his promotion until after he had been honorably discharged. Upon returning home to Florida he authored a memoir of his wartime service, I Was There. Gibbons was awarded the French Legion of Honor (Chevalier) in 2004 at the Normandy American Cemetery and Memorial during the 60th anniversary of D-day.

== Political life ==
After leaving the army, Gibbons attended the University of Florida School of Law, graduating in 1947. He then joined four generations of his family practicing law in Tampa. He went on to marry Martha Hanley, and have three sons; Clifford Sam, Mark Hanley, and Timothy Melville. After 55 years of marriage, his wife died of cancer in 2002; Gibbons then married a recently widowed friend, Betty King Culbreath.

=== Florida legislature ===
Gibbons was a member of the Democratic Party and he served in the Florida House of Representatives as a delegate for Hillsborough County from 1953 until 1959 when he was elected to the Florida Senate. While in the state legislature, he spearheaded the effort to create the University of South Florida. He then served in the Florida Senate from 1959 to 1961 under the 34th Senate District after beating the incumbent Paul Kickliter.

=== US House ===
He was elected to the United States House of Representatives in 1962 from a newly created district based in Tampa after defeating segregationist Sumter de Leon Lowry Jr. in the Democratic primary and runoff elections, and was reelected 16 times. Gibbons voted against the Civil Rights Act of 1964, but in favor of the Voting Rights Act of 1965 and the Civil Rights Act of 1968. He also voted in favor of a number of pieces of environmental legislation such as the Clean Air and Water Act along with President Nixon's veto of the Clean Water Act.

With regards to foreign policy Gibbons voted in favor of the Gulf of Tonkin Resolution and for the Gulf War's AUMF.

The district changed numbers three times during his tenure, from the 10th (1963–1967) to the 6th (1967–1973) to the 7th (1973–1993) to the 11th (1993–1997). He usually skated to reelection in what was generally reckoned as the only Democratic bastion on Florida's Gulf Coast. However, in 1992, he was held to only 52 percent of the vote by Republican Mark Sharpe. Two years later, he defeated Sharpe again, only winning by 4,700 votes.

With Sharpe priming for yet another rematch in 1996, Gibbons opted not to run for an 18th term. He thus retired having never been defeated in 44 years as an elected official. He was succeeded by State Representative Jim Davis, whom he had endorsed as his successor.

Gibbons was acting chair of the House Ways and Means Committee from 1994 until the Democrats lost control of the House in 1995. Prior to leading the full committee, Gibbons chaired the subcommittee on trade. He was much more supportive of trade liberalization throughout his career than most House Democrats, who have leaned toward protectionism since the early 1970s. He voted in favor of ratifying the North American Free Trade Agreement (NAFTA).

Gibbons had a few verbal showdowns with the newly elected Republican congress during his last term. During a taped Ways and Means Committee hearing, after being denied the opportunity to speak several times, Gibbons stormed out of the room shouting about how the Democrats were being railroaded and given no time to speak. He compared the new Republicans to dictators and shouted that he had "to fight you guys 50 years ago," referring to Nazi Germany in World War II.

He retired from office in 1997. Gibbons died in Tampa on October 10, 2012, aged 92. He was buried at Myrtle Hill Memorial Park in Tampa. The United States Courthouse at 801 North Florida Avenue in Tampa was named in his honor.

== Electoral history ==
Note: According to the Florida Secretary of State Division of Elections website no results are available for 1988 and 1986 at the general or primary level.

1962 US House election, District 10 (general)

- Samuel "Sam" Melville Gibbons – 41,429 (70.4%)
- Victor A. Rule – 17,214 (29.25%)
- Scattering – 2 (0%)

1964 US House election, District 10 (general)

- Samuel "Sam" Melville Gibbons (Democratic) – 69,860 (99.57%)
- Scattering (various parties) – 305 (0.43%)

1980 US House election, District 7 (general)

- Samuel "Sam" Melville Gibbons (Democratic) – 132,529 (71.8%)
- Charles P. "Chuck" Jones (Republican) – 52,138 (28.2%)
- Ron Carnes (Write-in) – 32 (0.0%)

1982 US House election, District 7 (general)

- Samuel "Sam" Melville Gibbons (Democratic) – 85,331 (74.2%)
- Ken Ayers (Republican) – 29,632 (25.8%)

1984 US House election, District 7 (general)

- Samuel "Sam" Melville Gibbons (Democratic) – 100,430 (58.8%)
- Michael N. Kavouklis (Republican) – 70,280 (41.2%)

1990 US House election, District 7 (general)

- Samuel "Sam" Melville Gibbons (Democratic) – 99,464 (67.6%)
- Charles D. Prout (Republican) – 47,765 (32.4%)

1992 US House election, District 11 (general)

- Samuel "Sam" Melville Gibbons (Democratic) – 100,984 (52.8%)
- Mark Sharpe (Republican) – 77,640 (40.6%)
- Joe De Minico (Independent) – 12,730 (6.7%)

1994 US House election, District 11 (general)

- Samuel "Sam" Melville Gibbons (Democratic) – 76,821 (51.6%)
- Mark Sharpe (Republican) – 72,129 (48.4%)
- David Weeks (Write-in) – 9 (0.0%)

U.S. House of Representatives
Preceded by District Created	Member of the U.S. House of Representatives from Florida's 10th congressional district 1963–1967	Succeeded by J. Herbert Burke
Preceded by Paul G. Rogers	Member of the U.S. House of Representatives from Florida's 6th congressional district 1967–1973	Succeeded by Bill Young
Preceded by James A. Haley	Member of the U.S. House of Representatives from Florida's 7th congressional district 1973–1993	Succeeded by John Mica
Preceded by Jim Bacchus	Member of the U.S. House of Representatives from Florida's 11th congressional district 1993–1997	Succeeded by Jim Davis
Political offices
Preceded by Dan Rostenkowski; Illinois	Chairman of the House Ways and Means Committee; 1994–1995	Succeeded by Bill Archer; Texas
Preceded by Bill Archer; Texas	Ranking Member of the House Ways and Means Committee; 1995–1997	Succeeded by Charles Rangel; New York
