= David L. Barrett =

American businessman and politician

Dave Barrett
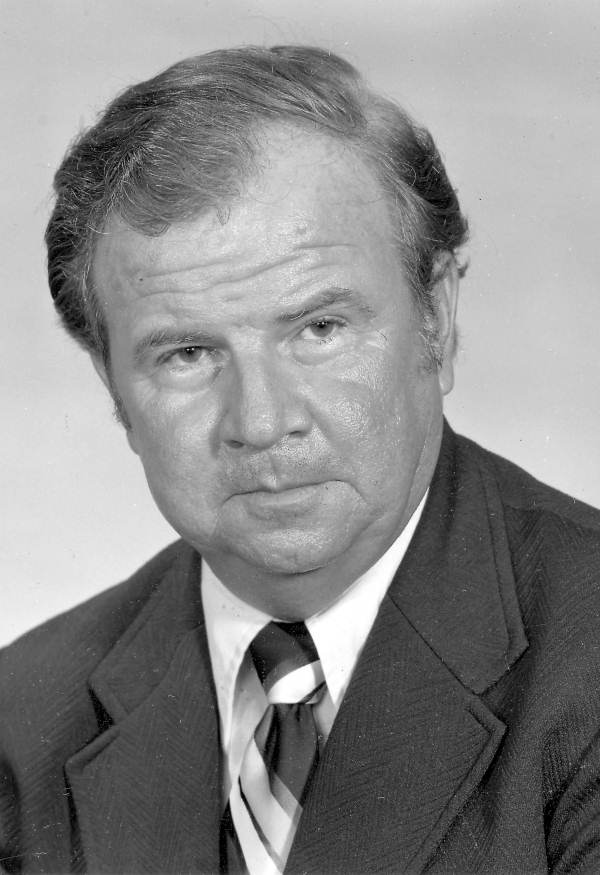

Member of the Florida House of Representatives from the 44th district
- In office 1974–1980
- Preceded by: Jack Shreve
- Succeeded by: Jason Steele

Personal details
- Born: David Lawrence Barrett; March 22, 1931 Wellsville, New York, US
- Died: May 14, 1999 (aged 68) Melbourne, Florida, US
- Party: Democratic
- Spouse: Dorothy Helen Tuite Barrett
- Children: 6
- Education: Rochester (in New York) Business Institute, College in Flint, Michigan, Rollins College in Winter Park, FL.
- Occupation: Member of the Florida House of Representatives; County Chairman of the Brevard County Democratic Party in Brevard County, Florida; Owner of Lorenzo's Italian Restaurant, West Melbourne, Florida; Licensed Hypnotist, Former owner of Mighty Clean Cleaning Service; Probation and Parole Officer; Cost Estimator

David L. "Dave" Barrett (March 22, 1931 – May 14, 1999) was a businessman and politician in the state of Florida.

He was born in New York and moved to Florida in 1963. He was an alumnus of the Rochester Business Institute, Kettering University, and Rollins College and became a businessman.

He served in the Florida House of Representatives for district 44 from 1974 to 1980 as a member of the Democratic Party.

== Personal life and death ==
Barrett was married to Dorothy H. (née Tuite) Barrett on September 8, 1956, with whom he had six children. He died of progressive supranuclear palsy in Melbourne, Florida on May 14, 1999, at the age of 68.
