= Roberta Fox =

American politician

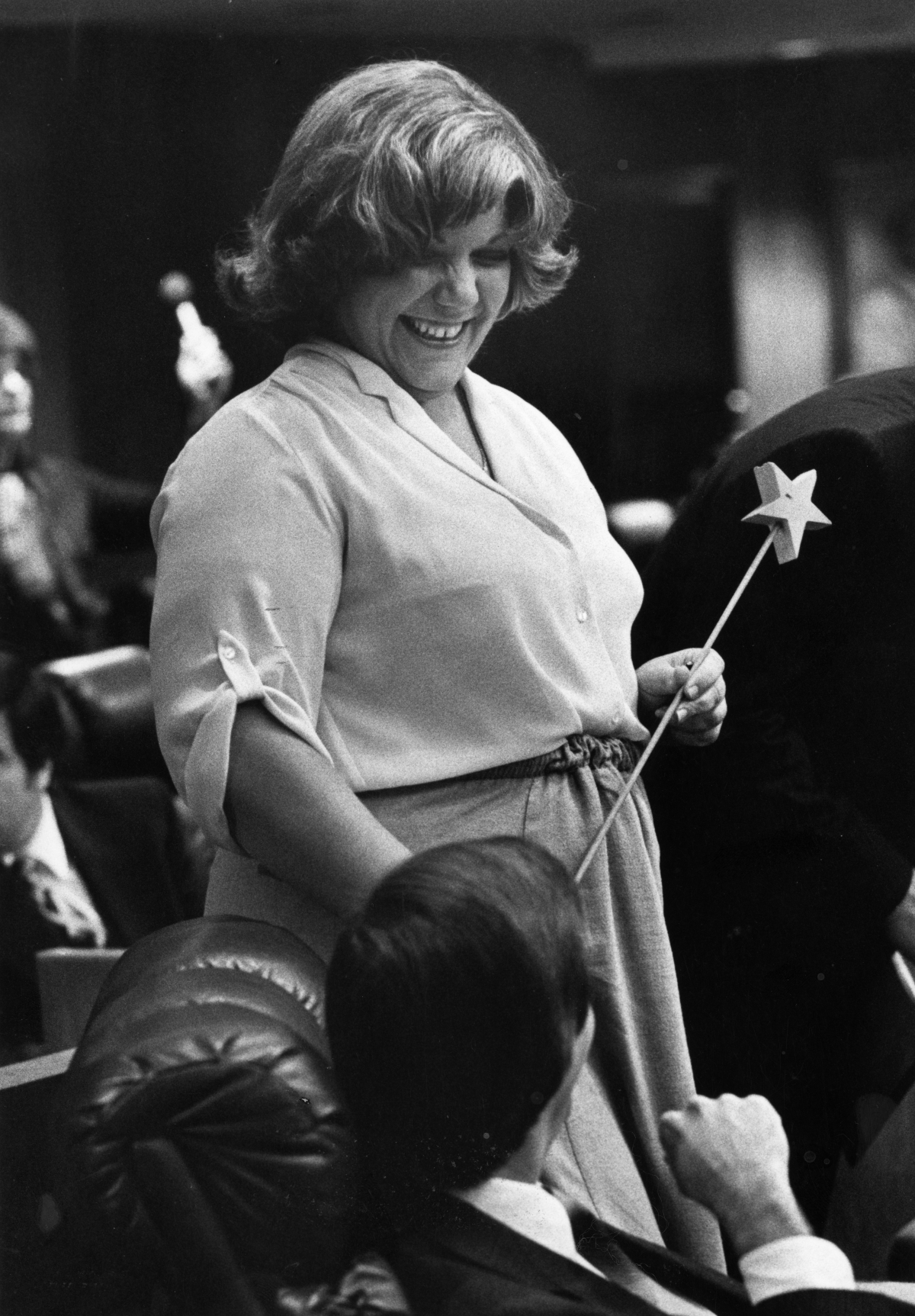
- Fox in 1981

Member of the Florida Senate from the 40th district
- In office November 2, 1982 – November 4, 1986
- Preceded by: Dick Anderson
- Succeeded by: Dexter Lehtinen

Member of the Florida House of Representatives from the 110th district
- In office November 2, 1976 – November 2, 1982
- Preceded by: Walter Wallace Sackett Jr.
- Succeeded by: Ileana Ros-Lehtinen

Personal details
- Born: November 25, 1943
- Died: August 9, 2009 (aged 65)
- Party: Democratic
- Spouse: Mike Gold
- Education: University of Florida, Fredric G. Levin College of Law

Roberta Fulton Fox (November 25, 1943 – August 9, 2009) was a Florida attorney, politician, and feminist.

She was born on November 25, 1943, and earned her law degree from the University of Florida, Fredric G. Levin College of Law. On June 10, 1968, Fox was admitted to the Florida State Bar. She practiced law with her husband Mike Gold. In addition to being an attorney, Fox served as a member of the Florida House of Representatives (1976-1982) and the Florida Senate (1982-1986). During her time in politics, she focused on issues such as family law reform—especially with regard to women’s and children’s rights. Fox died on August 9, 2009, after battling breast cancer.
