= Jack Shreve =

American politician

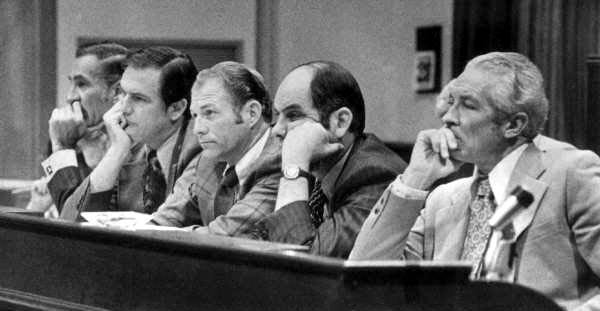
- Shreve with Bill Fulford, Ed Fortune, Ralph Turlington and Gus Craig, 1972

Member of the Florida House of Representatives from the 71st district
- In office 1970–1972
- Preceded by: Charles E. Davis Jr.
- Succeeded by: Ralph H. Haben Jr.

Member of the Florida House of Representatives from the 44th district
- In office 1972–1974
- Preceded by: Robert C. Milburn
- Succeeded by: David L. Barrett

Personal details
- Born: July 24, 1932 Crestview, Florida, U.S.
- Died: June 12, 2018 (aged 85)
- Party: Democratic
- Education: University of Florida

Jack Shreve (July 24, 1932 – June 12, 2018) was an American politician. He served as a Democratic member for the 44th and 71st district of the Florida House of Representatives.

== Life and career ==
Shreve was born in Crestview, Florida. He attended the University of Florida.

In 1970, Shreve was elected to represent the 71st district of the Florida House of Representatives, succeeding Charles E. Davis Jr. He served until 1972, when he was succeeded by Ralph H. Haben Jr. In the same year, he was elected to represent the 44th district, succeeding Robert C. Milburn. He served until 1974, when he was succeeded by David L. Barrett.

Shreve died on June 12, 2018, at the age of 85.
