= A. M. Fontana =

American politician

Tony (Antonio Matteo) Fontana
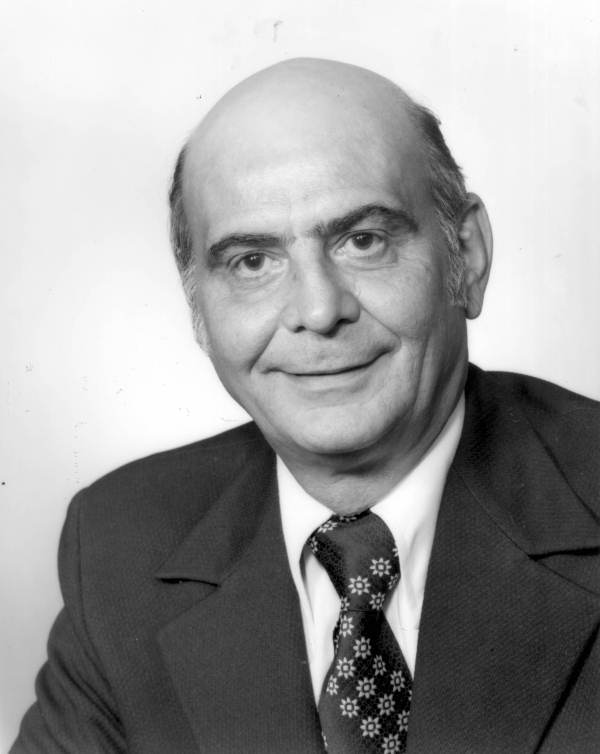
- Fontana in 1976

Member of the Florida House of Representatives from the 107th district
- In office 1972–1982
- Preceded by: George Ira Baumgartner
- Succeeded by: Roberto Casas

Personal details
- Born: June 4, 1924 Providence, Rhode Island, U.S.
- Died: February 25, 2010 (aged 85) Tallahassee, Florida, U.S.
- Party: Democratic
- Education: University of North Carolina; Williams College; Mount St. Mary's College

A. M. Fontana (June 4, 1924 – February 25, 2010) was an American politician. He served as a Democratic member for the 107th district of the Florida House of Representatives.

== Life and career ==
Fontana was born in Providence, Rhode Island. He attended Mount Pleasant High School, the University of North Carolina, Williams College and Mount St. Mary's College.

In 1972, Fontana was elected to represent the 107th district of the Florida House of Representatives, succeeding George Ira Baumgartner. He served until 1982, when he was succeeded by Roberto Casas.

Fontana died on February 25, 2010, in Tallahassee, Florida, at the age of 85.
