= Gerald Lewis (politician) =

American politician (1934–2022)

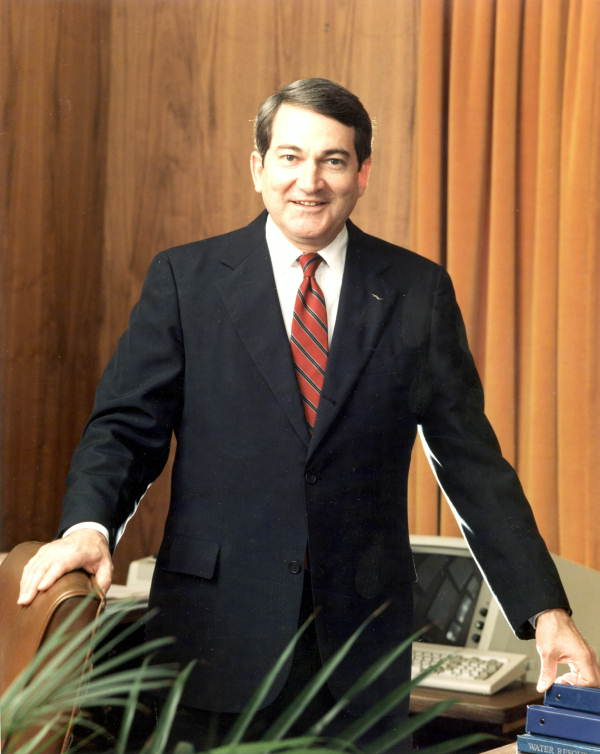
- Jerry Lewis, 1975

Florida State Comptroller
- In office January 7, 1975 – January 3, 1995

Member of the Florida House of Representatives
- In office 1966–1970

Personal details
- Born: March 31, 1934 Birmingham, Alabama, U.S.
- Died: January 25, 2022 (aged 87)
- Party: Democratic
- Spouse: Ann Lewis (div. 1968)
- Children: Patricia, Bethellen and Susan
- Education: Harvard University

Military service
- Allegiance: United States
- Branch/service: United States Army
- Rank: Captain
- Unit: Paratrooper

Gerald Alvin Lewis (March 31, 1934 – January 25, 2022) was an American attorney and politician who served in the Florida House of Representatives and was the 26th comptroller of the State of Florida, serving from January 7, 1975, to January 3, 1995.

== Life and career ==
Born in 1934 in Birmingham, Alabama, to Bernard and Molly Lewis, Gerald Lewis was educated in Birmingham schools before attending Harvard College and graduating with an A.B. degree in 1955. He then spent the next two years on active duty as a paratrooper with the United States Army, attaining the rank of captain.

Lewis and other state reps being administered their oath of office by Chief Justice B. Campbell Thornal on April 4, 1967 (left to right: Lewis, Maurice Ferré, Ken Myers, Louis Wolfson II, Murray Dubbin, Carey Matthews)

Lewis moved to Florida in 1960. Prior to moving, he returned to Harvard to obtain a LL.B degree. He was elected to the Florida House of Representatives in 1965 for Dade County, Florida, and served until 1970. He later served as the state comptroller under governors Reubin Askew, Bob Graham, Bob Martinez, and Lawton Chiles.

Lewis was married to national Democratic Party political strategist Ann Lewis until their 1968 divorce.

Lewis died on January 25, 2022, at the age of 87.

Party political offices
Preceded by Fred Otis Dickinson	Democratic nominee for Florida Comptroller; 1974, 1978, 1982, 1986, 1990, 1994	Succeeded by Newall Jerome Daughtrey
