= Charles E. Davis Jr. =

American politician (1932–2000)

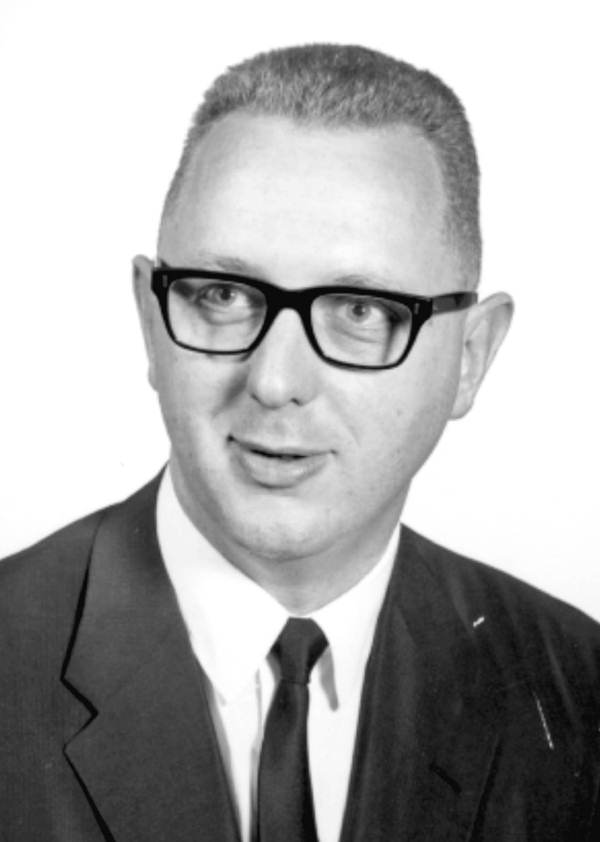
- Davis in 1968

Member of the Florida House of Representatives from the 71st district
- In office 1967–1970
- Preceded by: District established
- Succeeded by: Jack Shreve

Personal details
- Born: June 18, 1932 Los Angeles, California, U.S.
- Died: March 26, 2000 (aged 67) Vero Beach, Florida, U.S.
- Party: Republican
- Education: Stanford University; University of Southern California

Charles Edwin Davis Jr. (June 18, 1932 – March 26, 2000) was an American politician. He served as a Republican member for the 71st district of the Florida House of Representatives.

== Life and career ==
Davis was born in Los Angeles, California, on June 18, 1932. He attended Stanford University and the University of Southern California.

In 1967, Davis was elected as the first representative for the newly established 71st district of the Florida House of Representatives. He served until 1970, when he was succeeded by Jack Shreve.

Davis died in Vero Beach, Florida, on March 26, 2000, at the age of 67.
