= Mitchell Wolfson Jr. =

American businessman

- Born: September 30, 1939 (age 87); Miami Beach, Florida, U.S.
- Known for: founder of The Wolfsonian-FIU
- Parent: Mitchell Wolfson Sr.
- Family: Louis Wolfson II (brother)

Mitchell "Micky" Wolfson Jr. (born September 30, 1939) is an American businessman, collector, and the founder of The Wolfsonian-FIU in Miami Beach, Florida, and the Wolfsoniana in Genoa–Nervi, Italy.

== Early life and education ==
He was born in Miami Beach, Florida and raised in Miami Beach and Asheville, North Carolina, the son of Frances Cohen (December 16, 1906– May 9, 1980) and Mitchell Wolfson (1900–1983), the founder of Wometco Enterprises in 1925 and the first Jewish mayor of Miami Beach in 1943. His older brother, Louis Wolfson II, was a Florida state representative from Miami-Dade County from 1963–1973.

Wolfson received an undergraduate degree from Princeton University and a master's degree in International relations from the Paul N. Nitze School of Advanced International Studies at Johns Hopkins University.

== Activities ==
In 1986 Wolfson established The Wolfsonian Foundation, a research center and museum in Miami Beach, and began publishing The Journal of Decorative and Propaganda Art, a journal fostering scholarship in late 19th- and early 20th-century design. In the same year he acquired the Mackenzie Castle in Genoa to house his collection, although the restoration works he commissioned remained unfinished and the manor was later sold to an auction house.

Wolfson co-authored Miami Beach: Blueprint of an Eden with artist Michele Oka Doner. Published in 2005, the book is a personal portrayal of Miami Beach from the 1920s through the 1960s.

He is president of The Wolfson Initiative, Washington Storage Company, and the Novecento Corporation. He sits on the Wolfsonian–FIU Advisory Board and the Florida International University Board of Directors and is a trustee for the Mitchell Wolfson Senior Foundation that supports educational and health issues. Also, he is a trustee for the Mitchell Wolfson Family Foundation that supports the Audubon House and Tropical Gardens in Key West, Florida. He is a member of the International Council of the Museum of Arts and Design, the International Council of The Museum of Modern Art, the International Council of Les Arts Décoratifs in Paris, France, and a past member of the American Friends of the Louvre. He is on the advisory council of Princeton University’s Department of Comparative Literature and on the advisory council of the Paul N. Nitze School of Advanced International Studies at Johns Hopkins University.

== Museums ==
In 1997 he donated his collection, estimated at 80,000 objects, and the state-of-the-art museum to Florida International University. It was the basis for The Wolfsonian–FIU, a research center and museum. In downtown Miami, the new Mitchell Wolfson Jr. Study Centre provides access to a collection of decorative, design and propaganda arts of the period 1885 to 1945. In Italy, the Wolfsoniana Museum in Genoa exhibits elements from his collection that comprises more than 18,000 works on paper, paintings, sculpture, furniture and decorative objects.

He donated his Italian collection to the Fondazione Cristoforo Colombo in Genoa. The City of Genoa has opened the Wolfsoniana and a research center in the local Doge's Palace. He also established the Wolfsonian International Council to support an exchange of scholarship and exhibitions between Miami's Wolfsonian–FIU and Genoa's Wolfsoniana.
