= Paul Kickliter =

American politician

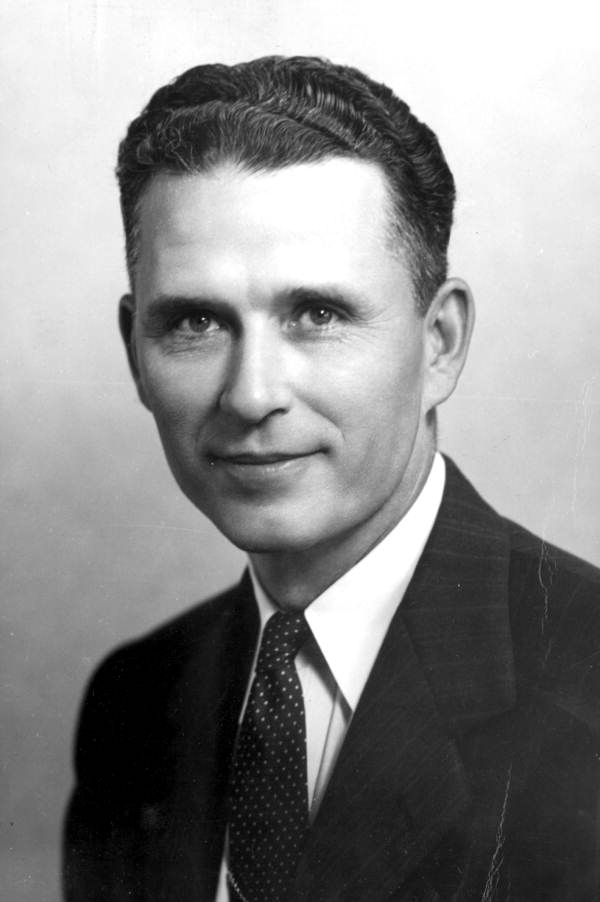
- Kickliter in 1955

Member of the Florida Senate from the 34th district
- In office 1955–1957

Personal details
- Born: December 15, 1904
- Died: October 12, 1994 (aged 89)
- Party: Democratic
- Education: University of Florida; Florida State Normal College

Paul Revere Kickliter (December 15, 1904 – October 12, 1994) was an American teacher, lawyer, judge, landowner and politician. He served as a Democratic member for the 34th district of the Florida Senate.

== Life and career ==
Kickliter was born December 15, 1904, in Wimauma, Florida, to George Manning and Emma Walker Kickliter. He attended the University of Florida and Florida State Normal College.

He was a teacher in Hillsborough County and became the Palm River school principal at the age of 19 after three years as a teacher. Kickliter married Lucie Lucille Hall November 28, 1929, at a Baptist church. He served two terms on the Hillsborough County School Board after first being elected in 1930.

Kickliter was elected as the county democratic executive committee treasurer July 1936, with his first act being to donate $500 to the Franklin D. Roosevelt re-election campaign. He declared his intention to run for Juvenile court in April 1938, running against two lawyers including the incumbent judge Thomas B. Castiglia. He won the election in May 1938 and served as judge on the Hillsborough County Juvenile Court for four terms. He was admitted to the Florida Bar in December 1942. After several cases involving shootings by juveniles he advocated for boys to be taught safe gun use asking the police chief to authorise classes at the police gun range.

After 16 years of service to the juvenile court Kickliter declared that he would not seek re-election for a fifth term but instead intended to run for a seat on the State Senate. He declared he intention early in 1954 to give fair notice so any candidates for the court would have time to prepare. Since passing the bar he had practiced law as well as his judicial service and had argued cases at all levels from county, circuit and federal courts to the supreme court. He wrote an open letter refuting claims made by his competition John Branch in "approximately 100,000 scandal sheets". In May 1953 Kickliter won the senate seat over John Branch who had been the incumbent. Kickliter served in the Florida Senate from 1955 to 1957, representing the 34th district. During his first senate session he led the appropriation bill to fund the establishment of the University of South Florida with Kickliter also offering 1000 acres of his own land. Kickliter was a wealthy land owner at the time. He ran again for a second session, declaring in June 1958, but lost by a wide margin to state representative Sam Gibbons in September 1958.

Kickliter died on October 12, 1994, at the age of 89 and was survived by his wife and four children.
