= H. Lee Moffitt =

American politician

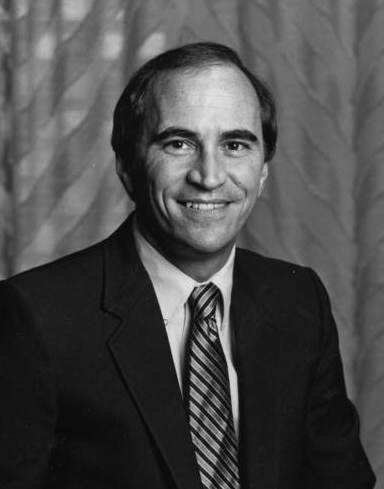

Speaker of the Florida House of Representatives
- In office November 16, 1982 – November 6, 1984
- Preceded by: Ralph Haben
- Succeeded by: James Harold Thompson

Member of the Florida House of Representatives from the 66th district
- In office November 5, 1974 – November 6, 1984
- Preceded by: T. Terrell Sessums
- Succeeded by: Mark Gibbons

Personal details
- Born: Houston Lee Moffitt; November 10, 1941 (age 84) Tampa, Florida
- Party: Democratic Party
- Spouse: Dianne Davant Moffitt
- Children: 1
- Profession: Attorney

Houston Lee Moffitt (born November 10, 1941) is an American politician and attorney. He served as Speaker of the Florida House of Representatives from 1982 to 1984.

== Early life and education ==
Moffitt was born in Tampa, Florida on November 10, 1941, to Clara and B. B. Moffitt Jr., a ship welder. He attended Henry B. Plant High School in Tampa, graduating in 1959. He later obtained his Bachelor of Arts from the University of South Florida in 1964 and his Juris Doctor from Cumberland School of Law in 1967.

== Career ==
Moffitt was elected to the Florida House in 1974, serving Tampa, Florida. He served as Democratic member of the Florida House of Representatives, holding various positions throughout his ten years of service there. In 1976 he was selected as the Most Effective First-Term House member and presented with the Allen Morris Award by the Florida Times-Union. From 1978 to 1980 he chaired the Commerce Committee, and the House Reapportionment Committee from 1980 to 1982. He was again selected by St. Petersburg Times (now Tampa Bay Times) as the "most Effective Member of the House" in 1982, as Chairman of the House Reapportionment Committee. In November 1982, he was elected Speaker of the Florida House of Representatives and served in this capacity until 1984. He retired from the legislature in 1984 to return to the practice of law.

During his legislative career he passed constitutional resolutions that created a merit selection process for the Florida Appellate Judiciary and granting Floridians a right to privacy. Both constitutional amendments were approved by Florida voters. He also led the effort to pass the Water Quality and Assurance Act of 1983, and the Growth Management Act of 1985.

Moffitt serves on the board of the H. Lee Moffitt Cancer Center & Research Institute and on the Board of M2Gen, a for-profit subsidiary of the Moffitt Cancer Center. He was also the first University of South Florida alumnus to be presented with the Distinguished Alumni Award in 1976.

=== H. Lee Moffitt Cancer Center & Research Institute ===
While a member of the house of representative, Moffitt spearheaded a project to build a cancer treatment center in Florida. Moffitt had been diagnosed with a malignant tumor in his left knee at age 29, for which he did a tumor resection. It was this experience, along with the death of friends, Joseph Lumia, Judy Barnett and George Edgecomb, from cancer, that motivated Moffitt to lobby for a cancer treatment center in Tampa. He secured an initial $70-million via the Legislature for the commencement of the construction.

The H. Lee Moffitt Cancer Center & Research Institute officially opened on October 27, 1986, three years after its groundbreaking. Despite Moffitt's objection, the Florida legislature voted to name the facility in his honor. In 2006 he was honored by the Association of Community Cancer Centers' (ACCC) Annual Achievement Award for his commitment to combating cancer through the center he founded. Since its founding the center has expanded its services and was designated an NCI Comprehensive Cancer Center in 2001.

== Personal life ==
Moffitt is married to Dianne Davant Moffitt of Dianne Davant and Associates. They make their homes in Tampa Bay, Florida and Blowing Rock, North Carolina.

== Awards and recognition ==
- Outstanding Citizen of the Year - 2025
- H.L. Culbreath Jr. Profile in Leadership Award - 2022
- Legends – Florida 500 - 2018-2024
- Florida Icon - 2019
- Person of Vision Award - 2019
- Lifetime Achievement Award from BioFlorida – 2017
- Tampa Bay Lightning Community Hero – 2016
- Lifetime Achievement Award from Leadership Florida – 2013
- Annual Achievement Award from the Association of Community Cancer Centers – 2006.
- Distinguished Alumni Award from the University of South Florida – 1976
- Honorary Doctorate of Humane Letters from the Florida Board of Regents
- National Achievement Award from Association of Community Cancer Centers
