= Florida's 110th House of Representatives district =

American legislative district

Florida's 110th State House of Representatives district
Representative
José R. Oliva; R–Miami Lakes
- Demographics: 88.0% White; 6.0% Black; 87.0% Hispanic; 1.0% Asian; 0.1% Native American; 0.0% Hawaiian/Pacific Islander; 3.1% Other
- Population (2010): 154,817

Florida's 110th House district elects one member of the Florida House of Representatives. The district is represented by José R. Oliva. This district is located in the Miami metropolitan area. The district covers a portion of Miami-Dade County including a portion of Hialeah, Florida.

As of the 2010 census, the district's population is 154,817.

== Past representatives ==
Representatives	Party	Years of service	Hometown	Notes
George Firestone	Democratic	1967		Unknown date of being elected, just the year, according to the cited source.
Carey Matthews	Democratic	November 5, 1968 - January 15, 1972		resigned on January 15, 1972
Walter Wallace Sackett Jr.	Democratic	November 7, 1972 - November 2, 1976		
Roberta Fox	Democratic	November 2, 1976 - November 2, 1982		
Ileana Ros-Lehtinen	Republican	November 2, 1982 – November 4, 1986		redistricted
Lincoln Díaz-Balart	Republican	November 18, 1986 – August 28, 1989		
Miguel De Grandy	Republican	1989 - November 3, 1992		
Rudy García	Republican	November 3, 1992 – November 7, 2000		
René García	Republican	November 7, 2000 – November 4, 2008		
Esteban Bovo	Republican	November 4, 2008 – March 25, 2011		Resigned March 25, 2011 to run for Miami-Dade Commissioner
José R. Oliva	Republican	September 19, 2011 – Present		
