= Mitchell Wolfson =

American businessman and politician

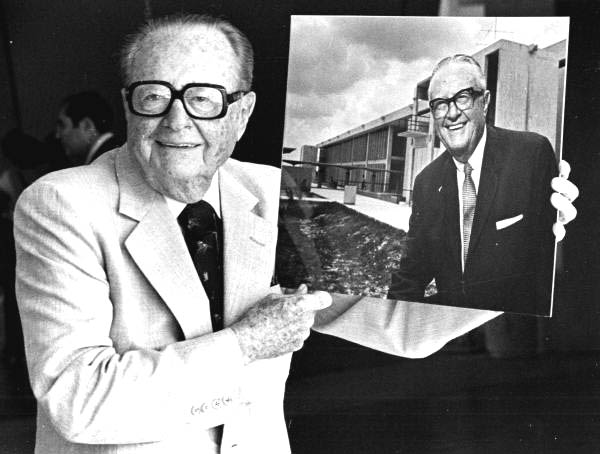
- Wolfson in 1980

12th Mayor of Miami Beach
- In office 1943–1944

Personal details
- Born: 1900 Key West, Florida, U.S.
- Died: January 28, 1983 (aged 82–83) Miami, Florida, U.S.
- Spouse: Frances Meyer
- Children: Mitchell Wolfson Jr. Louis Wolfson II
- Education: B.A. Columbia University
- Occupation: Theatre owner Politician
- Known for: Founder of Wometco Enterprises and WTVJ

Military service
- Branch/service: United States Army
- Years of service: 1944-1945
- Rank: Lt Colonel
- Battles/wars: WWII

Mitchell Wolfson Sr. (1900 – January 28, 1983) was an American businessman, theatre owner, politician, and founder of Wometco Enterprises.

== Biography ==
Wolfson was born in 1900 in Key West, Florida. He went to school in Key West and at Erasmus Hall High School in Brooklyn, New York, and then graduated from Columbia University. After school, he went to work for the East Coast Wholesale Corp in Miami, founded by his father in 1884.

In 1925, he partnered with his brother-in-law, Sidney Meyer, forming the Wolfson-Meyer Theater Company and began construction on a state of the art theater in downtown Miami. The Capital Theatre was completed in 1926 at the cost of $300,000 and featured an early form of air conditioning. They built the company into a business conglomerate using the portmanteau, Wometco Enterprises. In 1949, Wometco founded the first television station in Miami, WTVJ. Wometco went on to own and operate the largest chain of movie theaters in South Florida, six television stations, a cable television company, a soft drink bottling franchise, and tourist attractions including the Miami Seaquarium. At the time of his death, Wometco had over $500 million in sales.

Wolfson served two terms as city councilman in Miami Beach, Florida, before being elected its first Jewish mayor in 1943. He resigned after one term to fight Nazi Germany in World War II.

As a founder and for his later philanthropy towards Miami-Dade College, the downtown campus was named the Wolfson Campus in his honor.

== Personal life ==
He was married to Frances Meyer (December 16, 1906 – May 9, 1980); they had two sons, Mitchell Wolfson Jr. and Louis Wolfson II. Wolfson died on January 28, 1983, at Mount Sinai Medical Center in Miami.

== See also ==
- Mayors of Miami Beach
