= Mark Gibbons (politician) =

American politician (1952–2020)

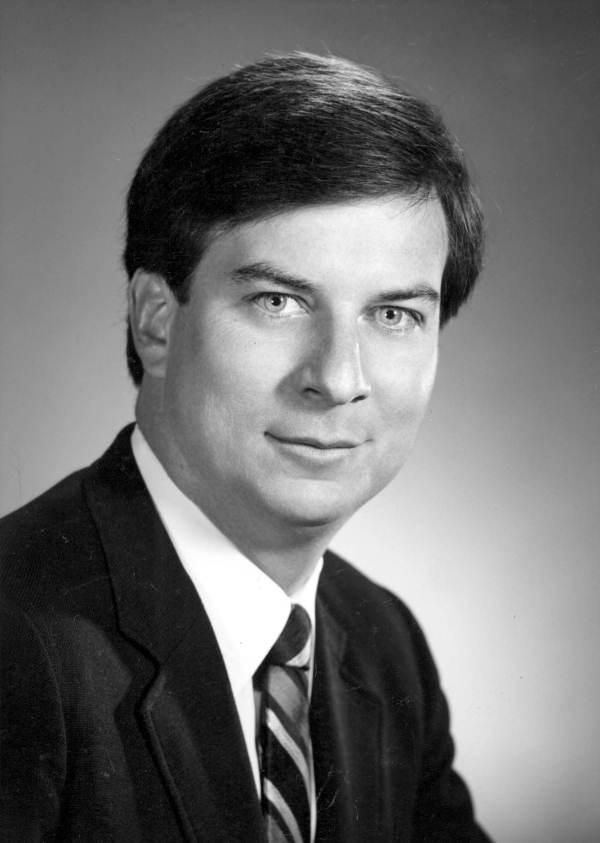

Member of the Florida House of Representatives from the 66th district
- In office November 6, 1984 – November 4, 1986
- Preceded by: Lee Moffitt
- Succeeded by: Ron Glickman

Personal details
- Born: July 30, 1952 Tampa, Florida
- Died: January 3, 2020 (aged 67) Tampa, Florida
- Party: Democratic
- Children: 3
- Relatives: Sam Gibbons (father)
- Education: University of Florida (B.S.); Florida State University College of Law (J.D.)
- Occupation: Attorney

Mark Gibbons (July 30, 1952 – January 3, 2020) was a Democratic politician from Florida who served as a member of the Florida House of Representatives from the 66th district from 1984 to 1986.

== Early life ==
Gibbons was born in Tampa, Florida, to Sam Gibbons, who represented Florida in the United States House of Representatives from 1963 to 1997. He attended the University of Florida, graduating with his bachelor's degree in 1974, and then the Florida State University College of Law, receiving his Juris Doctor in 1977. Gibbons returned to Tampa, where he worked as a prosecutor in the state attorney's office.

== Florida House of Representatives ==
In 1984, when State House Speaker Lee Moffitt declined to seek another term in the legislature, Gibbons ran to succeed him in the 66th district. He faced former State Representative George Sheldon, who had run for Congress in 1982, in the Democratic primary. Gibbons ran a quiet campaign, but received support from business groups that viewed Sheldon as too liberal, and ultimately won the primary by a wide margin, receiving 62 percent of the vote to Sheldon's 38 percent.

== 1986 lieutenant-gubernatorial campaign ==
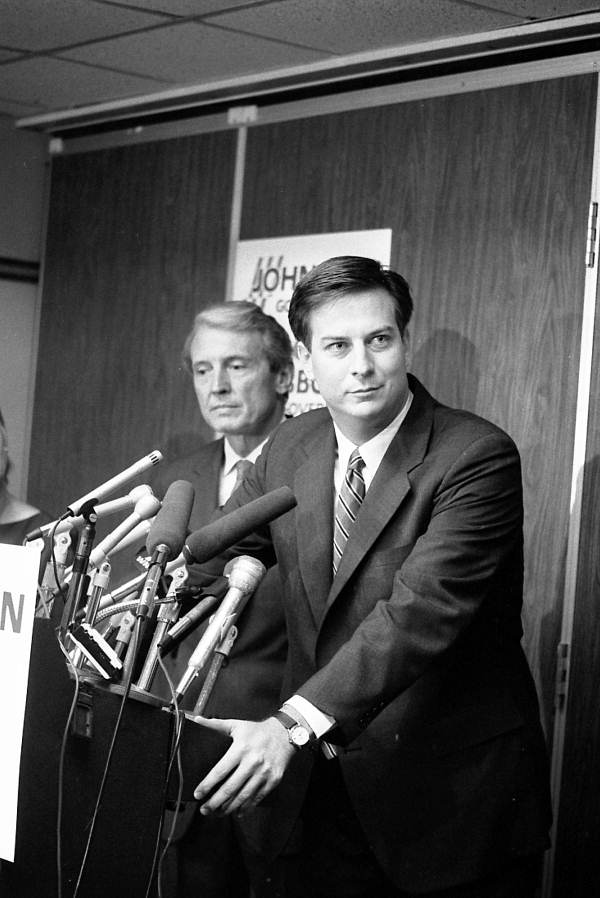
Gibbons being announced as State Senator Harry Johnston's running mate on April 11, 1986.

Gibbons planned on seeking re-election in 1986, and was interested in serving as Speaker of the State House in the 1992 legislative session. However, State Senate President Harry Johnston selected Gibbons as his running mate in the 1986 gubernatorial election after Attorney General after Jim Smith left the ticket. However, Johnston and Gibbons placed third in the primary, receiving 26 percent of the vote.

== Post-legislative career ==
After leaving the legislature, Gibbons joined the law firm of Melendi, Gibbons and Holsonback. In 1988, when State Senator Pat Frank ran for the U.S. Senate, Gibbons ran to succeed her in the 23rd district. He faced State Representative Helen Gordon Davis in the Democratic primary, and lost to her, winning 40 percent of the vote to her 60 percent.

== Death ==
Gibbons died on January 3, 2020.
