= Lewis Whitworth =

American judge and politician

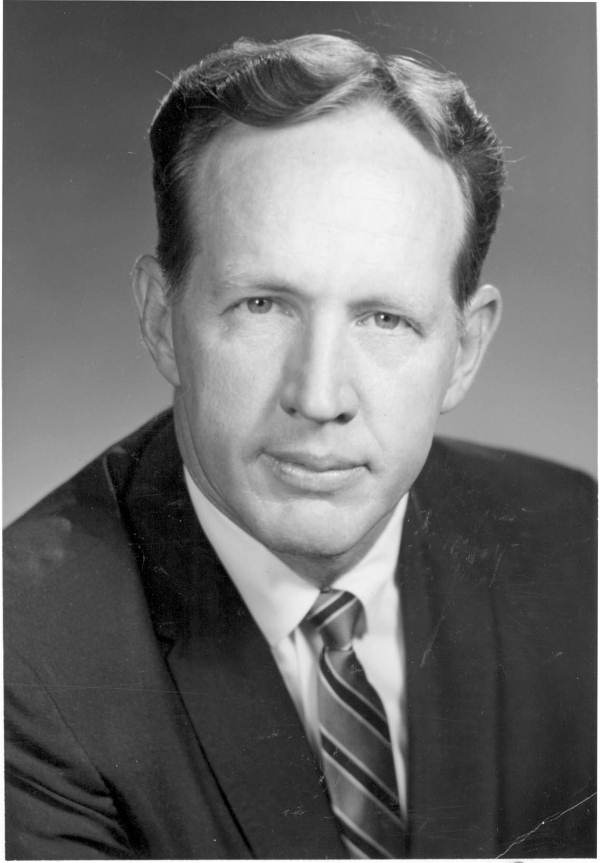
- Whitworth in 1968

Member of the Florida House of Representatives from the 94th district
- In office 1968–1972
- Preceded by: Ken Myers
- Succeeded by: Jack Miller

Personal details
- Born: July 5, 1923 Asheville, North Carolina, U.S.
- Died: December 14, 2000 (aged 77)
- Party: Democratic
- Spouse: Virginia Whitworth (died. 1999)
- Education: North Carolina State University; University of Maryland; George Washington University Law School

Lewis B. Whitworth (July 5, 1923 – December 14, 2000) was an American judge and politician. He served as a Democratic member for the 94th district of the Florida House of Representatives.

== Life and career ==
Whitworth was born in Asheville, North Carolina. He attended North Carolina State University, the University of Maryland and George Washington University Law School.

In 1968, Whitworth was elected to represent the 94th district of the Florida House of Representatives, succeeding Ken Myers. He served until 1972, when he was succeeded by Jack Miller.

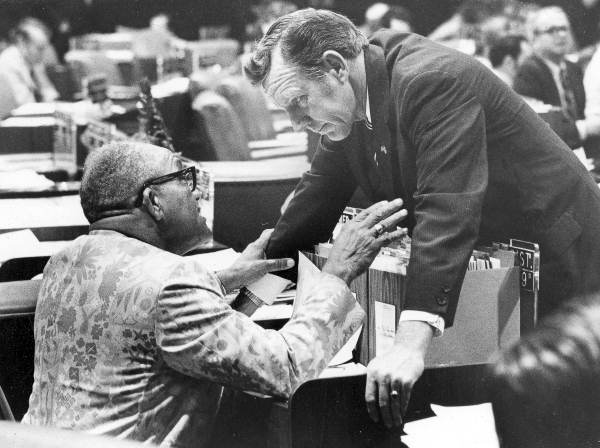
Whitworth (right) with Joe Lang Kershaw, 1975

Whitworth was a Miami-Dade County circuit court judge.

Whitworth died in December 2000 of bone cancer, at the age of 77.
