= H. Lee Moffitt Cancer Center & Research Institute =

Hospital in Florida, United States

Moffitt Cancer Center and Research Institute
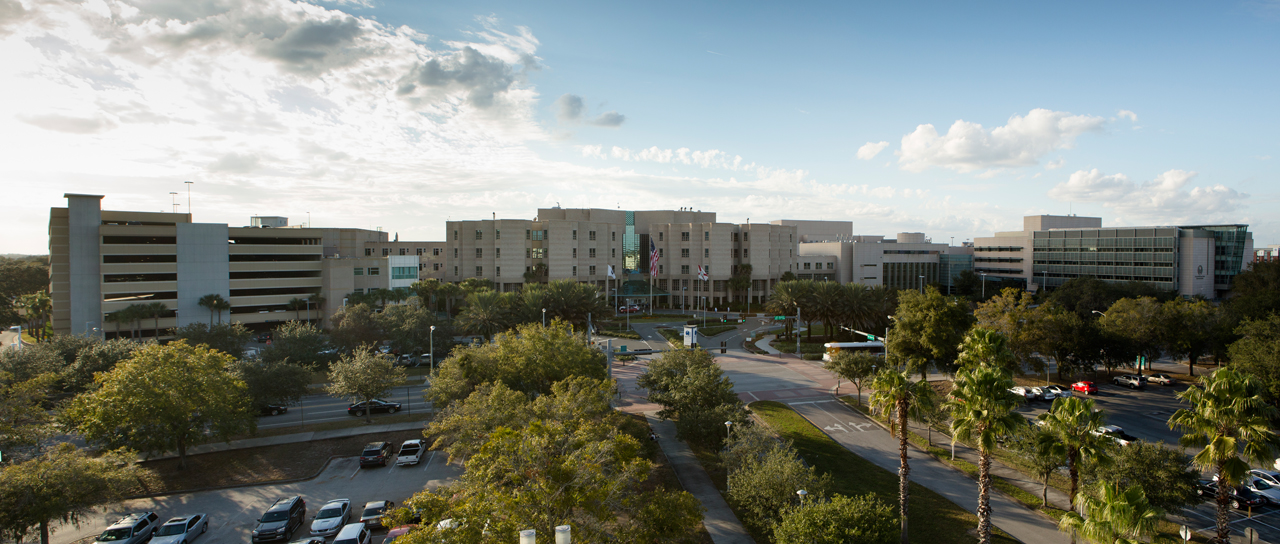
- Magnolia - Main Campus
- Type: Non-profit cancer treatment and research center
- Established: 1986
- Founder: H. Lee Moffitt
- Affiliations: National Cancer Institute-designated Comprehensive Cancer Center
- President: Patrick Hwu, MD
- Location: Tampa, Florida, US; 27.7692739°N 82.6412105°W
- Website: moffitt.org

Moffitt Cancer Center & Research Institute is a nonprofit cancer treatment and research center located in Tampa, Florida. Established in 1981 by the Florida Legislature, the hospital opened in October 1986 on the University of South Florida's campus. Moffitt is one of two National Cancer Institute-designated Comprehensive Cancer Centers based in Florida. In 2021, U.S. News & World Report ranked Moffitt Cancer Center as a top 30 cancer hospital in the United States.

== History ==
Funding for construction of the initial $70 million facility came primarily from the state of Florida's cigarette tax, while the momentum to create the center came from a cadre of legislators, physicians, educators, and business leaders who envisioned a new dimension of cancer care and research in Florida.

In late 1978, H. Lee Moffitt, a Florida state representative, recognized the need for a comprehensive cancer center within the state after several friends died from cancer. An excellent negotiator, Moffitt put his plan into motion by first proposing the idea to Hollis Boren, then dean of the University of South Florida College of Medicine. Over lunch at the Tampa Club, Moffitt proposed his idea. By dessert, Boren has signed on. "Out of that discussion came plans for a plug-shaped, multilevel cancer research teaching hospital to be built a short walk away from the USF clinics," The Tampa Times reported on February 5, 1979. Moffitt and Boren had gathered information about the need for a comprehensive cancer center, the article said, and the need was great.

Moffitt sought community support and convinced the State Legislature to fund the facility. During the center's planning phase, consultants associated with NCI-designated Cancer Centers were retained to ensure that the finished facility would be as technologically advanced and as efficiently designed as possible.

Groundbreaking ceremonies took place in January 1983. The center was incorporated in the spring of 1984 and was named for Houston Lee Moffitt, then Speaker of the State House of Representatives. The building was dedicated in October 1986 and admitted its first patients that same month.

In 1990, the acquisition of the Research Center building across from the Cancer Center enhanced the recruitment of scientists, clinicians, and support staff, and expanded Moffitt's vision beyond the original structure. The Moffitt Research Center became the focal point for basic and translational cancer research, with the overriding goal to produce discoveries that could be translated quickly from the bench to the patient's bedside. The Florida Legislature allocated $12 million for renovation and equipment for this 100,000-square-foot (9,300 m^{2}) structure, and the Moffitt Research Center became fully operational in 1995. In 1999, 48,000 square feet (4,500 m^{2}) of basic research lab space was added to the Moffitt Research Center at a cost of $11 million to house the growing need for additional scientists.

In 2022 the Florida Legislature approved more than $706 million for a new H. Lee Moffitt Cancer Center and Research Institute campus in Pasco County. $600 million in state funding will be distributed in yearly in $20 million yearly increments for each of the next 30 years.

== Organization ==
On June 10, 1998, in a ceremonial signing at Moffitt, Florida governor Lawton Chiles approved a legislative initiative to fund construction of the Moffitt Tower Project, which opened in April 2003, adding more than 350,000 square feet (33,000 m^{2}) of new space. This expansion includes the Vincent A. Stabile Research Building, eponymously named in recognition of the largest private donation ever made to the Cancer Center. The new construction also includes an expansion of the Moffitt Clinic. In addition to new research laboratories, which nearly double the cancer center's research capabilities, the new facilities include a digital imaging center, and a new infusion center.

In 1991, John Ruckdeschel, assumed the position of center director, president and CEO. Under Ruckdeschel's leadership, Moffitt became a National Cancer Institute (NCI) Comprehensive Cancer Center. In 2017, the NCI renewed Moffitt's Cancer Center Support Grant for another five years. Currently, Moffitt receives more than $50 million annually in peer-reviewed grant monies.

In 2002, Ruckdeschel stepped down, and William Dalton, became Moffitt's third president, CEO and center director.

In 2008, the University of Florida and Shands at UF formed a partnership with Moffitt to develop programs in cancer care, research and prevention.

In 2009, the University of South Florida and Moffitt were awarded $6 million in federal grant money to create the Center for Equal Health, a five-year partnership focused on addressing issues of cancer health disparities.

Scientific programs include molecular oncology;, drug discovery; immunology; experimental therapeutics; computational biology of cancer; health outcomes; and behavior and risk assessment, detection and intervention. It also serves as the site for the Bill and Beverly Young National Functional Genomics Center, funded by the U.S. Department of Defense.

Moffitt Cancer Center is affiliated with the University of South Florida Morsani College of Medicine and provides education to medical students and residency training as well.

On June 24, 2011, Moffitt Cancer Center opened the first blood and marrow transplant (BMT) clinic in Puerto Rico.

On July 1, 2011, Moffitt Cancer Center opened a new 50,000-square-foot (4,600 m^{2}) satellite facility at International Plaza. The building replaced Moffitt's former outpatient center at Tampa General Hospital.

In July 2012, William Dalton, became the CEO of M2Gen and Moffitt's new Personalized Medicine Institute. Alan List, who previously served as Moffitt's executive vice president/physician-in-chief and president of the Moffitt Medical Group, succeeded Dalton as CEO and president. Thomas Sellers assumed the role of center director.

In February 2013, Moffitt began construction of a $74.2 million outpatient facility on the cancer center's 30-acre (1,300,000 sq ft) property on N McKinley Drive, about a mile from Moffitt's main campus.

In November 2015, Moffitt opens the McKinley Outpatient Center. The six-story, 207,000-square-foot (19,200 m^{2}) facility at 10920 N McKinley Drive is located about a mile from the main campus. Services on the site include the skin and breast cancer clinics, four operating rooms, an imaging suite, research labs, space for blood draws and a Publix pharmacy.

In July 2017, Moffitt and Memorial Healthcare announce a partnership to establish a comprehensive blood and marrow transplant cellular therapy program for South Florida residents. The alliance brings the renowned cancer center's access to research, clinical trials, and comprehensive treatment to leukemia, lymphoma and multiple myeloma patients.

In August 2020, Moffitt named Patrick Hwu, a tumor immunologist with 33 years of oncology experience, its new president and CEO.

== Research and Treatment ==
Through clinical trials, Jeffrey Weber, director of the Donald A. Adam Comprehensive Melanoma Research Center at Moffitt, and researchers at Moffitt Cancer Center discovered two monotherapy drugs – Mekinist (trametinib) and Tafinlar (dabrafenib) – can be safely combined to overcome or delay treatment resistance for a large percentage of melanoma patients with a specific gene mutation. Approved by the FDA in January 2014, Mekinist in combination with Tafinlar is one of the biggest advancements in melanoma treatment in the past 30 years.

In August 2011, the U.S. Food and Drug Administration (FDA) approved the drug vemurafenib (Zelboraf) for metastatic melanoma patients who test positive for a specific gene mutation. Moffitt Cancer Center conducted a registration trial using the drug manufactured by Genentech, a member of the Roche Group.

Anna Giuliano, director of Moffitt's Center for Infection Research in Cancer, led two studies on human papillomavirus (HPV) infection in men. Her work strengthened the Food & Drug Administration (FDA) recommendation for boys and men to receive HPV vaccinations and provided useful data for the development of realistic cost-effectiveness models for male HPV vaccination internationally.

In September 2014, a new cancer immunotherapy for melanoma patients called Keytruda became the first anti-PD-1 (programmed death receptor-1) therapy approved in the United States. Jeffrey Weber, director of the Donald A. Adam Comprehensive Melanoma Research Center of Excellence at Moffitt, was one of the lead investigators of the clinical trial which led to the drug receiving breakthrough status from the FDA.

In January 2016, researchers at Moffitt teamed up with the state of Florida in a study to see if making fruits and vegetables available to children who otherwise may not have them readily available can decrease their risk of cancer.

In October 2017, the Food and Drug Administration announced the approval of Yescarta™, a revolutionary new immunotherapy for adult patients with diffuse large B cell lymphoma, a form of non-Hodgkin's lymphoma. Yescarta is a Chimeric Antigen Receptor (CAR) T cell therapy, also known as CAR-T. Moffitt Cancer Center's Frederick Locke, is the co-lead investigator of the pivotal ZUMA-1 clinical trial that tested the new therapy, which is manufactured by Kite, a Gilead company.

In February 2024, the U.S. Food and Drug Administration approved a first-of-its-kind immunotherapy pioneered at Moffitt for patients with advanced melanoma. Moffitt was a driving force in getting lifileucel (Amtagvi) FDA-approved for the treatment of adult patients with unresectable or metastatic melanoma previously treated with a PD-1 blocking antibody, and if BRAF V600 mutation positive, a BRAF inhibitor with or without a MEK inhibitor.

== Notable patients ==
- Kirstie Alley (1951-2022), American actress, Scientologist
- Casey DeSantis (1980 - ), Television Show Host and First Lady of Florida
- Keylla Hernández (1973-2018), Puerto Rican television reporter

== Locations ==
Moffit Cancer Center is located on the campus of the University of South Florida in north Tampa. The center includes the hospital, Muriel Rothman Building (clinic), Vincent A. Stabile Research Building and the Moffitt Research Center.

Moffitt at International Plaza is a 50,000-square-foot full service outpatient facility near Tampa International Airport. The facility includes physician office visits, infusion services, radiation and radiology.

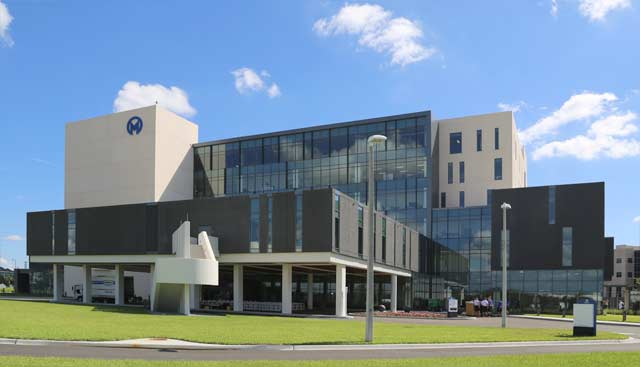
McKinley Outpatient Center

Moffitt Cancer Center Prevention Research, Fowler Campus, located in north Tampa, is a facility that practices research for prevention and early detection of cancer.

The Richard M. Schulze Family Foundation Outpatient Center at McKinley Campus, 10920 N. McKinley Drive, includes the breast and skin cancer clinics, infusion center, research labs and four surgery suites.

Moffitt Malignant Hematology & Cellular Therapy at Memorial Healthcare System, 801 N. Flamingo Road, Pembroke Pines, FL, provides a comprehensive Blood and Marrow Transplant Cellular Therapy Program for South Florida residents.

Moffitt Cancer Center at Wesley Chapel, 2590 Healing Way, Wesley Chapel, FL, is a 28,000-square-foot outpatient facility.

Moffitt McKinley Hospital, 10901 N. McKinley Drive, Tampa, FL, is an inpatient surgical hospital located on Moffitt's McKinley Campus.

Moffitt Cancer Center at Port Tampa Bay, 651 Channelside Drive, Tampa, FL, is a community outreach and education center near downtown Tampa.

== Recognition ==
- From 1999 to 2019, Moffitt has been ranked one of "America's Best Hospitals" for cancer by U.S. News & World Report.
- In 2014, Becker's Hospital Review includes Moffitt in the 100 Accountable Care Organizations to Know.
- In 2015, Moffitt earned a Magnet designation for nursing excellence, granted by the American Nurses Credentialing Center (ANCC), the credentialing body of the American Nurses Association.
- In 2015, Becker's Hospital Review recognizes Moffitt's president and CEO Dr. Alan List in its "100 Physician Leaders of Hospitals and Health Systems."
- Moffitt Cancer Center was named 2017 Nonprofit of the Year by the Tampa Bay Business Journal. Moffitt was also recognized as the category winner in the Health & Human Services category.
- In 2018, Moffitt was named LGBTQ Healthcare Equality Leader by the Human Rights Campaign Foundation. The cancer center was also named one of Working Mother Magazine's 100 Best Companies for 10th time.
- In 2023, Moffitt was ranked No. 10 in the nation and the top-ranked cancer hospital in Florida and the Southeast in Newsweek’s 2023 list of “America’s Best Cancer Hospitals.”

== See also ==
- Media related to Moffitt Cancer Center and Research Institute at Wikimedia Commons
- University of South Florida
- University of South Florida College of Medicine
