= Wolfsonian–FIU =

The Wolfsonian–Florida International University
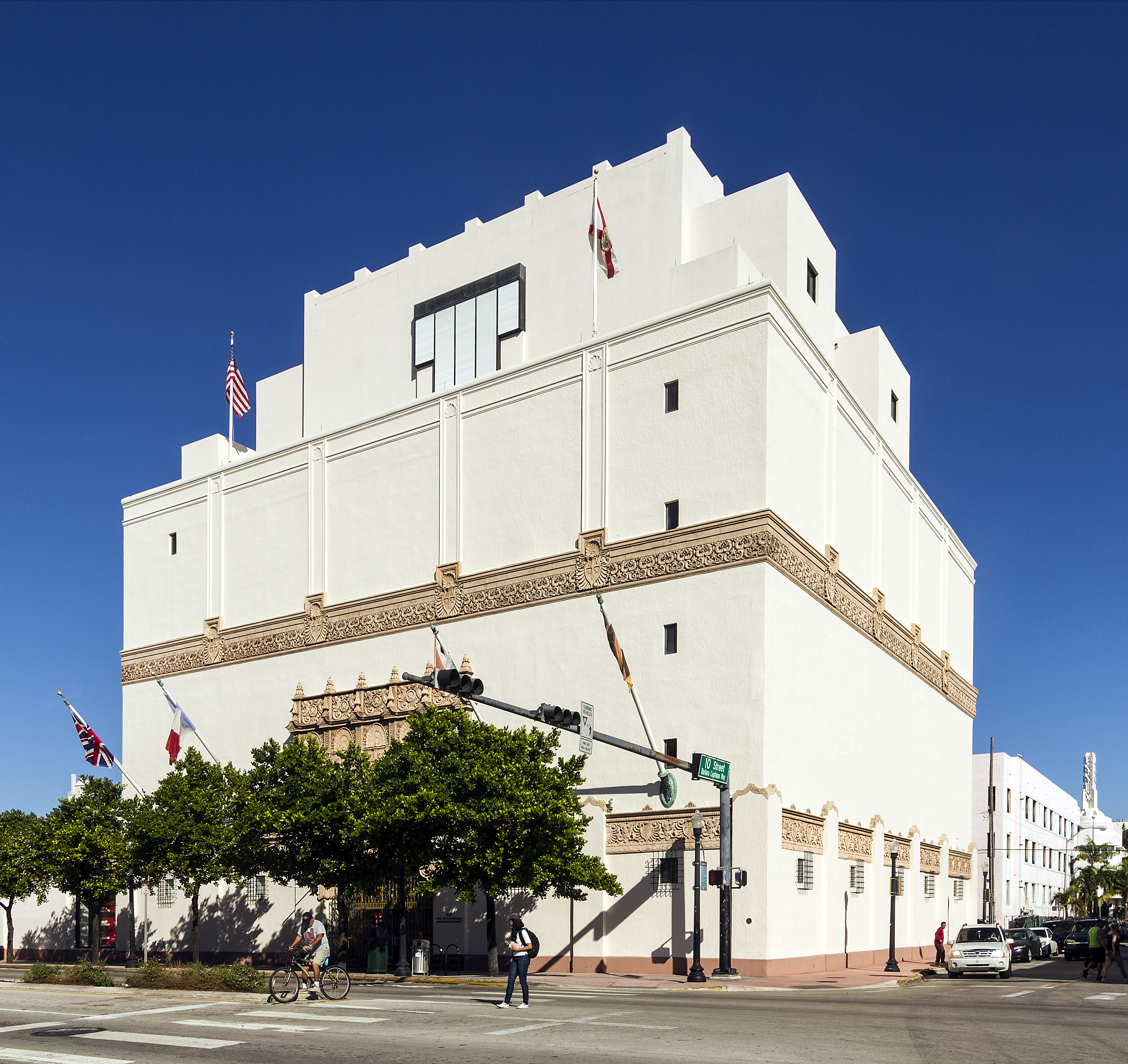
- Established: 1986, incorporated as an FIU department in 1997
- Location: 1001 Washington Avenue; Miami Beach, Florida, United States
- Coordinates: 25.78084°N 80.13257°W
- Type: Art museum
- Founders: Mitchell Wolfson, Jr.
- Director: Michael Hughes
- Website: wolfsonian.org

The Wolfsonian–Florida International University or The Wolfsonian–FIU, located in the heart of the Art Deco District of Miami Beach, Florida, is a museum, library and research center with collections intended to illustrate the persuasive power of art and design. Since 1997, The Wolfsonian has been a division within Florida International University.

The Wolfsonian's two collections comprise approximately 180,000 pieces from the period 1885 to 1945—the height of the Industrial Revolution until the end of the Second World War—in a variety of media, including: furniture; industrial-design objects; works in glass; ceramics; metal; rare books; periodicals; ephemera; works on paper; paintings; textiles; and medals. The museum is an affiliate within the Smithsonian Affiliations program, sharing affiliation with the Frost Art Museum.

The countries most strongly represented are Germany, Great Britain, Italy, the Netherlands, and the United States. There are also significant holdings from a number of other countries, including Austria, Czechoslovakia, France, Hungary, Japan, and the former Soviet Union. Among the collection's strengths are: the British Arts & Crafts movement; Dutch and Italian variants of the Art Nouveau style; American industrial design; objects and publications from world's fairs; propaganda from the First and Second World Wars and the Spanish Civil War; New Deal graphic and decorative arts; avant-garde book design; and publications and design drawings relating to architecture.

== History ==
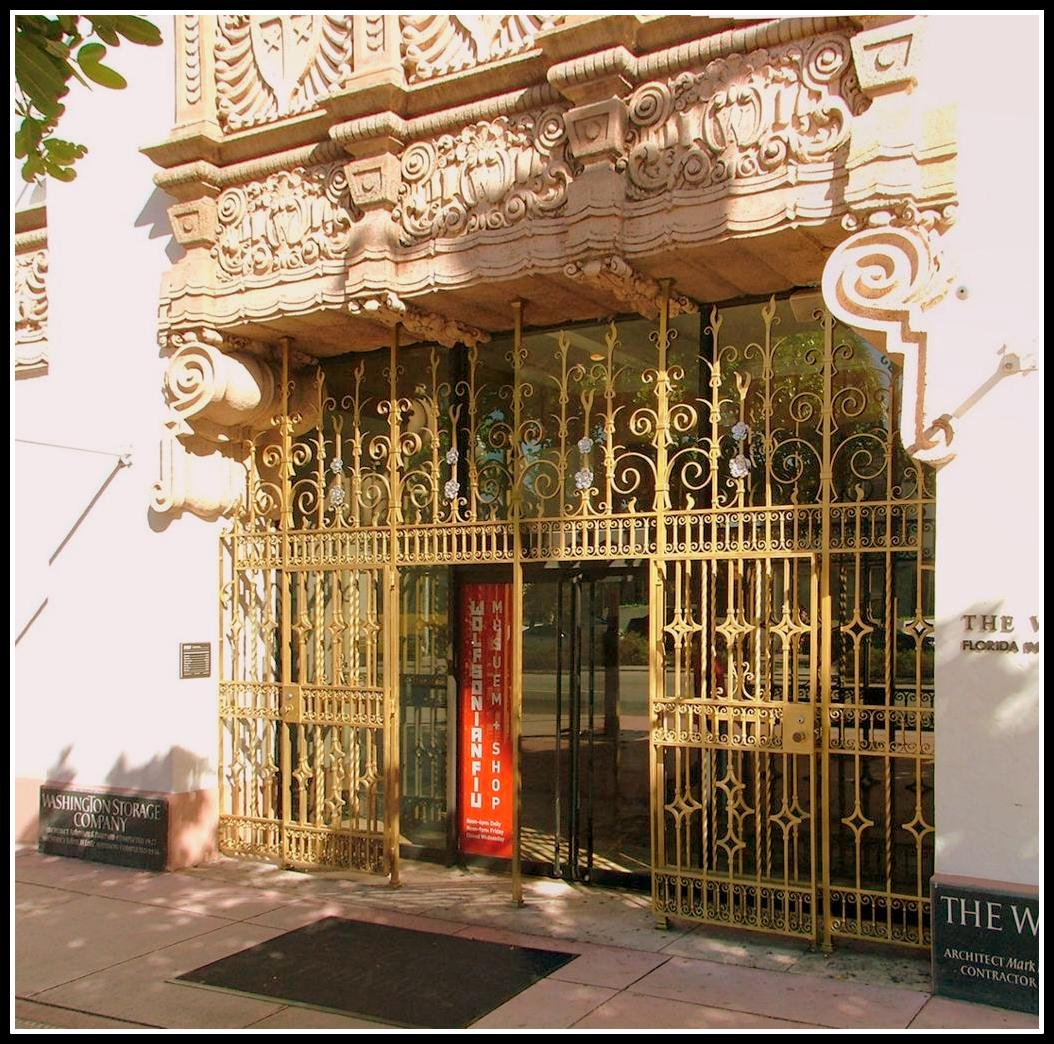
Entry to The Wolfsonian–FIU from Washington Avenue. The carved sandstone frieze above the entrance is typical of Spanish Renaissance and Baroque-revival architecture.

The Wolfsonian is named for Mitchell Wolfson Jr., a Miami Beach native and collector and expert on modern design, architecture, and the decorative arts. Wolfson began amassing much of what is now The Wolfsonian's collections of rare books and objects in the 1970s. He began to store his collection at the Washington Storage Company facility on Washington Avenue in Miami Beach, which had been operating since 1926. In 1986, with 90% of the facility's storage space occupied by his collection, he bought the building and established The Wolfsonian Foundation in order to oversee the collection and make it available to researchers and scholars for research. He hired Peggy Loar as the Foundation's founding director, who brought in experts in the fields to begin to document, research, and publish what the collection held.

In 1992, Wolfson hired the architect Mark Hampton to expand and renovate the Washington Storage Company building and convert it into a museum and research center. Hampton, in collaboration with architect William Kearns, transformed the building to include a sleekly modernist lobby, museum café and shop, and, upstairs, permanent and temporary galleries dramatically arranged around light wells, a library, offices, and storage. The museum opened to the public in 1995.

Loar departed the museum in fall 1996 and the Foundation Board hired Cathy Leff, then-vice president of The Wolfson Initiative Corporation and executive editor and publisher of The Journal of Decorative and Propaganda Arts, to step in as interim director. On behalf of Wolfson and the Board, Cathy Leff negotiated the gifting of the collection and its state-of-the-art museum facility to Florida International University. The acquisition of this gift was approved by the Florida State Legislature in 1997, and The Wolfsonian officially became a department of the Florida International University in Miami in July of that year. Since 1995, The Wolfsonian has exhibited both selections from the collection in permanent galleries as well as temporary exhibitions drawn from its collections and loaned from outside collections. As part of its commitment to support the arts, The Wolfsonian has also hosted temporary exhibitions of work by contemporary artists. It also maintains a teaching gallery at the Frost Art Museum on the Modesto Maidique Campus of FIU in western Miami, where FIU faculty often co-curate shows drawing on items in The Wolfsonian collections in conjunction with their classes. It regularly serves as a venue for community engagement with the arts, including children's programs, lectures and conferences, contemporary art shows, and musical performances. It offers fellowships for visiting scholars and researchers and actively supports the use of its collections by FIU classes.

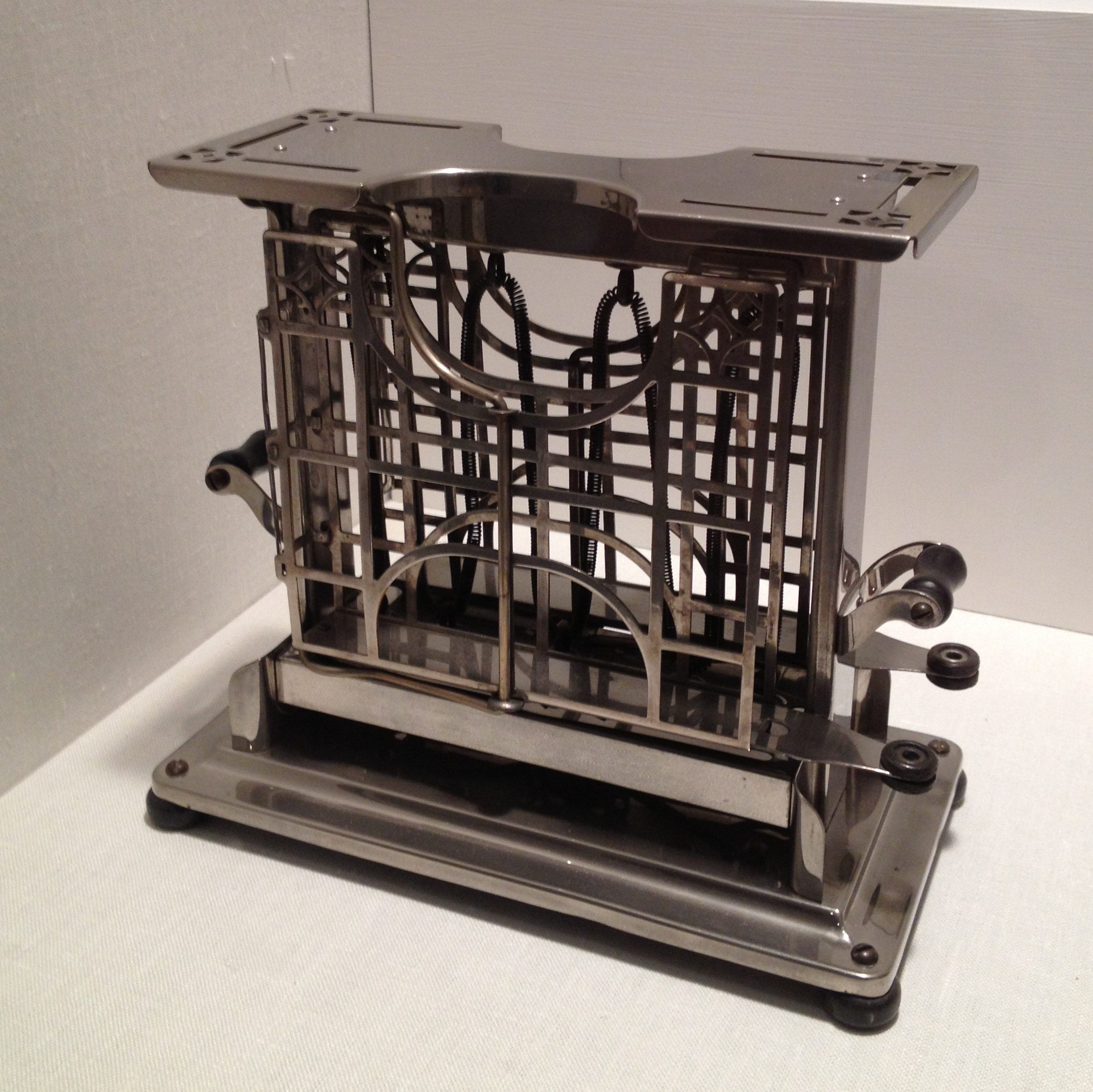
Toaster on display in the Wolfsonian–FIU's permanent galleries

In 2009, The Wolfsonian–FIU, which is located several miles away from FIU's two large campuses in western Miami and the northern end of Biscayne Bay, received a three-year grant from the Andrew W. Mellon Foundation to strengthen its ties with FIU faculty and staff; the Mellon Foundation awarded the museum another three-year grant beginning in 2012, to run through 2015. The museum has used the awards to expand its grant programs to faculty to incorporate the collections into their classes, provide fellowships for graduate students at FIU to research the collections for theses and dissertations and publications, hold scholarly conferences, host research fellows from outside FIU working on relevant topics to the collections, and expand opportunities for FIU faculty to help curate exhibitions from the museum's collections.

In 2012, The Wolfsonian completed a new strategic plan that would guide its next level of development, as it had successfully transitioned from a private collection to a reputable museum and research center. In recognition of its new plan and to encourage greater access to the collection, physically and online, it was awarded a $5 million grant from the John S and James L. Knight Foundation. This involves the renovation of the museum's main building on Washington Avenue and offsite storage in order to improve access to the collections by both FIU faculty and students and outside researchers. These changes are projected to take place over the next several years. It is expected that both the Mellon grants and the Knight grant will also facilitate the continued documentation of the collection and its dissemination in digital form online to an even broader public. Mitchell Wolfson has continued to collect after donating a large portion of his holdings to The Wolfsonian. He maintains a separate but very similarly themed private object and library collection in downtown Miami, known as the Mitchell Wolfson, Jr. Study and Research Centre, the contents of which will eventually be acquired by The Wolfsonian and integrated into its collections. The grants that The Wolfsonian has received recently are intended to help accommodate the absorption of these objects and printed materials over the next several years. Cathy Leff remained director of the museum until April 1, 2014. Tim Rodgers was the Museum's Director from July 1, 2015, to 2020. Casey Steadman succeeded as acting director and was named Director in October 2020. Casey Steadman joined the Museum in 2013 as deputy director of Business Affairs.

== Locations ==
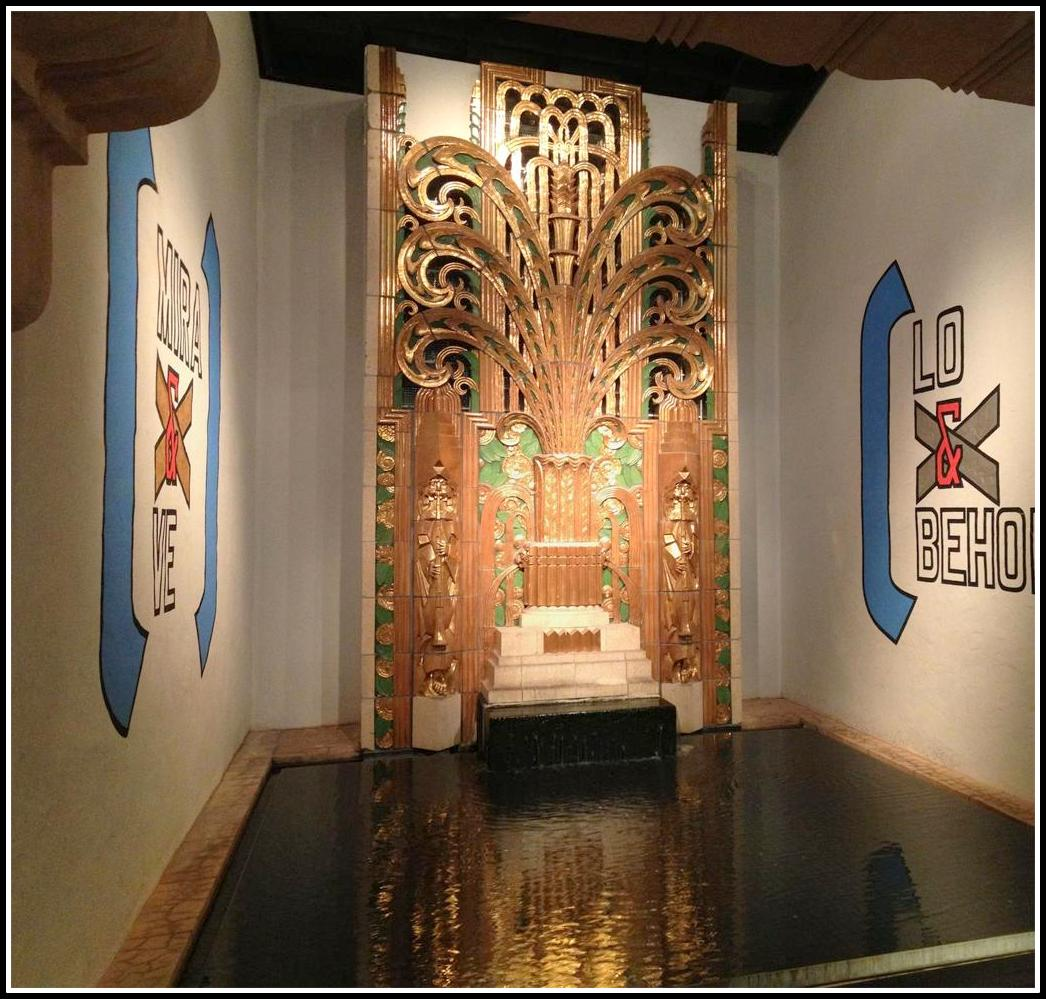
Tiles of the façade of the Norris Theater, Norristown, Pennsylvania, built in 1929–30. The building was demolished in 1982, and these pieces were salvaged and have been reassembled in the lobby of The Wolfsonian as the backdrop to this fountain.

The Wolfsonian is considered one of the seven campuses of FIU.

Its facilities consist of the main building at 1001 Washington Avenue, the former Washington Storage Company building. The lower three floors of the structure were originally constructed by the architectural firm of Robertson & Patterson in the Spanish Renaissance style in 1927, then the popular choice for structures in South Florida, largely due to the region's long and well-known Spanish colonial heritage. Two floors were added by architect Robert M. Little in 1936. The building retained its five-floor configuration until 1986, when Mitchell Wolfson Jr. bought it.

The storage facility was designed with a tall ground floor space and large main entry to accommodate cars. It was envisioned that automobiles carrying large pieces of furniture would drive through the main gate into what is now the lobby, where their contents would be unloaded and placed in a freight elevator (the first in Miami Beach and still in operation) which would take the large items to the storage levels on the upper floors. There was no storage space on the ground floor in order to protect the items in storage from potential flooding during rainstorms and especially hurricanes. The building contains thick concrete walls in order to maintain a cool, constant temperature and to keep out humidity. It was principally used by wealthy northerners from New York, Philadelphia, Boston, and other major cities who maintained winter vacation homes in Miami and, before the days of air-conditioning, needed space to store their home furnishings during the summer to protect them from the hot and humid Florida weather.

In 1992, the structure was renovated and expanded to transform it into a combined museum and research center. Two more floors, the sixth and seventh levels, were added by Mark Hampton and William S. Kearns. The fifth floor was converted into permanent gallery space for The Wolfsonian's collections, while the sixth and seventh floors house temporary exhibitions. The fourth floor contains storage space for part of the object collections. The third floor contains the Wolfsonian's research library of some 60,000 items, including rare books and periodicals, pamphlets, and other printed materials and ephemera, including items as diverse as brochures, prints, timetables, advertising flyers, artist portfolios, calendars, and matchbook covers. The ground floor contains the lobby and museum café, bookstore and gift shop. Many parts of the building include permanent decorative and functional elements from the original Washington Storage Company, such as its doors to storage vaults, as well as items salvaged from other destroyed structures and reinstalled in the Wolfsonian.

Most of the Wolfsonian's vast object collections of some 120,000 items are stored offsite in an old Bell Telephone building. The items housed there are currently only accessible to non-museum personnel by special request, though it is believed that the museum's long-term plans are to renovate its offsite storage to make these collections more available to FIU students, faculty, and outside researchers. It is possible that such renovations will include the addition of classroom space.

== Principal collections ==
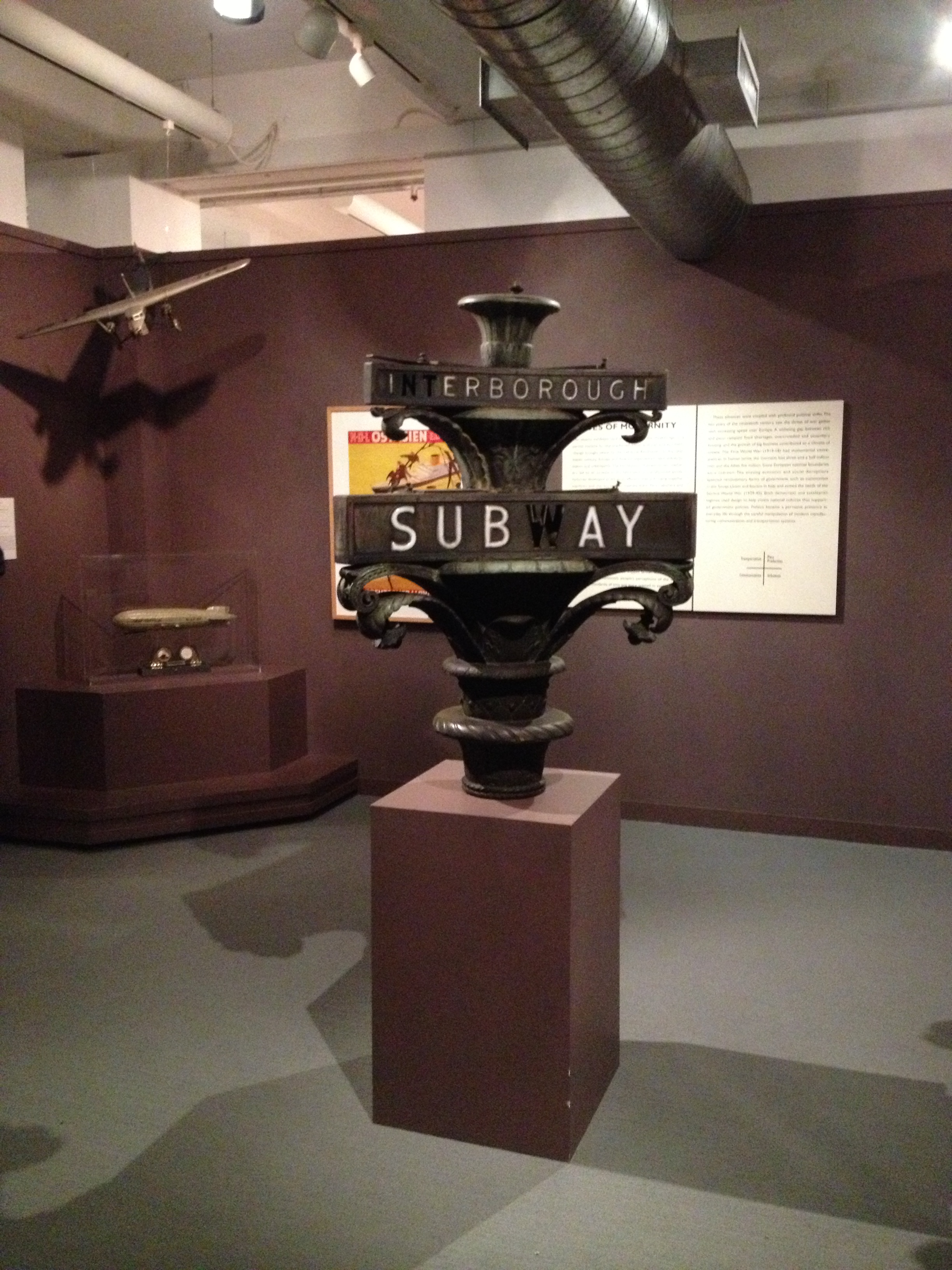
Interior view of part of the permanent galleries at the Wolfsonian

The Wolfsonian consists of two collections: its library collection, which consists of some 60,000 smaller-format works on paper, and the object collection, which includes all three-dimensional objects and large-format works on paper, such as posters, as well as a large collection of modern paintings. Most of the collections at The Wolfsonian were donated by Mitchell Wolfson, Jr., but the museum also holds large numbers of items acquired through other donations, purchases, and long-term loans.

The Wolfsonian library is non-circulating, but it is open regularly to researchers and scholars, though scheduling an appointment is necessary. Their holdings are entirely searchable through the catalog on The Wolfsonian's website. The object collections not on view are available by appointment only and subject to accessibility. Its holdings are only partially searchable online via the museum's collection of digital images. Contact with the museum staff is required to learn the full extent of what the object collection contains.

The flags that fly from poles above the main entrance on Washington Avenue are those of the countries most prominently represented in The Wolfsonian's collections.

Between them, the two collections' holdings can be divided into several principal areas:

- American Industrial Design – posters, graphic designs, patent models, trade catalogs and samples, as well as objects such as cameras, clocks, radios, and phonographs. Designers include Donald Deskey, Walter Dorwin Teague, Kem Weber, and John Vassos
- British Arts and Crafts Movement – works by C. R. Ashbee, Christopher Dresser, Ernest Gimson, Charles Rennie Mackintosh, William Morris, M. H. Baillie Scott. Said to be the largest such collection outside the United Kingdom
- Dutch and Italian Art Nouveau (Nieuwe Kunst and Stile Floreale) – objects, period rooms, and a large collection of Nieuwe Kunst bookbindings
- German design reform – objects by the Darmstadt Art Colony, Vereinigte Werkstätten in Munich, and Deutscher Werkbund
- New Deal America – designs produced by the Works Progress Administration (WPA) and the Federal Art Project
- Political propaganda – prints, posters, drawings, books, and magazines. Propaganda from Russia/USSR, Czechoslovakia, Hungary, and Spain are well represented. The British, Dutch, German, Italian, and American holdings may be the most comprehensive in the United States.
- Transportation and travel – objects relating to ocean liners, airplanes, zeppelins, and trains
- World's Fairs and expositions – furnishings, sculpture, paintings, and ephemera from World's Fairs since 1851. Prominently represented expositions include the 1902 Prima Esposizione Internazionale d'Arte Decorativa Moderna in Turin; the 1925 Exposition Internationale des Arts Décoratifs et Industriels Modernes in Paris; the 1933 Century of Progress Exposition in Chicago; and the 1939 World's Fair in New York.

The Wolfsonian–FIU has a sister museum, the Wolfsoniana, in Nervi, Italy, also founded by Wolfson. The Wolfsoniana is housed in a renovated school overlooking the sea, and is administered by the City of Genoa and the Region of Liguria. It features mainly Italian fine and decorative arts, design, and architecture.

== Publications ==
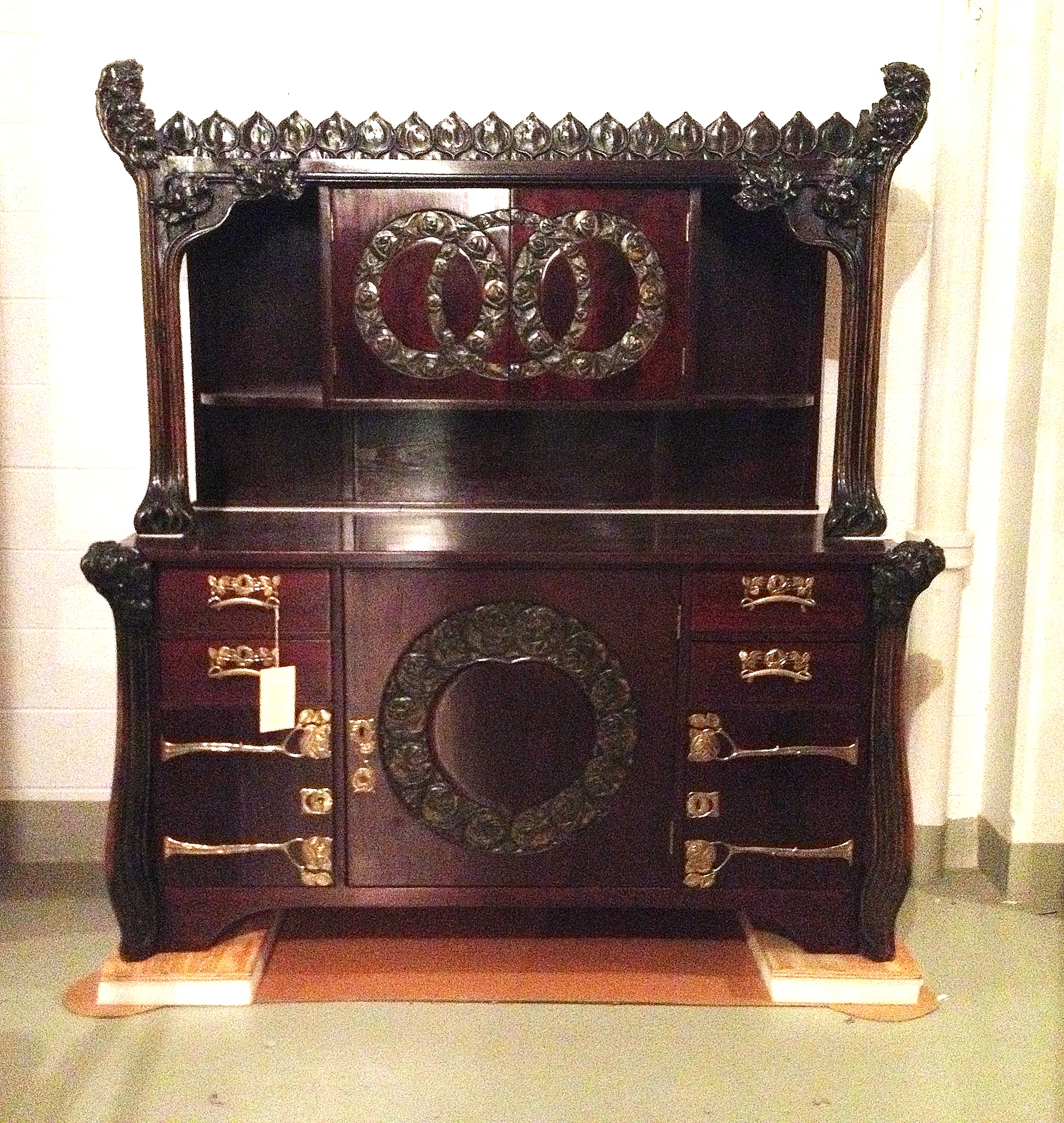
Austrian Art Nouveau sideboard in The Wolfsonian's collection, seen in offsite storage

The Wolfsonian has published catalogues of some of its exhibitions and parts of its collections, and there are plans to produce publications more frequently of future museum exhibitions. In addition, it is responsible for the publication of The Journal of Decorative and Propaganda Arts, which appears irregularly.

Some of The Wolfsonian's exhibition publications include:

- Gabriel P. Weisberg, Stile Floreale: The Cult of Nature in Italian Design (1988).
- Elinoor Bergvelt, et al., Designing Modernity: The Arts of Reform and Persuasion, 1885–1945, ed. Wendy Kaplan (1995).
- Wendy Kaplan, Leading "The Simple Life": The Arts and Crafts Movement in Britain, 1880–1910 (1999).
- Marianne Lamonaca, et al., Tokyo: The Imperial Capital, ed. Lamonaca (2003).
- Marianne Lamonaca and Sarah Schleuning, Weapons of Mass Dissemination: The Propaganda of War (2004).
- Robin Bachin, et al., Grand Hotels of the Jazz Age: The Hotels of Schultze & Weaver, ed. Marianne Lamonaca and Jonathan Mogul (2005).
- Sarah Schleuning and Jeremy Aynsley, Moderne: Fashioning The French Interior, ed. Marianne Lamonaca (2008).
- Nathaniel Cadle, et al., Styled for the Road: The Art of Automobile Design, 1908–1948, ed. Marianne Lamonaca (2009).
- Timothy Alborn, et al., Speed Limits, ed. Jeffrey Schnapp (2009).
- Marianne Lamonaca, et al., Liberty, Equality, Fraternity, ed. Lamonaca (2011).
- Matthew Abess, et al., Esther Shalev-Gerz: Describing Labor, ed. Abess and Marianne Lamonaca (2012).

== Wolfsonian-sponsored conferences and symposia ==
- Creator, Collector, Catalyst: The University Art Museum in the Twenty-First Century, December 2006
- The Wolfsonian Education Symposium
- 2008 IMLS WebWise Conference

== See also ==
- List of design museums
- Mitchell Wolfson Jr.
- Wolfsoniana
