= John Ruckdeschel =

American oncologist (born 1946)

- Born: January 5, 1946 (age 79); Newport, Rhode Island
- Occupation(s): Physician, Professor of Medicine, Editor, CEO
- Years active: 1970s–present

John C. Ruckdeschel (born January 5, 1946) is an American oncologist who has written 160 peer reviewed articles.

He obtained his bachelor's degree from the Rensselaer Polytechnic Institute and later on got his medical degree from Albany Medical College. He received training at Johns Hopkins University and Beth Israel Hospital where he was a resident. He was a fellow of the National Cancer Institute and a decade later became faculty member of the second alma mater. In 1991 he became the director and CEO of Moffitt Cancer Center in Tampa where he worked with Terrance Albrecht. and ten years later held the same position at the Karmanos Cancer Institute in Detroit, Michigan. In 2009, he tried to do the same thing at the Nevada Cancer Institute and three years later became medical director at the Intermountain Healthcare in Salt Lake City. During the same years he was a chairman of both Eastern Cooperative Oncology Group and the executive officer of the Lung Cancer Study Group.
