= Kamela Gissendanner =

American basketball player (born 1985)

Personal information
- Born: July 27, 1985 (age 41) Clairton, Pennsylvania, U.S.
- Listed height: 6 ft 1 in (1.85 m)
- Listed weight: 178 lb (81 kg)

Career information
- High school: Clairton (Clairton, Pennsylvania)
- College: NC State (2003–2004); Penn State (2004–2008)
- Position: Forward
- Number: 25

Career history

Playing
- 2008: Los Angeles Sparks

Coaching
- 2009–2011: Saint Francis (PA) (assistant)
- 2012–2017: La Roche
- 2017–2018: La Salle (assistant)
- 2018–2025: La Roche
- 2026–present: Saint Vincent

Career highlights
- Third-team All-Big Ten (2008); 4× AMCC Coach of the Year (2013, 2018, 2019, 2023)
- Stats at Basketball Reference

Kamela Teresa Gissendanner (born July 27, 1985) is an American former professional basketball player who played for the Los Angeles Sparks of the Women's National Basketball Association (WNBA). She played college basketball for the NC State Wolfpack and Penn State Lady Lions. She is currently the head coach of the La Roche Redhawks women's basketball team.

== Early life ==
Kamela Teresa Gissendanner was born on July 27, 1985, in Clairton, Pennsylvania. She attended Clairton High School in Clairton. She was a three-time first team All-State selection from 2001 to 2003, and also a three-time Street & Smith honorable mention All-American from 2000 to 2002. She helped the team win consecutive WPIAL Class A state titles in 2001 and 2002. Gissendanner set the school's all-time scoring record with 2,703 points. The All Star Girls Report rated her as the 10th best wing in the country. She was also the Associated Press small school player of the year her senior season in 2003.

Gissendanner also played for the junior USA national team in 2002, earning USA Today junior All-American honors.

== College career ==
Gissendanner played college basketball for the NC State Wolfpack as a guard during her freshman year in 2003–04, appearing in 13 games and averaging 1.1 points per game.

In 2004, she transferred to play for the Penn State Lady Lions as a guard. She redshirted the 2004–05 season. Gissendanner played in 29 games in 2005–06, averaging 14.8 points, 3.9 rebounds, and 2.3 assists. She appeared in 31 games during the 2006–07 season, averaging 12.8 points, 3.1 rebounds, and 1.7 assists per game. She played in 31 games her senior year in 2007–08, averaging 13.4 points, 6.5 rebounds, 1.3 assists, and 1.1 steals, earning third-team All-Big Ten honors from the coaches and honorable mention All-Big Ten honors from the media. Gissendanner majored in rehabilitation services at Penn State.

== Professional career ==
After going undrafted in the 2008 WNBA draft, Gissendanner signed with the Los Angeles Sparks on April 14, 2008. She played in two games for the Sparks during the 2008 season as a forward, totaling 0 points and 2 rebounds in 14 minutes, before being waived on June 27, 2008.

Gissendanner also played one season in the Kvinnenligaen League in Norway, leading the league in scoring and winning league MVP. She spent one season in the Cassovia League in Slovakia as well. She also spent time playing in Puerto Rico.

== Coaching career ==
Gissendanner was an assistant coach for the Saint Francis Red Flash women's basketball team during the 2009–10 and 2010–11 seasons.

She was the head coach of the La Roche Redhawks women's basketball team from the 2012–13 season to the 2016–17 season, compiling an overall record of 116–22. She led the Redhawks to five Allegheny Mountain Collegiate Conference (AMCC) championships and five NCAA Tournament appearances. Gissendanner was also named the AMCC Coach of the Year in 2013 and the 2015–16 Advocates for Athletic Equity Division III Coach of the Year.

She was an assistant coach for the La Salle Explorers women's basketball team during the 2017–18 season.

In 2018–19, Gissendanner returned as the head coach at La Roche. She has since led the team to three more AMCC titles, in 2020, 2022, and 2023, and three more NCAA Tournament appearances, also in 2020, 2022, and 2023. She was also named the AMCC Coach of the Year in 2018, 2019, and 2023. Gissendanner continued serving as La Roche's head coach through the 2024–25 season.

Gissendanner was named the head women's basketball coach for the Saint Vincent Bearcats on August 13, 2025.
