= Wolfson Archives =

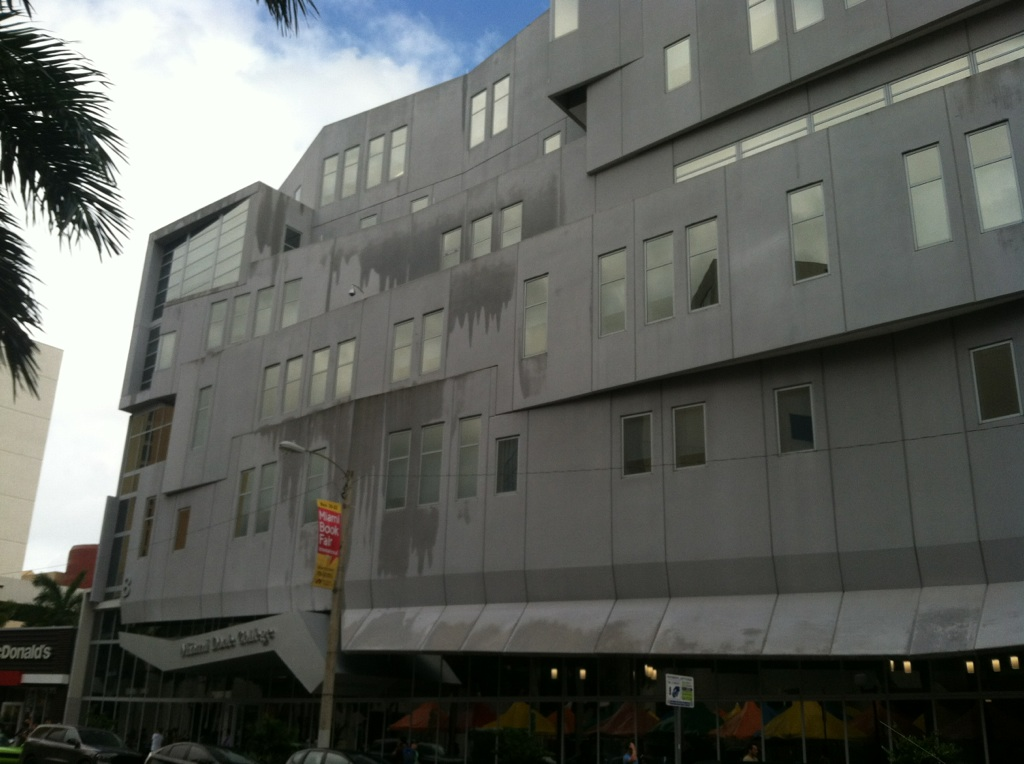
- Location: Miami-Dade College - Wolfson Campus, Miami, FL, United States

Other information
- Director: Rene Ramos
- Website: www.wolfsonarchives.org

The Lynn and Louis Wolfson II Florida Moving Image Archives (The Wolfson Archives) is currently housed at Miami Dade College's Wolfson Campus in downtown Miami, Florida, United States.

== History ==
Wolfson Archives was named in honor of benefactors Lynn and Louis Wolfson II and was founded in 1984 primarily by philanthropist Lynn Wolfson (née Rabin) (1927-2012), journalist Ralph Renick (1928-1991), and Miami historian Arva Moore Parks. It was created under the joint sponsorship of the Miami-Dade Public Library System, Miami Dade College, and the University of Miami. Originally, the Archives was housed in the basement area of the Main Branch of the Miami-Dade Public Library System, until it moved to its present location. The mission of the Archives is to: "collect, preserve and make accessible film and video materials made in or about Florida which reflect the history and culture of the region".

The Wolfson Archives has collected 35,000 hours of videotape and 23 million feet of film. It is recognized as an official repository of audiovisual material by the State of Florida, and one of the largest archives of its kind in the entire country.

== Collections ==
The Wolfson Archives is dedicated to film produced in or about Florida, and receives requests for footage from such notable people as the acclaimed filmmaker Ken Burns. The archive houses everything from news footage, home movies, and county-commissioned videos to promotional videos made for local tourist attractions, like Parrot Jungle (now called Jungle Island). Some of the footage dates as far back as 1910. The Archives also help restore film that holds historical importance and that runs the risk of deteriorating to original quality. Footage from the Archives was also used by CNN for the Anthony Bourdain: Parts Unknown series on Miami, Season 5, Episode 3.

The Wolfson Archives currently has the following collections available for browsing online:

- Broward County Historical Commission Collection
- Conni Gordon Collection
- Eastern Airlines Collection
- Home Movies Collection
- Miami Dade College Collection
- Miami Seaquarium Collection
- Montage Collection
- WINK-TV Collection

== Public programs ==
The Wolfson Archives is in the process of digitizing its vast collection in order to make it more readily available for the public. It offers a series of public programs such as the annual Home Movie Day, and weekly video "Rewind" showings of video clips. The Archives also participates in various South Florida special events such as the annual Miami Book Fair International. These are two of the programs geared to the community:

- Rewind: A series of free, informal, twice-weekly public screening of historical footage of archives' holdings.
- Learning from Miami: A collaborative website http://learningfrommiami.org/ between the Wolfson Archives, Miami Dade College's School of Architecture and Interior Design, and HistoryMiami.
