= Walter Wallace Sackett Jr. =

American politician and physician

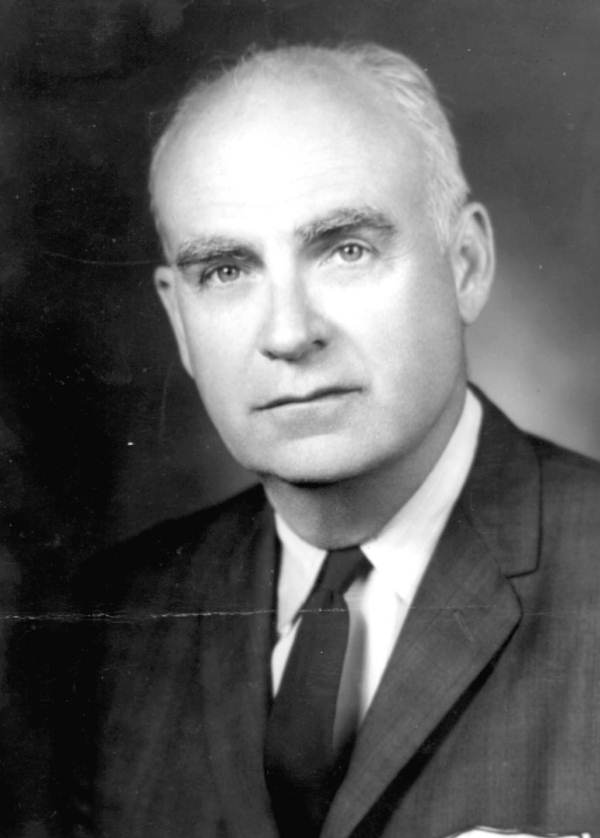
- Sackett in 1969

Member of the Florida House of Representatives from the 110th district
- In office November 7, 1972 – November 2, 1976
- Preceded by: Carey Matthews
- Succeeded by: Roberta Fox

Personal details
- Born: November 20, 1905 Bridgeport, Connecticut, U.S.
- Died: October 5, 1985 (aged 79)
- Party: Democratic; Republican
- Spouse: Sophia Sackett
- Education: University of Miami
- Occupation: Physician

Walter Wallace Sackett Jr. (November 20, 1905 – October 5, 1985) was an American politician and physician. He served as a Democratic member for the 110th district of the Florida House of Representatives.

Born in Bridgeport, Connecticut. Sackett attended the University of Miami, where he later graduated. He then attended the University of Chicago and Rush Medical College, where Sackett earned his medical degree. He moved to Coral Gables, Florida, in 1941, where he practiced medicine and was the president for the Dade County Medical Association.

Sackett wrote a book on baby care entitled "Bringing Up Babies: A Family Doctor's Practical Approach To Child Care", published in 1962. In it, he recommended "bacon and scrambled eggs breakfast" for 9-week-old infants, and later suggested serving coffee to 6-month-old babies.

In 1972, Sackett won the election for the 110th district of the Florida House of Representatives. He succeeded Carey Matthews. In 1976, Sackett was succeeded by Roberta Fox for the 110th district. He became a Republican member in the 1970s.

Sackett died in October 1985 in his sleep, at the age of 79. According to his wife, some of Sackett's legislative efforts centered on dignified death, and his proposals caused him to be compared at times to Adolf Hitler.
