= Elton Gissendanner =

American politician (1927–2023)

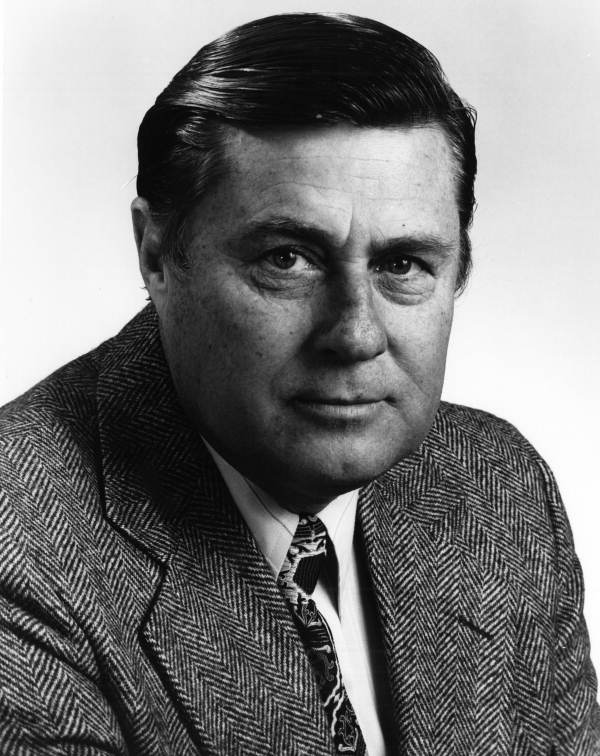

Member of the Florida House of Representatives from the 107th district
- In office 1967–1968

Personal details
- Born: November 8, 1927 Tallahassee, Florida, U.S.
- Died: September 1, 2023 (aged 95) Sebring, Florida, U.S.
- Party: Democratic
- Spouse: Sarah Frances Ruark
- Education: Auburn University, Abraham Baldwin Agricultural College, University of Georgia
- Occupation: Veterinarian

Elton Jake Gissendanner II (November 8, 1927 – September 1, 2023) was an American veterinarian and politician from Florida.

== Life and career ==
Elton Jake Gissendanner II was born in Tallahassee, Florida, on November 8, 1927. He married Sarah Frances Ruark, served in the United States Air Force and Georgia Air National Guard, then graduated from the University of Georgia College of Veterinary Medicine in 1955. He opened a veterinary practice in North Miami, would practice for 65 years, and established 20 low-cost spay and neuter clinics.

Gissendanner served as mayor of North Miami from 1963 to 1965, then as a member of the Florida House of Representatives from 1967 to 1968, representing the 107th district. As a state representative, he helped to establish the University of Florida College of Veterinary Medicine. From 1979 to 1987, he was executive director of the Florida Department of Natural Resources. He resigned after being indicted for bribery in a drug smuggling case. While he was not convicted on that charge, he later pled guilty to obstruction of justice.

Elton Gissendanner died in Sebring, Florida, on September 1, 2023, at the age of 95.
