= B. Campbell Thornal =

American judge

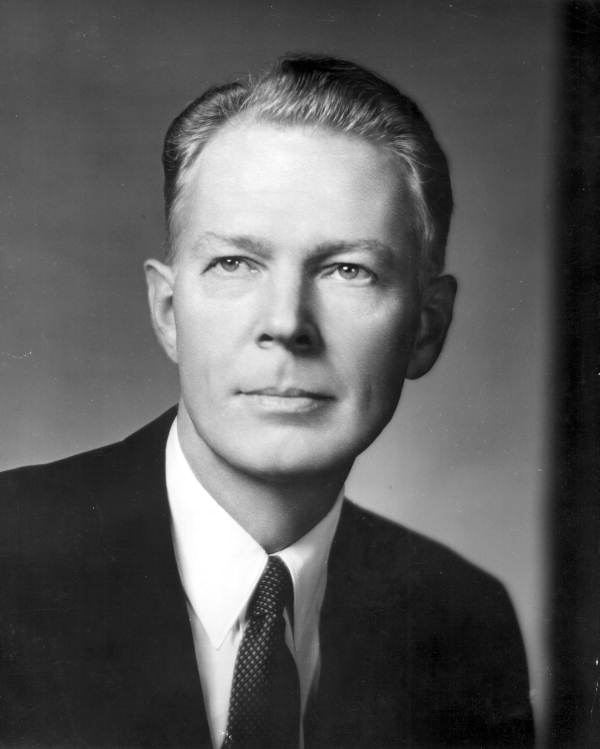

Justice for the Florida Supreme Court
- In office 1955–1970
- Preceded by: John Mathews
- Succeeded by: David McCain

Personal details
- Born: October 18, 1908 Charleston, South Carolina, U.S.
- Died: November 4, 1970 (aged 62) Durham, North Carolina, U.S.
- Spouse: Alyce Letton

Benjamin Campbell Thornal (October 15, 1908 – November 4, 1970) was a justice of the Florida Supreme Court.

Thornal was a justice of the Florida Supreme Court from 1955 to 1970, and served as the court's chief justice from 1965 to 1967. He died in 1970, while still a serving member of the court.

Born in Charleston, South Carolina, Thornal graduated from the University of Florida College of Law with a bachelor of laws degree in 1930, and became a partner in the Orlando law firm of Baker & Thornal. He was commissioned as a lieutenant in the U.S. Navy during World War II. He served three separate stints as the city attorney for the City of Orlando, and one term as the county attorney for Orange County. He was selected for the Florida Supreme Court in 1955.

He died in Durham, North Carolina, while being treated for cancer at the Duke University Medical Center. He was 62 years old.
