= Ernest Amos =

Ernest Amos may refer to:

- Ernest Amos (footballer)
- Ernest Amos (politician)
