= Senator Tracy (disambiguation) =

Uriah Tracy (1755–1807) was a U.S. Senator from Connecticut. Senator Tracy may also refer to:

- Albert H. Tracy (1793–1859), New York State Senate
- Erasmus Darwin Tracy (1810–1877), Florida State Senate
- Jil Tracy (born 1973), Illinois State Senate
- Jim Tracy (politician) (1956–2026), Tennessee State Senate
