= Senator Carlucci =

Senator Carlucci may refer to:

- David Carlucci (born 1981), New York State Senate
- Joe Carlucci (1929–1986), Florida State Senate
