= Senator Broxson =

Senator Broxson may refer to:

- Doug Broxson (born 1949), Florida State Senate
- John Broxson (1932–2019), Florida State Senate
