= Senator Turnbull =

Senator Turnbull may refer to:

- Reg Turnbull (1908–2006), Senate of Australia
- Robert Turnbull (American politician) (1850–1920), Virginia State Senate
- Theodore Turnbull (1881–1944), Florida State Senate
