= Senator Brantley =

Senator Brantley may refer to:

- Crystal Brantley (born 1979), New Mexico State Senate
- Haskew Brantley (1922–2001), Georgia State Senate
- Lew Brantley (1937–2004), Florida State Senate
- William G. Brantley (1860–1934), Georgia State Senate
