= SCSO =

SCSO may refer to:

- Santa Rosa County Sheriff's Office
- Sarasota County Sheriff's Office
- Seminole County Sheriff's Office
- Skagit County Sheriff's Office
- South Carolina Science Olympiad
- Story County Sheriff's Office (Iowa)
- Sumter County Sheriff's Office (Florida)
