= List of presidents of the Florida Senate =

President of the Florida Senate
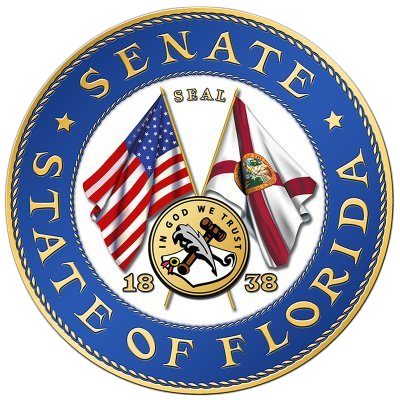
- Seal of the Florida Senate

- Incumbent; Jim Boyd since November 17, 2026
- Legislative branch of the Florida government
- Style: Senator (informal); The Honorable (formal)
- Type: Presiding officer
- Appointer: Florida Senate
- Term length: 2 years; renewable
- Constituting instrument: Constitution of Florida
- Inaugural holder: James A. Berthelot
- Formation: 1845 (180 years ago)
- Website: Official website

This is a list of presidents of the Florida Senate. In Florida, the president of the Senate is elected by the Senate membership to a two-year term. They appoint committees and their chairs and route bills to the committees. They also co-ordinate with the chair of the Committee on Rules and Calendar on the ordering of bills on the calendar. From 1865 to 1887, the lieutenant governor was the president of the Senate.

== List ==
- 1845 James A. Berthelot
- 1846 D. H. Mays
- 1847 Daniel G. McLean
- 1848 Erasmus Darwin Tracy
- 1850 Robert J. Floyd
- 1854 Hamlin Valentine Snell
- 1856 Philip Dell
- 1858 John Finlayson
- 1860 Thomas Jefferson Eppes
- 1861 Thomas Jefferson Eppes
- 1862 Enoch J. Vann
- 1863 Enoch J. Vann
- 1864 Abraham K. Allison
- Office held by Lieutenant Governor ex officio from 1865 until 1887
- 1889 Joseph B. Wall
- 1891 Jefferson B. Browne
- 1893 William H. Reynolds
- 1895 Frederick T. Myers
- 1897 Charles J. Perrenot
- 1899 Frank Adams
- 1901 Thomas Palmer
- 1903 Frank Adams
- 1905 Park M. Trammell
- 1907 W. Hunt Harris
- 1909 Frederick M. Hudson
- 1911 Frederick Preston Cone
- 1913 Herbert J. Drane
- 1915 Charles E. Davis
- 1917 J. B. Johnson
- 1919 James E. Calkins
- 1921 William A. MacWilliams
- 1923 Theodore Tiffany Turnbull
- 1925 John Stansel Taylor
- 1927 Samuel W. Anderson
- 1929 Jesse J. Parrish
- 1931 Patrick C. Whitaker
- 1933 Truman G. Futch
- 1935 William C. Hodges
- 1937 D. Stuart Gillis
- 1939 J. Turner Butler
- 1941 John R. Beacham
- 1943 Philip D. Beall Sr.
- 1945 Walter W. Rose
- 1947 Scott Dilworth Clarke
- 1949 Newman Collins Brackin
- 1951 Wallace E. Sturgis
- 1953 Charley Eugene Johns
- 1955 W. Turner Davis
- 1957 William A. Shands
- 1959 Dewey M. Johnson
- 1961 W. Randolph Hodges
- 1962–1963 Wilson Carraway
- 1965 James E. Connor
- 1966–1968 Verle Pope
- 1969–1970 John Mathews Jr.
- 1971–1972 Jerry Thomas
- 1973–1974 Mallory Horne
- 1975–1976 Dempsey Barron
- 1977–1978 Lew Brantley
- 1979–1980 Phil Lewis
- 1981–1982 W. D. Childers
- 1983–1984 Curtis Peterson
- 1985–1986 Harry Johnston
- 1987–1988 John Vogt
- 1989–1990 Bob Crawford
- 1991–1992 Gwen Margolis
- 1992–1993 Ander Crenshaw
- 1993–1994 Pat Thomas
- 1995–1996 James A. Scott
- 1997–1998 Toni Jennings
- 1999–2000 Toni Jennings
- November 2000–November 2002 John M. McKay
- November 2002–November 2004 Jim King, Republican
- November 16, 2004 – November 21, 2006 Tom Lee, Republican
- November 2006–November 2008 Ken Pruitt, Republican
- November 2008–November 2010 Jeff Atwater, Republican
- November 2010–November 2012 Mike Haridopolos, Republican
- November 20, 2012 – November 18, 2014 Don Gaetz, Republican
- November 18, 2014 – November 22, 2016 Andy Gardiner, Republican
- November 22, 2016 – November 20, 2018 Joe Negron, Republican
- November 20, 2018 – November 17, 2020 Bill Galvano, Republican
- November 17, 2020 – November 22, 2022 Wilton Simpson, Republican
- November 22, 2022 – November 19, 2024 Kathleen Passidomo, Republican
- November 19, 2024 – November 17, 2026 Ben Albritton, Republican
- November 17, 2026 – present Jim Boyd, Republican

== President Pro Tempore ==
President Pro Tempore of the Florida Senate, the office is a two-year leadership position. The Florida Senate says the President Pro Tempore is nominated by the Senate President and elected by the full Senate. They preside over the Florida Senate when the Senate President is absent and assists with duties defined by the Senate President and Senate rules. They also function somewhat like a vice president/deputy speaker.

=== List (since 2000) ===
- 2000: Ginny Brown-Waite
- 2002: Alex Diaz de la Portilla
- 2004: Charlie Clary
- 2006: Lisa Carlton
- 2008: Mike Fasano
- 2010: Mike Bennett
- 2012: Garrett Richter
- 2016: Anitere Flores
- 2018: David Simmons
- 2020: Aaron Bean
- 2022: Dennis Baxley
- 2024: Jason Brodeur
- 2026: Ana Maria Rodriguez

== See also ==
- Florida Democratic Party
- Republican Party of Florida
- List of Florida state legislatures
