= Newman Collins Brackin =

American politician (1908–1969)

Newman Collins Brackin Sr. (1908 – July 1969) was an American businessman and politician. He served in the Florida Senate for 16 years including as President of the Florida Senate in 1949. He owned a drugstore and was part owner of a car dealer, both in Crestview, Florida. He resided in Okaloosa County for 35 years. He served in the Florida House of Representatives in 1941 and 1943 before moving to the Florida Senate in 1945 and serving until 1959. A Democrat, he represented the First District in the state senate. He is not listed in office during 1953 and 1955.

He owned Brackin's Drug Store. He was a member of the First Methodist Church.

The Florida Archives have a photo of him receiving a parking ticket while holding his horse. The Florida Archives has a photo of him speaking at the Florida Watermelon Festival in Leesburg, Florida in 1949. In 1949 he spoke at the Jackson Day Dinner at the Pensacola Yacht Club. In May 1949 he was photographed alongside Florida governor Fuller Warren and some of his fellow state legislators accepting strawberries from growers. In 1959 he was photographed riding a horse in Crestview, Florida.

He died at Fort Walton Beach Hospital and was buried at Live Oak Park Cemetery. A concurrent resolution in memoriam was recorded in the Florida Senate.

Newman C. Brackin Wayside Park is on Okaloosa Island in Fort Walton Beach, Florida.
