= Fred Ball Park =

Park in Tampa

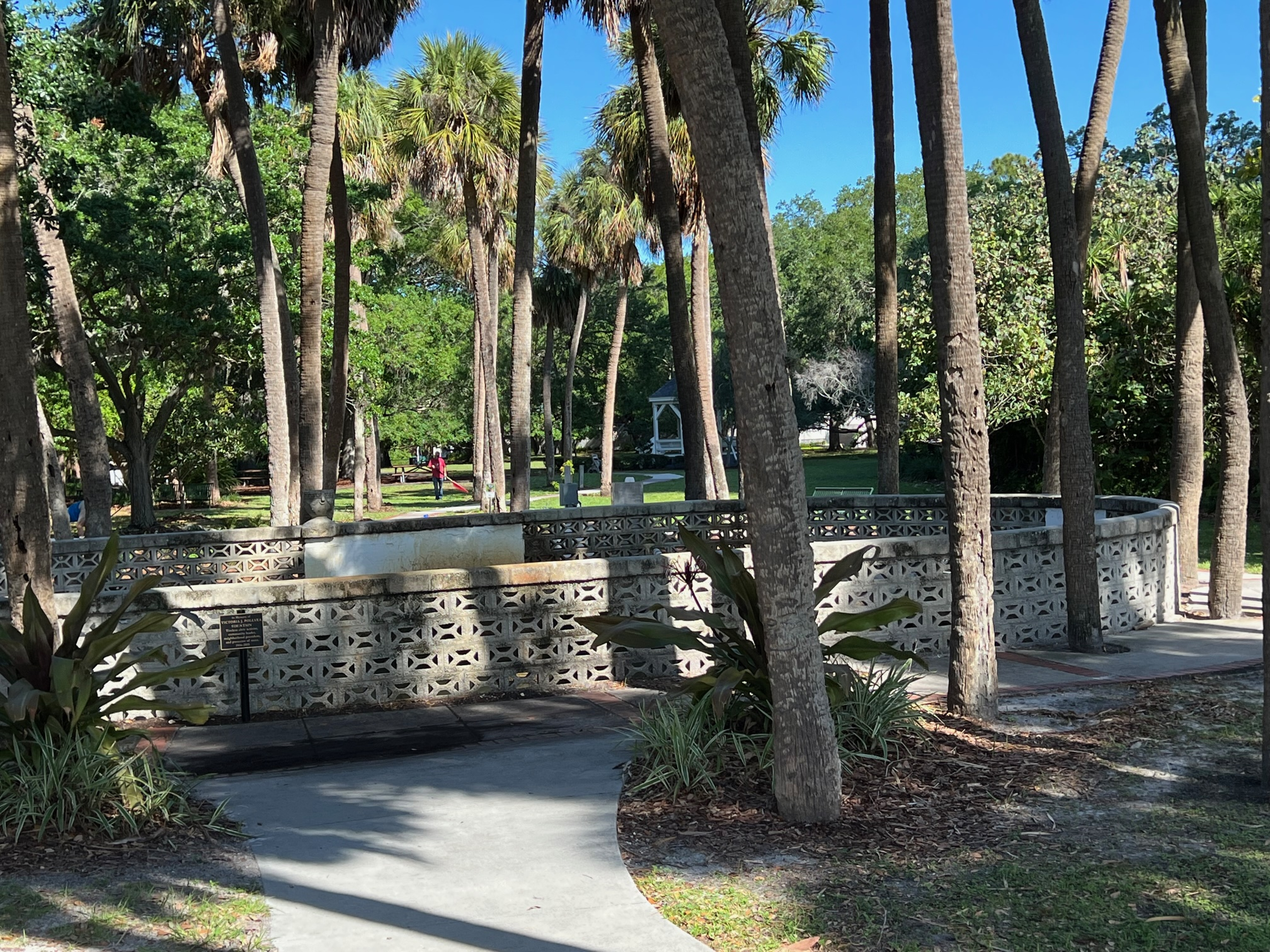
- Spring at Fred Ball Park Tampa

- Location within Florida
- Nearest city: Tampa, Florida
- Coordinates: 27°55.299′N 82°29.290′W
- Area: 2 acres (0.81 ha)
- Established: 1906

Fred Ball Park, also previously called Palma Ceia Spring Park, is a small park off Bayshore Blvd in Tampa, FL. The park has benches, a fountain, and a view of Tampa Bay. The Park is named after Fred Ball who served Tampa and Hillsborough County for 24 years in local government. Ball was also Executive Secretary of the West Coast Inland Waterway Commission.

In the mid-1800s, Palma Ceia Spring was known for its healing powers, and people came to bathe in its waters. A fountain was erected on the current grounds of the park in 1906 and is supplied by the Palma Ceia Spring. What remains of the spring can be found at Fred Ball Park.

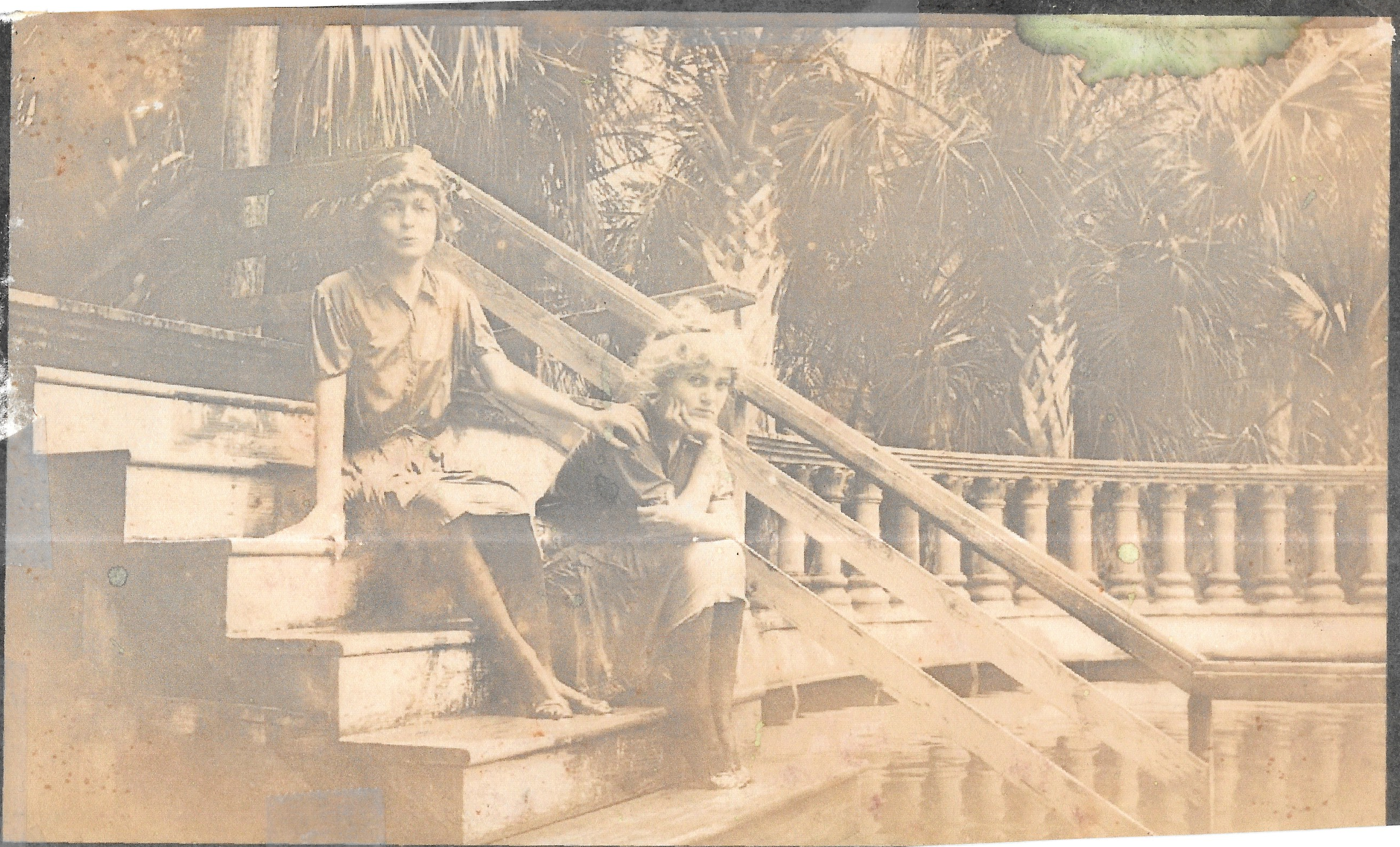
Palma Ceia springs with lady swimmers 1906

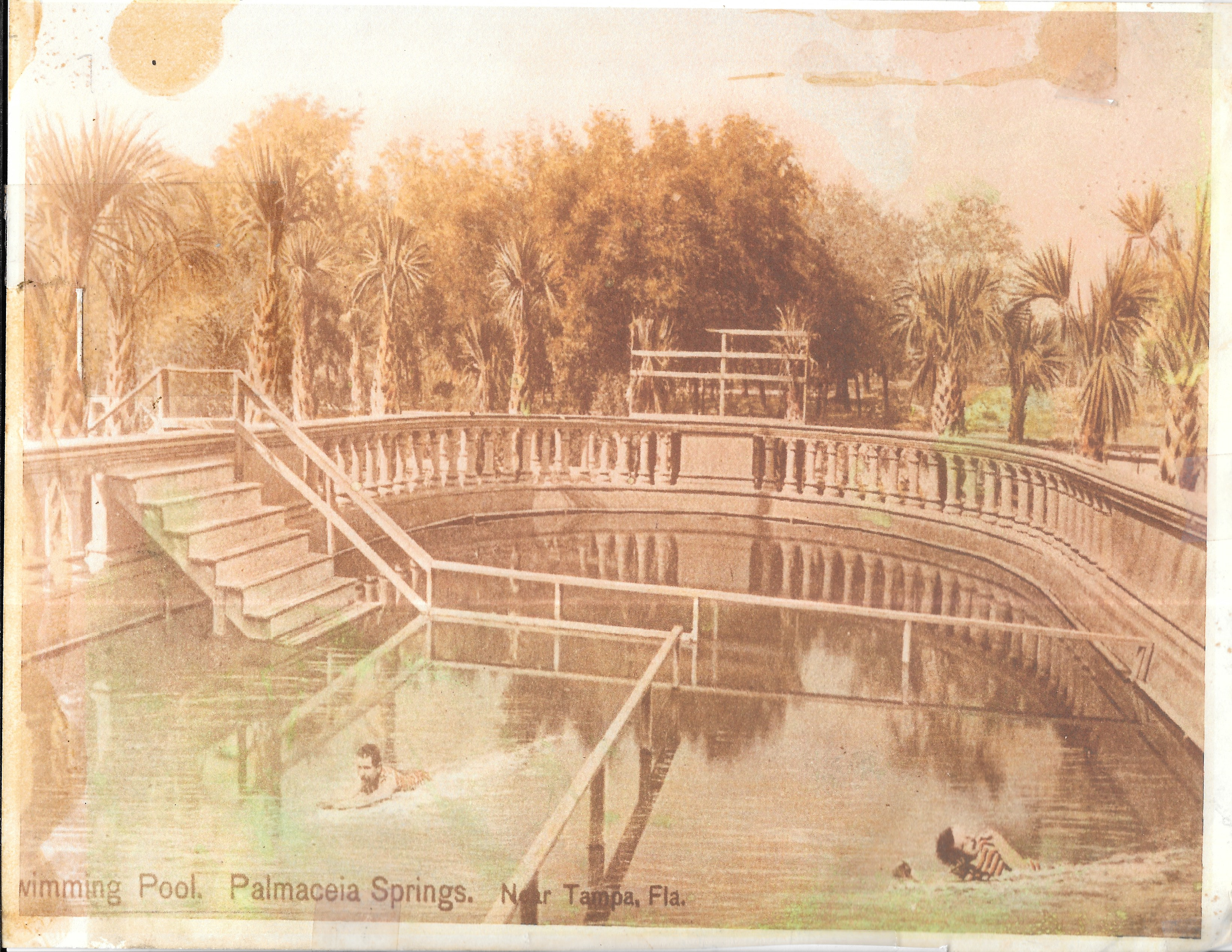
Palma Ceia springs original pool 1906

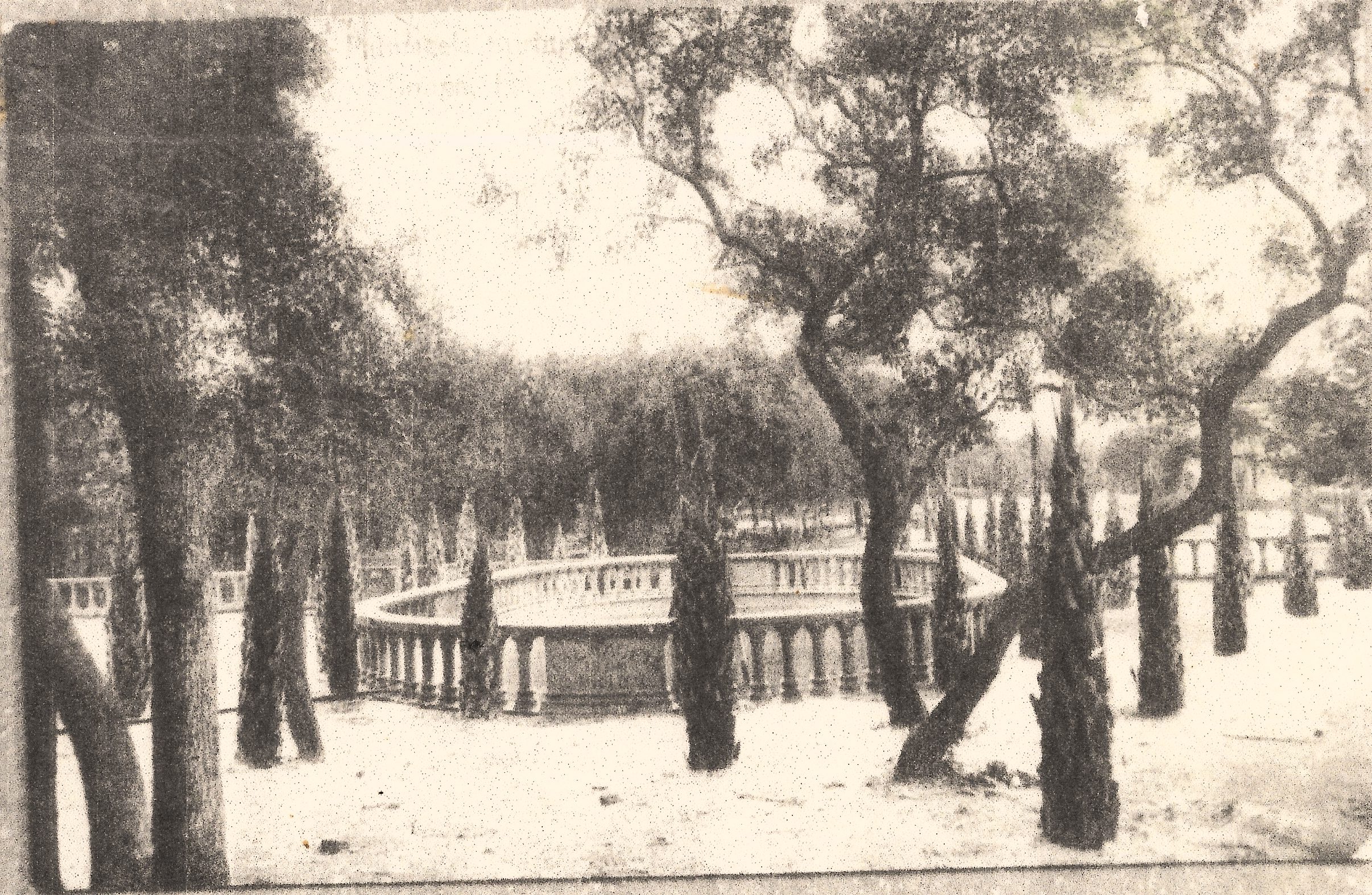
Palma Ceia springs original pool with trees 1906

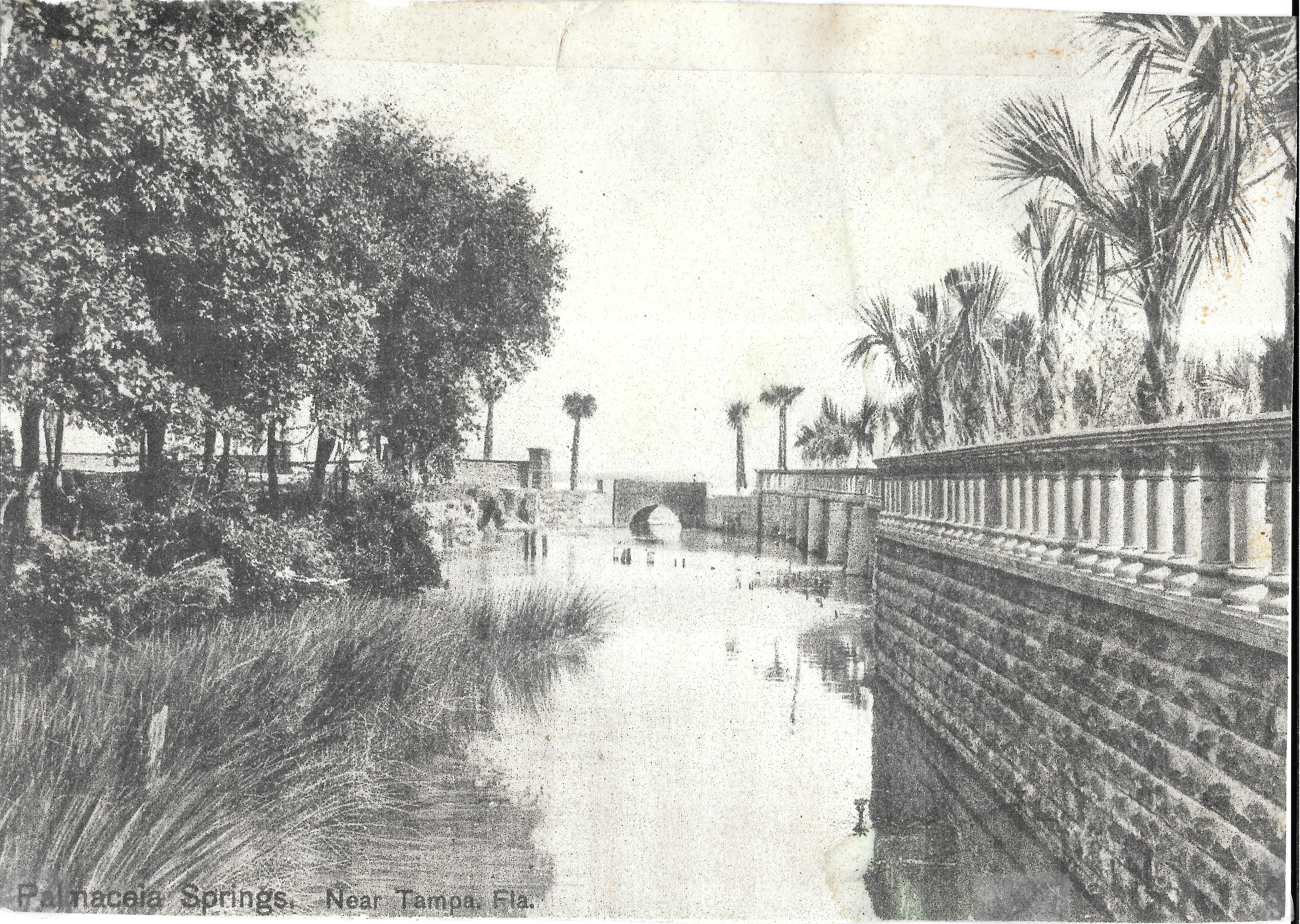
Palma Ceia springs flowing to bay 1906

In 1926 Thomas Palmer was recorded as owning Palma Ceia Springs. The City constructed a large pool in 1928. A streetcar stop was part of the Port Tampa to Ballast Point line.

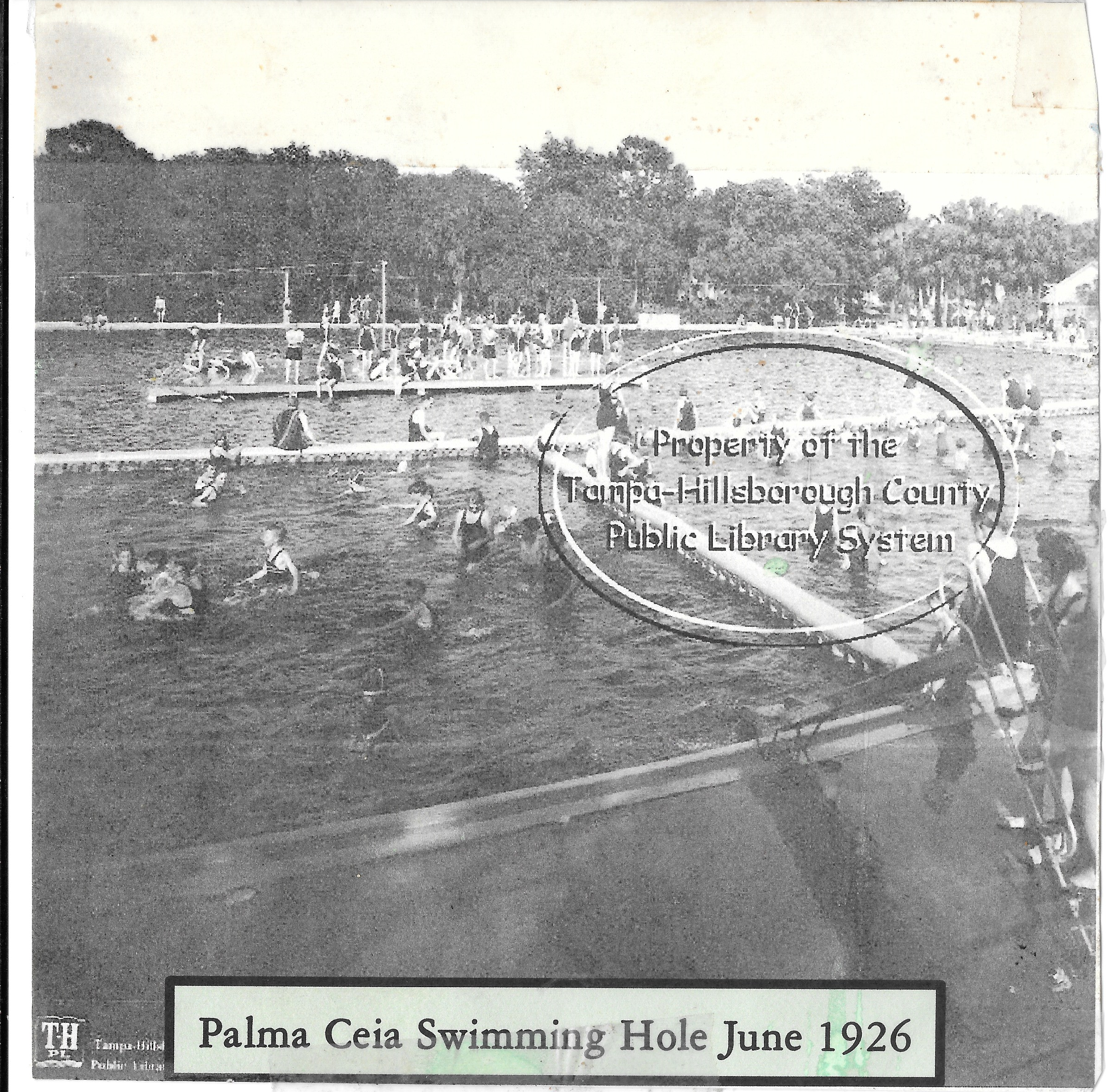
Palma Ceia springs swimming hole 1926

In 1947, Ball persuaded Hillsborough County to purchase the spring for $15,000 from the estate of Thomas Palmer. The County converted the area to a public park and enlarged the pool.

After World War II, the pool fell into disuse due to pollution. The City filled the pool in 1959, pushing out a five-foot alligator.

The park was renovated in 1988 by the Rose Circle Garden Club. The renovation cost $31,000 and renovated one of three springs on the site.

In 2006, a proposal to install a 42 by 52 foot angel memorial on a 82 by 82 foot brick area in the small park was rejected by the City Parks Department.

A small memorial to local Victoria Jane Pollyea is located at the spring in the park.

== Gallery ==
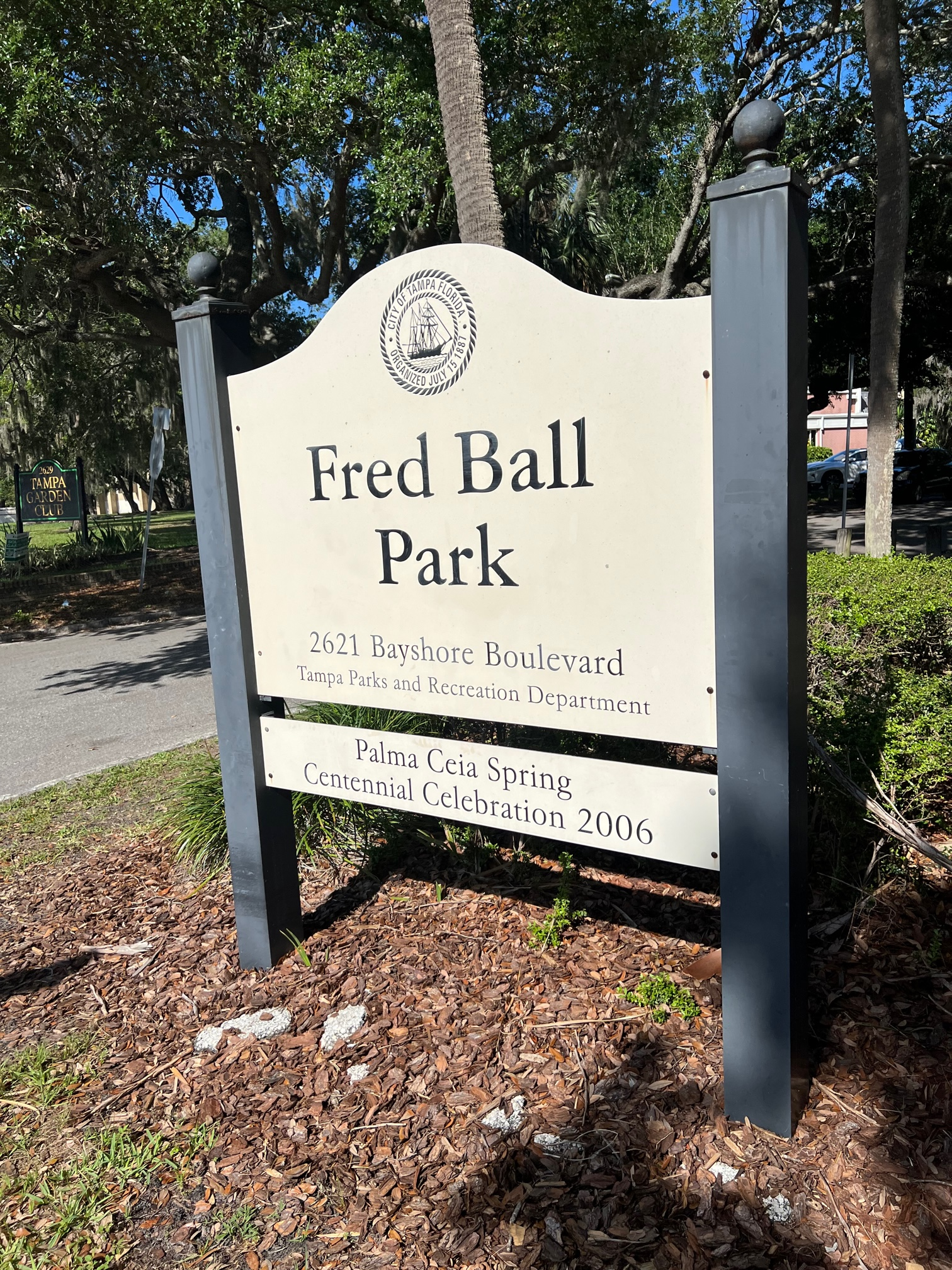

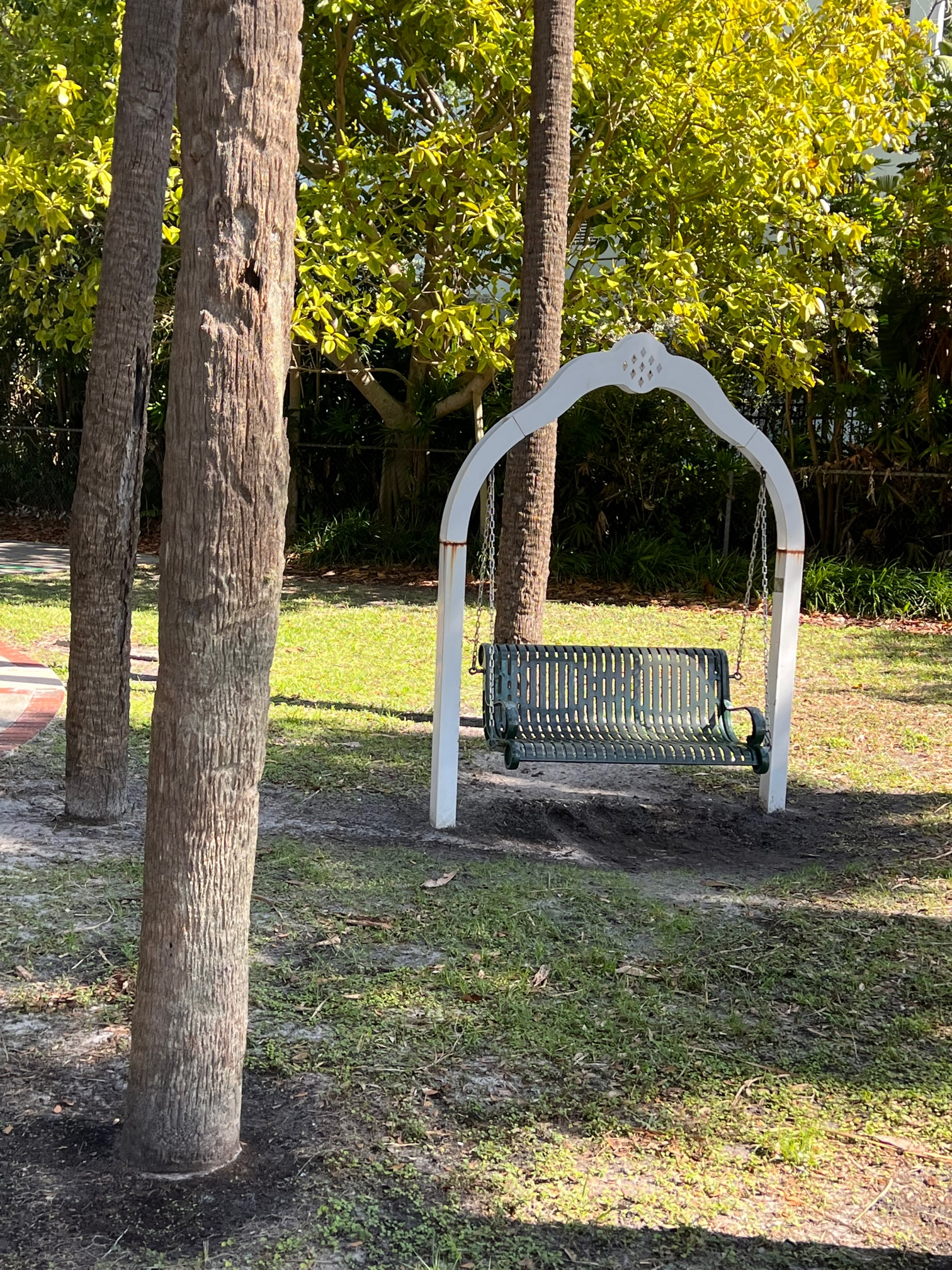

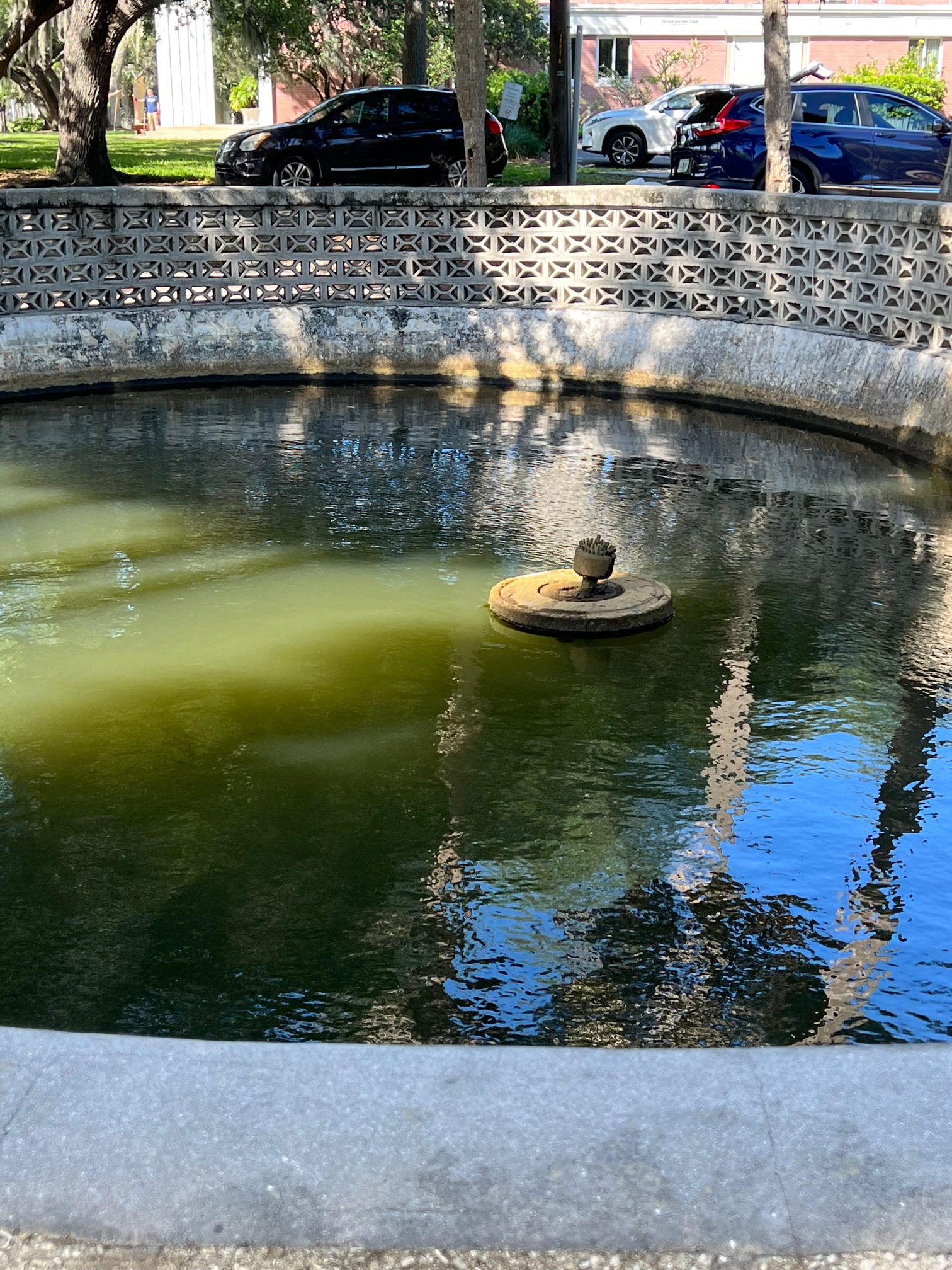

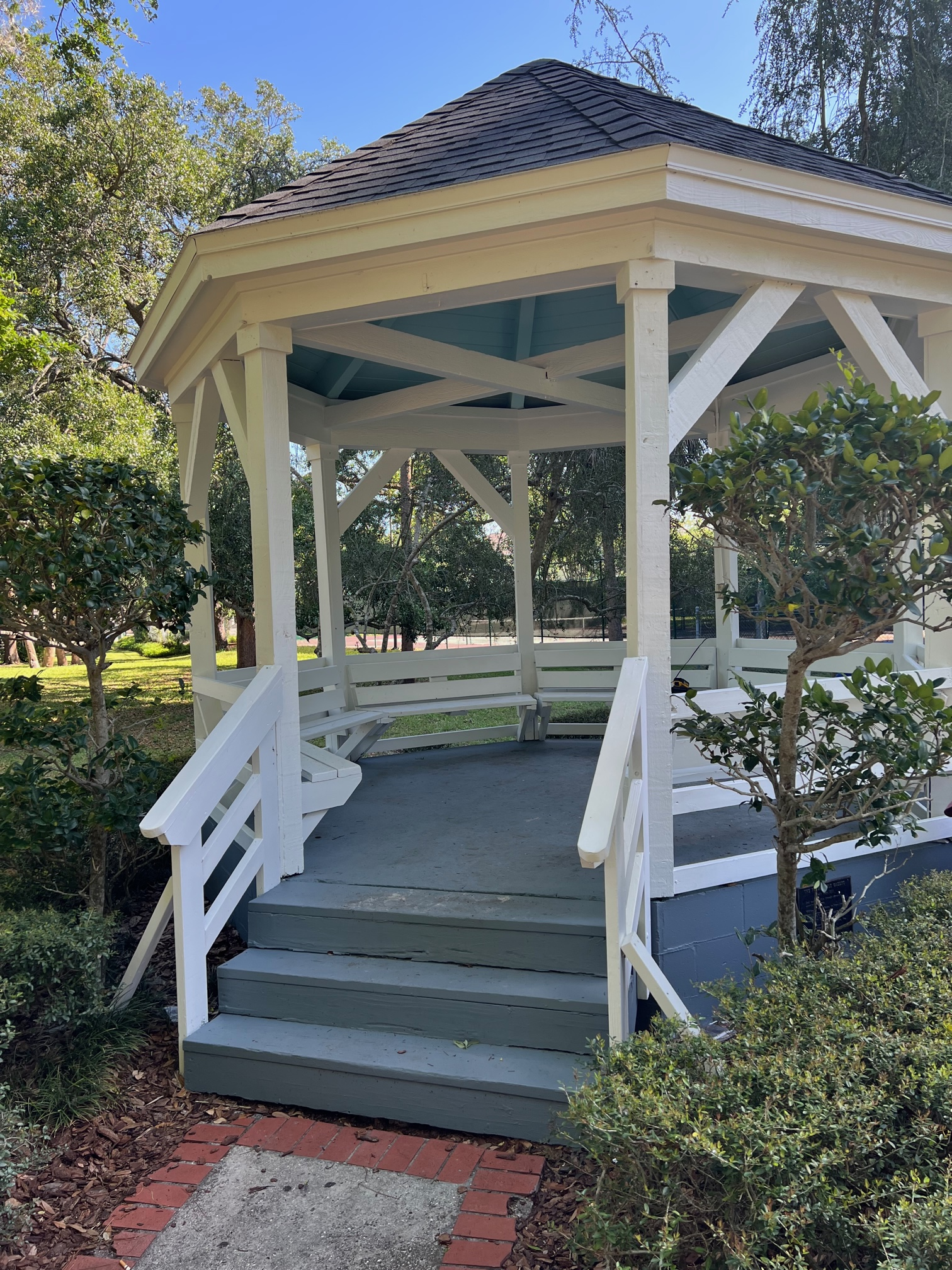
