= Museum of Florida History =

Museum in Florida, USA

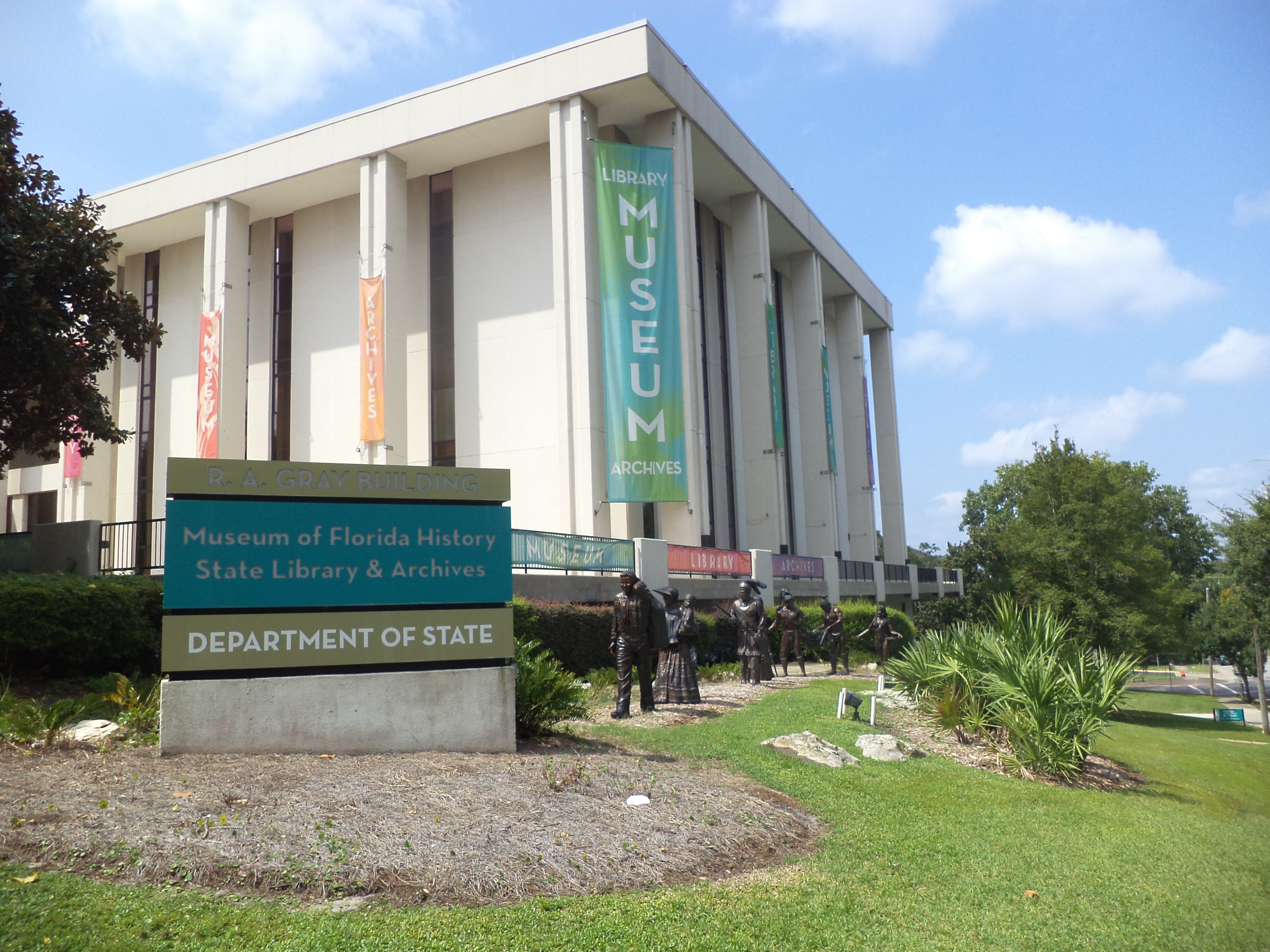

- Location within Florida
- Established: 1977
- Location: R.A. Gray Building; 500 South Bronough Street; Tallahassee, Florida
- Coordinates: 30.437976°N 84.284961°W
- Type: History
- Website: www.museumoffloridahistory.com

The Museum of Florida History is the U.S. state of Florida's history museum, housing exhibits and artifacts covering its history and prehistory. It is located in the state capital, Tallahassee, Florida, at the R. A. Gray Building, 500 South Bronough Street, named for Robert Andrew Gray.

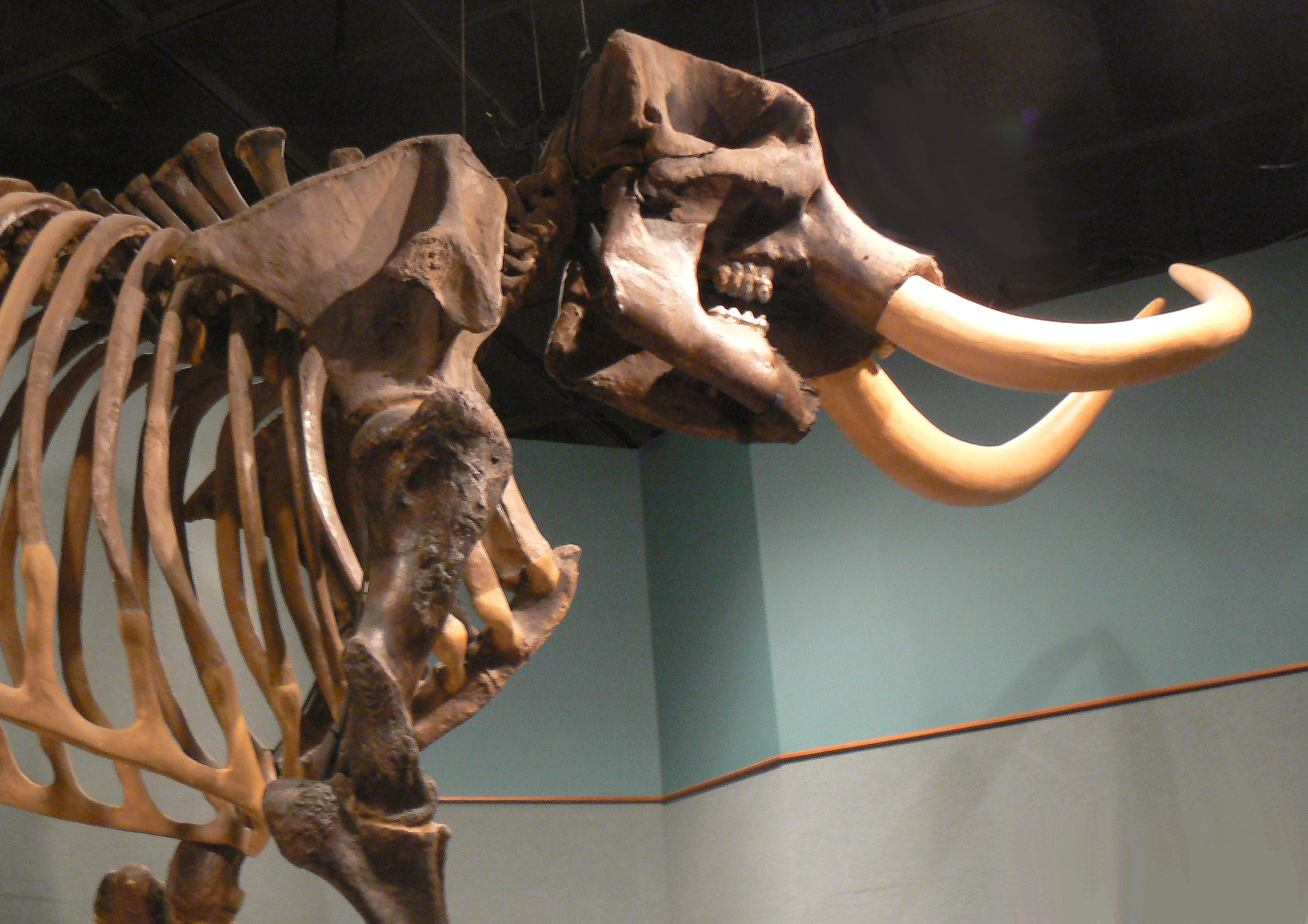
A mastodon skeleton on display at the Museum of Florida History

The museum features a gallery with exhibits that change every few months as well as permanent exhibits. Previous exhibits include Beyond the Vote: Florida Women’s Activism, Florida Inspired: Landscapes from the Risner Fine Art Collection, and Living the Dream: Twentieth Century Florida.

Opened in 1977, the Museum of Florida History collects, preserves, exhibits, and interprets evidence of past and present cultures in Florida, and promotes knowledge and appreciation of this heritage.

As the state history museum, it focuses on artifacts and eras unique to Florida's development and on roles that Floridians have played in national and global events.

Through exhibits, educational programs, research, and collections, the Museum reflects the ways that people have shaped and reacted to their cultural and natural environments.

The Museum of Florida History is administered by the Florida Division of Cultural Affairs, a division of the Florida Department of State.

== Knott House ==
The Museum of Florida History operates the Knott House, built in 1843. The Knott House was the temporary headquarters of the Union Army in Tallahassee. The Emancipation Proclamation was read from the steps of the building on May 20, 1865, declaring freedom for all slaves in the Florida panhandle. After the Civil War, Florida's first black physician got his start working for a doctor on the premises.

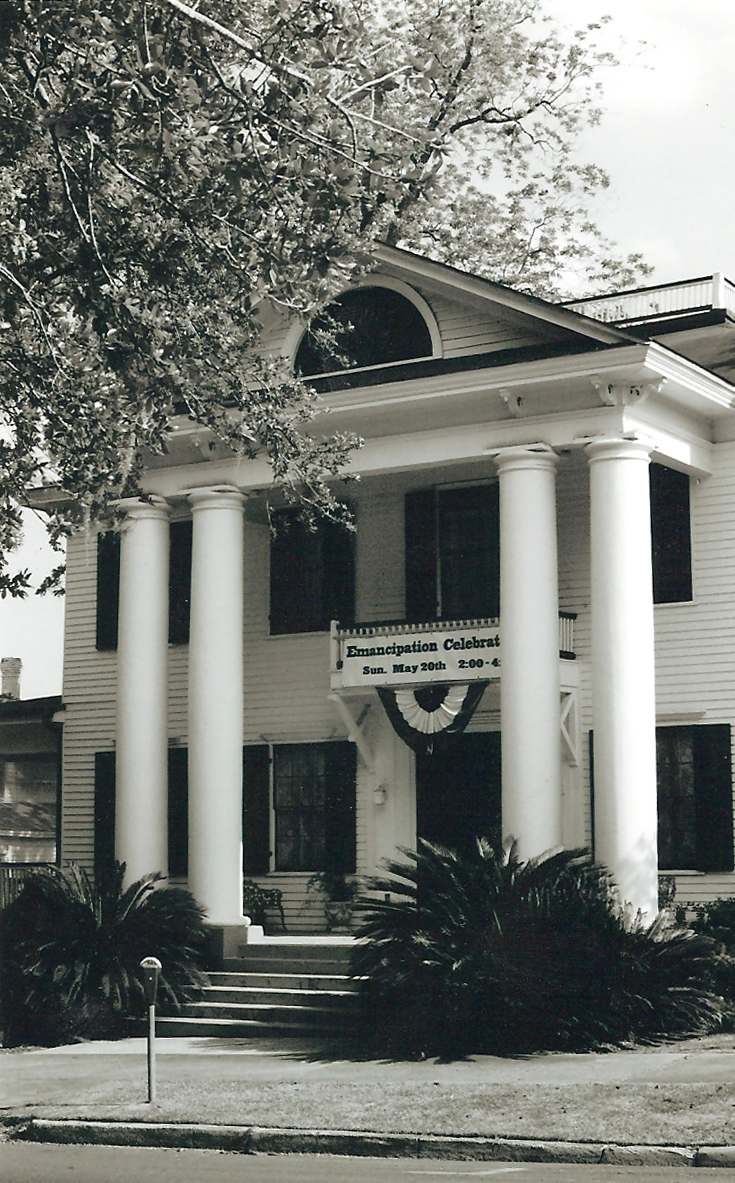
Knott House

== See also ==
- Florida Historical Society
- State Library and Archives of Florida
