= Phil Lewis (Florida politician) =

American politician (1929–2012)

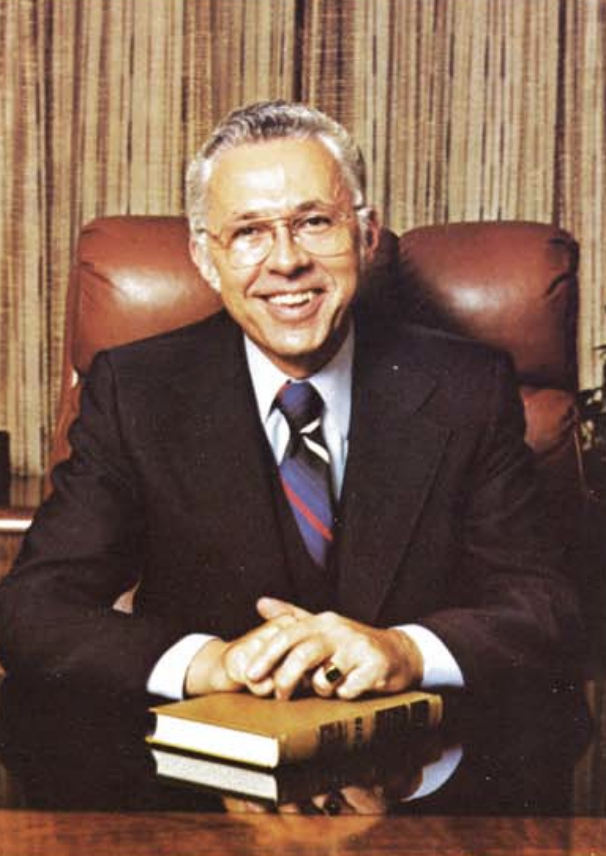

President of the Florida Senate
- In office November 21, 1978 – November 4, 1980
- Preceded by: Lew Brantley
- Succeeded by: W. D. Childers

Member of the Florida Senate
- In office November 3, 1970 – November 4, 1980
- Preceded by: Skip Bafalis
- Succeeded by: Tom Lewis
- Constituency: 33rd district (1970–1972); 27th district (1972–1980)

Personal details
- Born: September 27, 1929 Omaha, Nebraska
- Died: September 4, 2012 (aged 82) West Palm Beach, Florida
- Party: Democratic
- Spouse: Maryellen Howley
- Children: 9
- Education: Georgetown University
- Occupation: Real estate broker

Philip D. Lewis (September 27, 1929 – September 4, 2012) was a Democratic politician from Florida who served as a member of the Florida Senate from 1970 to 1980, including as President of the Florida Senate from 1978 to 1980.

== Early life ==
Lewis was born in Omaha, Nebraska, in 1929, and he moved to Palm Beach County, Florida in 1931. He attended Georgetown University. After graduating, Lewis worked for his father's real estate development firm, and in 1958, he established Philip D. Lewis Real Estate in Riviera Beach.

== Florida Senate ==
In 1970, when State Senator Skip Bafalis opted to run for Governor, Lewis ran to succeed him in the 33rd district. He narrowly defeated the Republican nominee, State Representative Bill James, winning 50.3 percent of the vote to James's 49.7 percent.

Following redistricting, Lewis ran for re-election in the 27th district. He was challenged by J. Patrick Bascom, the former mayor of St. Lucie Village, and defeated him with 58 percent of the vote. He was re-elected without opposition in 1976.

Lewis was elected President of the Florida Senate for the 1978 to 1980 term. He declined to run for re-election in 1980.

== Legacy and death ==
In honor of Lewis's advocacy for ending homelessness, Palm Beach County opened the Senator Philip D. Lewis Homeless Resource Center in West Palm Beach.

Lewis died on September 4, 2012.
