= James A. Berthelot =

American politician

James A. Berthelot was an American politician. He was a member of the territorial senate in Florida. He was elected president of the senate unanimously.

The Florida Archives have a campaign poster for him and two candidates for the Florida House of Representatives. He and the speaker of the Florida House signed onto a request submitted to the U.S. Congress for recompense to Floridians for property losses in the Seminole Wars.

== See also ==
- List of presidents of the Florida Senate
