= T. J. Eppes =

American politician

Thomas Jefferson Eppes was a cotton planter and politician who served as President of the Florida Senate in 1860 and 1861.

He was the son of Francis Eppes and the great-grandson of Thomas Jefferson.

In 1859, he wrote to governor Madison S. Perry from Appalachicola recommending Reuben L. Harrison for the position of cotton weigher.

He had a son, T. J. Eppes, who murdered a man and was put on trial in 1884. The younger Eppes married Kate E. Eppes who died July 25, 1886, at 22 years of age.
