= Harry Johnston (American politician) =

American politician (1931–2021)

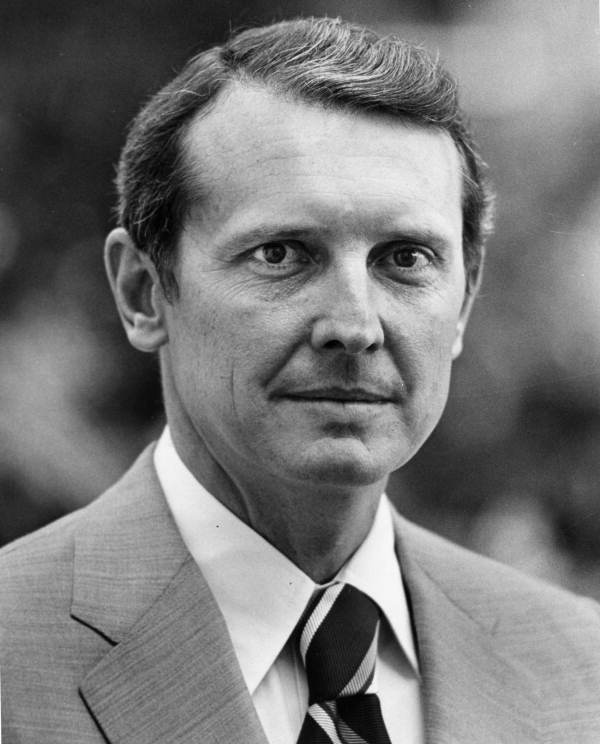
- Johnston in 1974

United States Special Envoy for Sudan
- In office August 27, 1999 – 2000
- President: Bill Clinton

Member of the U.S. House of Representatives from Florida
- In office January 3, 1989 – January 3, 1997
- Preceded by: Dan Mica
- Succeeded by: Robert Wexler
- Constituency: 14th District (1989–1993); 19th District (1993–1997)

President of the Florida Senate
- In office November 20, 1984 – November 18, 1986
- Preceded by: Curtis Peterson
- Succeeded by: John Vogt

Member of the Florida Senate from the 26th district
- In office November 5, 1974 – November 4, 1986
- Preceded by: Russell Sykes
- Succeeded by: Eleanor Weinstock

Personal details
- Born: Harry Allison Johnston II; December 2, 1931 West Palm Beach, Florida, U.S.
- Died: June 28, 2021 (aged 89) West Palm Beach, Florida, U.S.
- Party: Democratic
- Spouse: Mary Otley
- Children: 2
- Education: Virginia Military Institute (BA); University of Florida (JD)

Military service
- Allegiance: United States
- Branch/service: United States Army
- Years of service: 1953–1955
- Rank: First Lieutenant

Harry Allison Johnston II (December 2, 1931 – June 28, 2021) was an American lawyer, politician and diplomat from Florida. He was a four-term member of the United States House of Representatives from 1989 to 1997 and was a member of the Democratic Party.

== Early life and career ==
Johnston was born in West Palm Beach, Florida. He attended the Virginia Military Institute, and he became a lieutenant in the United States Army after graduating. Once he was discharged, he entered the University of Florida and earned his Juris Doctor degree.

=== Florida legislature ===
In 1974, Johnston was elected to the Florida Senate. With the Democrats in control of the body in the 1980s, Johnston rose to the rank of President of the Senate.

In 1986, he sought the Democratic nomination for Governor of Florida, but lost in a close primary race.

== Congress ==
Johnston was elected to Congress in 1988. He served four terms in the House before his retirement in 1997.

== Later career ==
In 1999, President Bill Clinton appointed him to serve as the United States Special Envoy for Sudan, a position he held until 2000.

He was an attorney at the West Palm Beach law firm of Jones, Foster, Johnston & Stubbs, P.A., until his retirement from practicing law.

He served on the District Board of Trustees at Palm Beach State College from 1997 to 1999.

== Death ==
Johnston died on June 28, 2021, aged 89, more than a decade after being diagnosed with Alzheimer's disease.

U.S. House of Representatives
Preceded by Daniel Mica	Member of the U.S. House of Representatives from Florida's 14th congressional district 1989–1993	Succeeded by Porter Goss
Preceded by Dante Fascell	Member of the U.S. House of Representatives from Florida's 19th congressional district 1993–1997	Succeeded by Robert Wexler
