= Curtis Peterson =

American politician

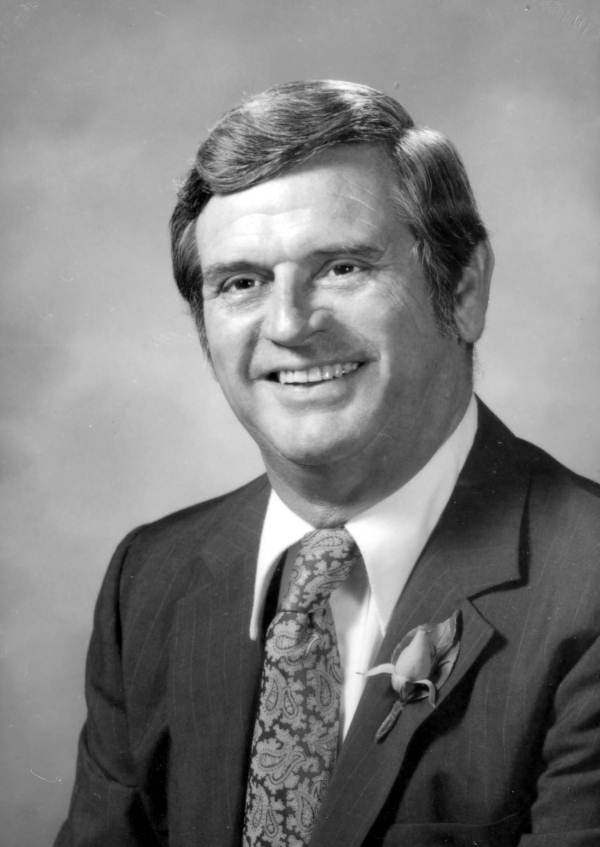

President of the Florida Senate
- In office November 16, 1982 – November 20, 1984
- Preceded by: W. D. Childers
- Succeeded by: Harry Johnston

Member of the Florida Senate from the 12th district
- In office November 21, 1972 – November 20, 1990
- Preceded by: Verle Pope
- Succeeded by: Quillian Yancey

Personal details
- Born: Newton Curtis Peterson Jr. August 23, 1922 Lakeland, Florida, U.S.
- Died: July 19, 1996 (aged 73) Lakeland, Florida, U.S.
- Party: Democrat
- Spouse: Ethel Schultz
- Children: Curtis III, Peter
- Profession: Nurseryman, landscape architect

Newton Curtis Peterson Jr. (August 23, 1922 – July 19, 1996) was a Florida state senator, nurseryman, and registered landscape architect.

== Early life and education ==
Peterson was born in Lakeland, Florida. He graduated from Lakeland High School in 1940 and then attended George Washington University and Florida Southern College. He also served in the United States Coast Guard on convoy duty during World War II.

== Career ==
Peterson was elected to the Florida Senate in 1972 and was president from 1982 until 1984.

== Death ==
He died July 19, 1996, during an operation on his heart at Lakeland Regional Health Medical Center.
