= Ander Crenshaw =

American politician (born 1944)

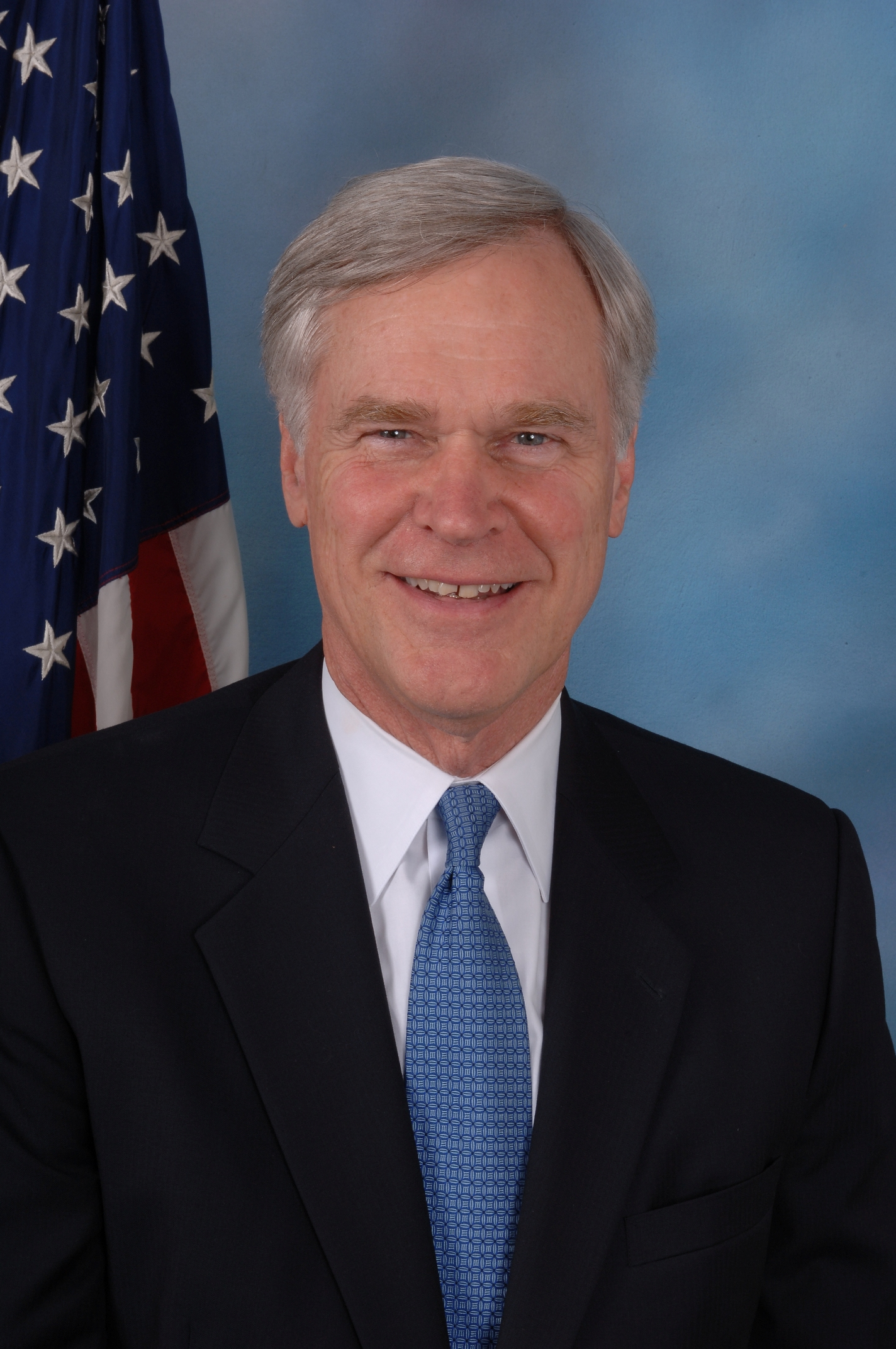

Member of the U.S. House of Representatives from Florida's 4th district
- In office January 3, 2001 – January 3, 2017
- Preceded by: Tillie Fowler
- Succeeded by: John Rutherford

President of the Florida Senate
- In office November 19, 1992 – October 11, 1993
- Preceded by: Gwen Margolis
- Succeeded by: Pat Thomas

Member of the Florida Senate
- In office November 4, 1986 – November 8, 1994
- Preceded by: Joe Carlucci
- Succeeded by: Jim Horne
- Constituency: 8th district (1986–1992); 6th district (1992–1994)

Member of the Florida House of Representatives from the 24th district
- In office November 7, 1972 – November 7, 1978
- Preceded by: Joseph Kennelly
- Succeeded by: Bill Bankhead

Personal details
- Born: Alexander Mann Crenshaw; September 1, 1944 (age 82) Jacksonville, Florida, U.S.
- Party: Republican
- Spouse: Kitty Kirk
- Children: 2
- Relatives: Claude Kirk (father-in-law)
- Education: University of Georgia (BA); University of Florida (JD)

Alexander Mann "Ander" Crenshaw (born September 1, 1944) is an American banker, attorney, and politician who served as the U.S. representative for Florida's 4th congressional district from 2001 to 2017. He is a member of the Republican Party. Crenshaw retired from Congress when his term ended on January 3, 2017.

== Early life, education and career ==
Crenshaw was born in Jacksonville, and earned his (B.A.) at the University of Georgia in 1966 and later received his J.D. degree from the University of Florida. He was an investment banker before being elected to Congress. Crenshaw served in the Florida State House of Representatives from 1972 to 1978 and in the Florida State Senate from 1986 to 1994. He was the first Republican Senate president in 118 years. Crenshaw was first elected to the United States House of Representatives in 2000.

== Early political career ==
=== Statewide runs ===
==== 1978 ====
In 1978, Crenshaw won the Republican primary for Florida Secretary of State. He lost the general election to Democrat George Firestone.

==== 1980 ====
In 1980, Crenshaw ran in the Republican primary for Florida’s U.S. Senate election, finishing third in a multi-candidate field. Crenshaw garnered 12.56% of the vote in the race, which was won by Paula Hawkins, who would go on to win the general election as well.

==== 1994 ====
In 1994, he ran for Florida Governor, but lost the primary to Jeb Bush, who won with a plurality of 46%. Crenshaw got just 12% of the vote in fourth place. State Secretary of State Jim Smith and State Treasurer Tom Gallagher got 18% and 13% of the vote respectively.

=== State Legislature ===
==== House ====
Crenshaw served in the Florida House of Representatives from 1972 through 1978.

==== Senate ====
He returned to public office in 1986, winning a special election for a seat in the Florida Senate that he held through 1994. He became the first Republican elected president of the Senate in 118 years in November 1992, but agreed to serve only one year instead of the usual two, as a compromise between Republicans and Democrats who were evenly split in the Senate that year.

== U.S. House of Representatives ==
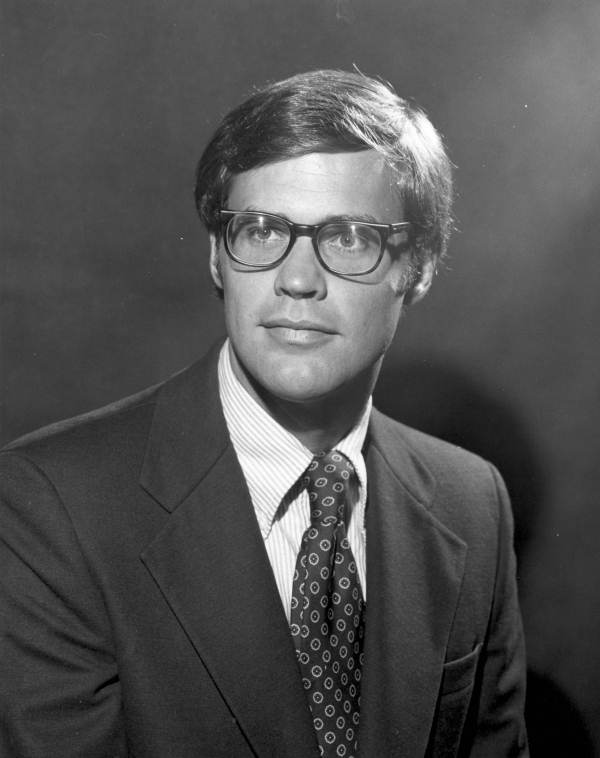
Crenshaw when he was in the Florida House of Representatives

=== Committee assignments ===
- Committee on Appropriations
  - Subcommittee on Defense
  - Subcommittee on Financial Services and General Government (Chair)
  - Subcommittee on State, Foreign Operations, and Related Programs
  - Subcommittee on the Legislative Branch (Chair during 112th Congress)

=== Caucus memberships ===
- Crohn's and Colitis Caucus (Co-chair)
- Effective Foreign Assistance (Co-chair)
- International Conservation Caucus (Co-chair)
- Nepal Caucus (Co-chair)
- Sportsmen's Caucus
- Tea Party Caucus
- Congressional Cement Caucus

=== Tenure ===
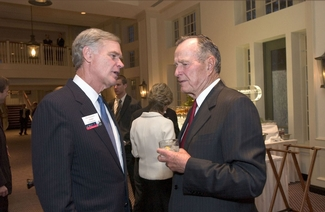
Crenshaw with former President George H. W. Bush in 2006.

Crenshaw largely kept a low profile during his congressional tenure. By the end of his tenure, he was a Deputy Majority Whip in the Republican leadership.

On September 29, 2008, Crenshaw voted for the Emergency Economic Stabilization Act of 2008 which created the Troubled Assets Relief Program. He was one of only three Florida Republicans to do so.

Despite his support of the bill, he issued a press release to "applaud the organizers and participants" of the April 15, 2009, First Coast Tax Day Tea Party in Jacksonville, one of the many 2009 Tea Party protests which condemned any bailouts.

On July 2, 2014, Crenshaw introduced the Financial Services and General Government Appropriations Act, 2015 (H.R. 5016; 113th Congress), an appropriations bill for fiscal year 2015 that would provide funding for the United States Department of the Treasury, as we all as the United States federal courts, the Executive Office of the President of the United States, and Washington, D.C.

On April 13, 2016, Crenshaw announce that he would be retiring and would not seek re-election, thereby concluding his congressional tenure after 16 years.

== Political campaigns ==
In 1980, Crenshaw finished third in the Republican primary for a U.S. Senate seat, earning roughly 13% of the vote behind Paula Hawkins and Louis Frey, Jr.

In 1994, he unsuccessfully sought the Republican nomination for governor, winning several counties but ultimately losing out to Jeb Bush. Crenshaw finished fourth (12.1%) behind Tom Gallagher and Jim Smith.

In 2000, Crenshaw returned to politics when he won the Republican nomination for the 4th District after Tillie Fowler retired to honor a self-imposed four-term limit. This district included just over half of Jacksonville, as well as most of its suburbs. He easily won in November, becoming only the fourth person to represent this district since its creation in 1943 (it was the 2nd District from 1943 to 1967, the 3rd District from 1967 to 1993, and has been the 4th since 1993). He was reelected five times with no substantive opposition in what has become one of the most Republican districts in Florida. He even ran unopposed in 2002 and 2004, and faced no major-party opposition in 2010 or 2012.

=== 2010 ===
Crenshaw was challenged by Independent Troy Stanley. Gary L. Koniz and Deborah "Deb" Katz Pueschel also qualified as write-ins.

== Personal life ==
Crenshaw is a son-in-law of former Governor of Florida Claude Roy Kirk, Jr. and has two grown daughters with his wife Kitty, whom he has been married to for over 44 years. He is an Episcopalian.

== Awards and honors ==
In 2013, Ander Crenshaw was awarded the Malaria Action Award for his work against malaria by Malaria No More.

Party political offices
Preceded by Jim Sebesta	Republican nominee for Secretary of State of Florida; 1978	Succeeded by Jim Smith
Political offices
Preceded by Gwen Margolis	President of the Florida Senate; 1992–1993	Succeeded by Pat Thomas
U.S. House of Representatives
Preceded by Tillie Fowler	Member of the U.S. House of Representatives from Florida's 4th congressional district 2001–2017	Succeeded by John Rutherford
U.S. order of precedence (ceremonial)
Preceded by Blaine Luetkemeyer as Former U.S. Representative	Order of precedence of the United States as Former U.S. Representative	Succeeded by Jeff Miller as Former U.S. Representative
