= William A. MacWilliams =

United States lawyer (1863–1941)

William Arthur MacWilliams (January 9, 1863 – January 9, 1941) was a city official, and state legislator in Florida who served in the Florida House of Representatives and Florida Senate, including as President of the Florida Senate.

== Early life ==
He was born in Camden, New Jersey, and grew up in Baltimore, Maryland. He moved to Florida in 1885.

== Career ==
=== Florida National Guard ===
MacWilliams served in the Florida National Guard. He led military rule of Jacksonville, Florida after the 1901 fire. A colonel, he received the grade of Brigadier General in 1913.

=== Politics ===
He served in the Florida House of Representatives from St. Johns County in 1899, 1907, 1909, 1911 and 1913. He served in the Florida Senate representing the 31st District in 1901, 1903, 1917, 1919, 1921 (as its president), 1923, 1933, and 1935. The Florida Archives has a photo of him. He was involved in establishing Flagler County.

== Personal life ==
He married and had two daughters, Gertrude M. Calhoun and May Hendricks, as well as a son, Emmett MacWilliams.

== Death ==
MacWilliams died on January 9, 1914, and was buried in St. Augustine, Florida.
