= W. D. Childers =

American politician

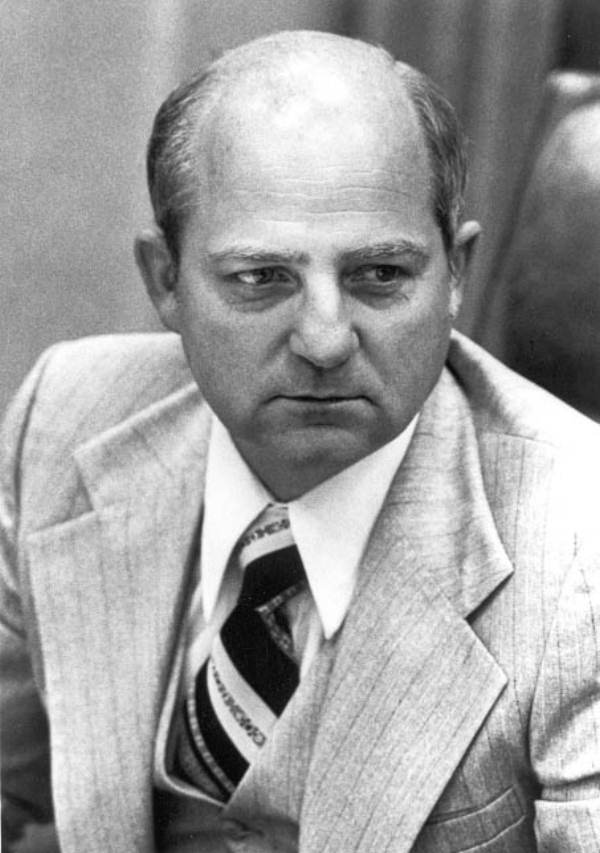
- Senator W. D. Childers, 1979

Member of the Escambia County Commission from the 1st district
- In office 2000–2002
- Preceded by: Mike Whitehead
- Succeeded by: Cliff Barnhart

President of the Florida Senate
- In office November 18, 1980 – November 16, 1982
- Preceded by: Phil Lewis
- Succeeded by: Curtis Peterson

Member of the Florida Senate
- In office November 17, 1970 – November 21, 2000
- Preceded by: Reubin Askew
- Succeeded by: Durell Peaden
- Constituency: 2nd (1970–1972); 1st (1972–2000)

Personal details
- Born: November 25, 1933 (age 92) Crackers Neck, Florida
- Spouse: Ruth Adell Johnson
- Children: Gail, Jeanna, Karen and Marvel
- Education: Florida State University (BS)

Wyon Dale "W. D." Childers (born November 25, 1933) is a former politician from West Florida who served 30 years in the State Senate, from 1970 to 2000, including a stint as President of the Florida Senate from 1980 to 1982 and as dean from 1988 to 2000. He holds the title of Florida's longest-serving state legislator. He earned the nickname "Banty Rooster" – after the diminutive, swaggering barnyard fowl – and became known for his eccentric mannerisms and colorful, folksy expressions. Childers was popular in his district for the ample state funding and "turkey" projects he sent home, including $12.5 million for the Pensacola Civic Center and the I-110 extension to Gregory Street. Initially a Democrat, he switched to the Republican Party in 1995.

After term limits forced him from the Florida Senate in 2000, Childers ran for the District 1 seat of the Escambia County Commission.

He became embroiled in the soccer complex corruption scandal and was found guilty of violating the Florida Sunshine Law and of bribing Commissioner Willie Junior to help push the purchases of two properties, totaling $6.2 million, from Childers' associates Joe and Georgann Elliott. Childers served nearly three years of a 42-month prison sentence in West Palm Beach and was released on 17 June 2009, after which he relocated away from Pensacola. On 8 June 2010, a federal appeals court overturned the bribery conviction, ruling that Childers' constitutional right to confront his accuser had been violated, as the defense team was not allowed to question Junior on his change of testimony. On 2 June, 2011, the 11th Circuit Court of Appeals in Atlanta reinstated the bribery conviction, thereby denying Childers from participating in the State Retirement System.

== Early life and education ==
Born in Wright, Florida (then known as Crackers Neck), Wyon Dale Childers attended the Bay County High School and went on to Florida State University, where he met Ruth Adell Johnson. They were married on 21 December 1953. Childers graduated with a Bachelor of Science degree in education in 1955. He became a math teacher and supplemented his salary with roofing work and door-to-door sales. He capitalized on the sale of trendy items – hula hoops in the 50s, color televisions in the 60s – and also practiced real estate.

== Florida Senate career ==
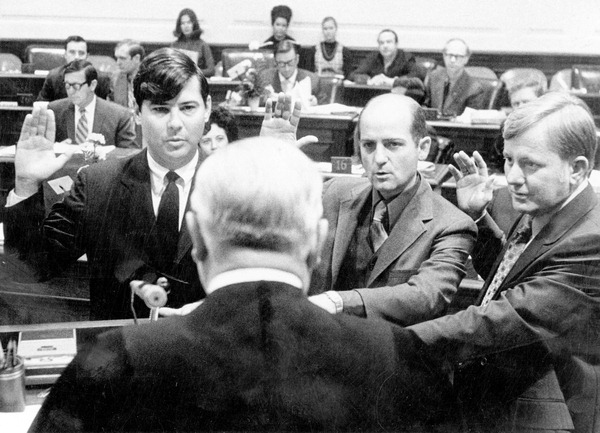
Childers, center, is sworn into the Florida State Senate. Future governor and U.S. senator Bob Graham stands at left.

In 1970 Childers ran for the Florida Senate seat vacated by Reubin Askew.

Childers was for many years chair of the General Government Appropriations Committee, which established budgets for most of the state agencies. He was considered a master of so-called "turkey" projects that were tacked onto other bills and sent state funding back to his home district. Some of the local projects that benefited from his influence included:

- Pensacola Civic Center
- I-110 extension from Maxwell/Jordan Streets south to Gregory Street
- Four-laning of US 29 north to Alabama border
- Big Lagoon State Park
- Blue Angel Parkway
- M. C. Blanchard Judicial Building
- Sewer system at Century
- Computer center at UWF
- Science building at PJC
- Athletics at UWF & PJC
- T. T. Wentworth Museum
- Pensacola Historic District
- Naval Aviation Museum
- Saenger Theatre restoration
- Establishment of ECUA and PEDC
- Santa Rosa Island Bike Trail
- Ellyson Field
- Perdido Key Fire Station
- Bayou Chico and Bayou Texar restoration projects

He was repeatedly honored by other legislators with Allen Morris Awards: for Most Effective in Debate 1975, '76 and '80; Most Effective in Committee 1978; and Most Effective Member of the Senate, 1979.

In 1980 Childers pushed the state legislature to buy land for the Big Lagoon State Park from a Pensacola auto dealer. He was called before a grand jury when it was revealed that he owned another piece of property with Fiveash, and he claimed he had not made the "mental connection" between the two properties. The grand jury cleared him of wrongdoing and praised him as "an example to other public servants who, having sought the public trust, are asked to show that they deserve it."

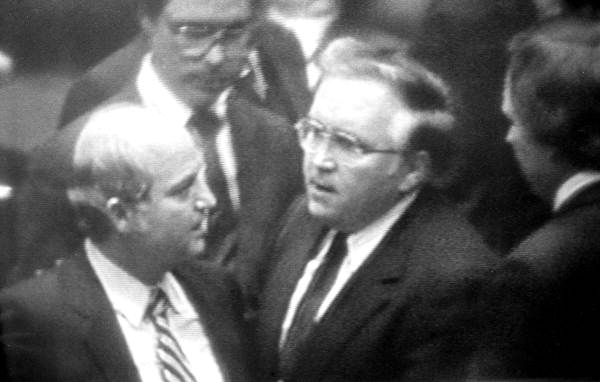
An argument between Childers (left) and Senator Dempsey Barron (right) nearly comes to blows on the Senate floor. Senator Ed Dunn of Daytona Beach is shown between the two.

On 1 June 1981, an argument between Childers and Senator Dempsey Barron over a bill nearly resulted in a fight on the Senate floor. Barron later organized a group of legislators that effectively stripped Childers of his power as Senate President.

Everybody says they want us to behave like in church. But the truth is, they like to see a good scrap. The most productive things that happened when I was in the Legislature was when we had the most fights. … If you want to make progress and make changes, you've got to get people's dander up.

In 1993 Childers worked with attorney Fred Levin to draft legislation that would amend the Florida Medicaid Third Party Recovery Act, enabling the State of Florida to sue the tobacco industry for the costs of treating illnesses caused by cigarette smoking. The bill was pushed through quickly and signed into law by Governor Lawton Chiles before it could attract the attention of the tobacco industry's lobbyists. The legislation ultimately led to a class action lawsuit that yielded a $13.2 billion settlement for the State of Florida.

=== Term limits ===
Due to the "Eight is Enough" constitutional amendment passed by Florida voters in 1992, which limited legislators' terms of office to eight consecutive years, Childers' name was not allowed on the ballot in 2000. He considered running for his Senate seat regardless as a write-in candidate, exploiting a loophole in the amendment's wording – and even received a concession from election officials that would allow voters to write just the letters "W. D." – but later decided to serve as Escambia County Commissioner for one term, until he could constitutionally reclaim his Senate seat.

== Escambia County Commission ==
Childers ran for the Escambia County District 1 seat formerly held by Mike Whitehead, who was preparing a campaign to challenge Escambia County Clerk of Court Ernie Lee Magaha. Childers' opponents in the race were Democrat Williemae Stanberry and Reform Party candidate Teddy Laviano. Despite a commanding lead over both opponents, Childers ran a series of negative ads in the final weeks of the campaign.

They told us that it would cost us 5 to 12 percent if we ran those ads. I had that much to spare. I'd do it again. I like tough campaigning. I imagine I could have raised the percentage points by being Mr. Sweet and Clean, but that ain't W.D., and I've got to be W.D.

After the election, Childers appointed Stanberry to an interim post on the Board of Adjustment. She said there were no grudges between them: "We never had a bad relationship – that's just the way W. D. does politics."

On 7 June 2001, Childers replaced Tom Banjanin, who was considering a run against U.S. Representative Joe Scarborough, as commission chairman. He organized a voting bloc with commissioners Willie Junior and Mike Bass that was able to pass any motion over the opposition of Banjanin and Terry Smith. After six county leaders resigned between October '01 and February '02 – county administrator Tom Forrest, assistant administrator Bill Neron, acting administrator Gregg Welstead, county engineer Cindy Anderson, parks and recreation director Mark Thornton, and county attorney David Tucker – many blamed the exodus on Childers' brusque leadership style. It was during this same time frame that Childers, Junior and Bass pushed through two contentious land purchases that would lead to indictments and scandal.

=== Corruption scandal ===
On 4 October 2001, Commissioner Willie Junior proposed, as an add-on to the commission agenda, to negotiate a purchase price for the Pensacola Soccer Complex. The motion was approved unanimously. On 1 November, the commission voted 3–2 to use $3.9 million in local option sales tax funds to buy the property, and they formally closed on 20 November. On 10 January 2002, Junior made another add-on motion to purchase the former Stalnaker Mazda property for $2.3 million, which was approved 3–2. In both votes, Childers and Bass affirmed Junior's motion while Banjanin and Smith opposed.

State Attorney Curtis Golden announced on 7 February an investigation into the commission over possible corruption related to the land purchases. In testimony before a grand jury, Childers revealed that he had written around $90,000 in checks to Commissioner Junior, but insisted they were "loans".

On 30 April, four commissioners were booked into Escambia County Jail on 27 charges, which included bribery, racketeering, and violating the state's Sunshine Law. Governor Jeb Bush suspended the four indicted commissioners on 1 May 1 and appointed temporary replacements on 10 May. Former Pensacola News Journal publisher Cliff Barnhart was tapped to fill the District 1 seat.

Childers was charged with additional counts of money laundering and bribery on 16 June, but was released from jail on $50,000 bond.

On 28 June, he was convicted on one count of violating Sunshine Law over a call he and Commissioner Smith made to Supervisor of Elections Bonnie Jones over country redistricting. Meanwhile, Commissioner Junior pleaded no contest to 10 felony charges and one misdemeanor charge relating to misdeeds that had been committed during his tenure as commissioner.

The Pensacola Soccer Complex had been purchased by Joe and Georgann Elliott for $3.3 million. The county purchased the property for $3.9 million, netting the Elliotts a profit of around $561,000. According to the state's allegations, they paid a bribe of $200,000 to Childers, who in turn paid around $100,000 to Junior. Junior testified that Childers had given him a stainless steel "collard-green pot" full of cash a few days after the county closed on the property, which he transferred to a paper bag at his home. He also claimed to have received $10,000 from Joe Elliott directly, the day before the vote to buy the property. Wanting to deposit some of the money in a bank, but fearful of the government reporting requirements of depositing cash, he returned $40,000 to Childers in exchange for a cashier's check for the same amount. Junior later received several other checks from Childers totaling $90,000.

On April 10, Childers was found guilty of two charges of bribery and unlawful compensation. Willie Junior was found dead under a downtown home's front porch after a neighbor noticed a strange smell. His cause of death never really came to light. In two separate jury trials, Joe and Georgann Elliot were acquitted of all charges in December 2002 and April 2004, respectively.

Florida Senate
Preceded by Reubin Askew	Member of the Florida Senate from the 2nd district 1970–1972	Succeeded by James A. Johnston
Preceded by John Broxson	Member of the Florida Senate from the 1st district 1972–2000	Succeeded by Durell Peaden
Political offices
Preceded by Philip D. Lewis	President of the Florida Senate; 1980–1982	Succeeded by N. Curtis Peterson, Jr.
Preceded by Mike Whitehead	Member of the Escambia County Commission from the 1st district 2000–2002	Succeeded by Cliff Barnhart
