= Joseph Kennelly =

American politician (1920–1999)

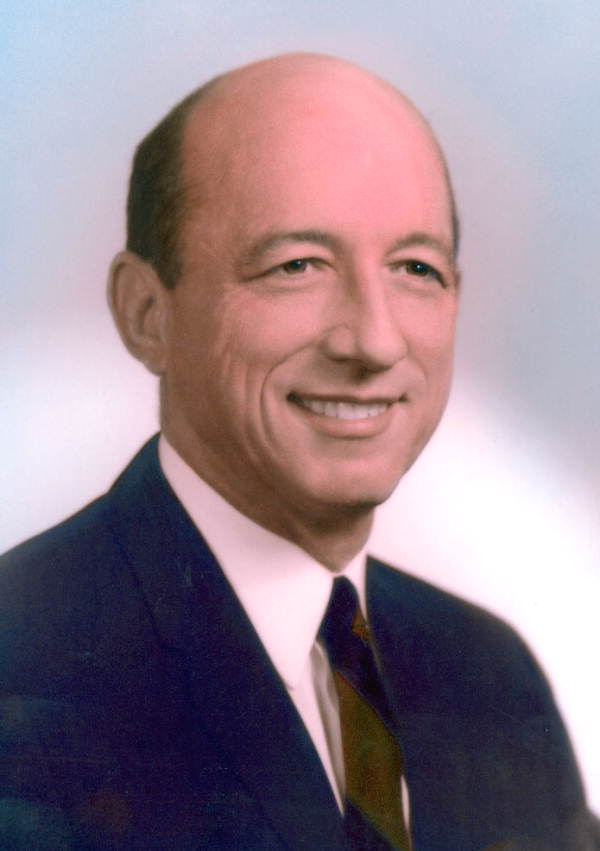
- Kennelly in 1966

Member of the Florida House of Representatives from Duval County
- In office 1966–1967

Member of the Florida House of Representatives from the 28th district
- In office 1967–1968
- Preceded by: District established
- Succeeded by: Harry W. Westberry

Member of the Florida House of Representatives from the 24th district
- In office 1970–1972
- Preceded by: Fred Schultz
- Succeeded by: Ander Crenshaw

Personal details
- Born: August 28, 1920 Plant City, Florida, U.S.
- Died: October 12, 1999 (aged 79)
- Party: Democratic
- Education: University of Florida

Joseph G. Kennelly Jr. (August 28, 1920 – October 12, 1999) was an American politician. He served as a Democratic member for the 24th and 28th district of the Florida House of Representatives.

== Life and career ==
Kennelly was born in Plant City, Florida. He attended the University of Florida.

In 1966, Kennelly was elected to the Florida House of Representatives. The next year, he was elected as the first representative for the newly-established 28th district. He served until 1968, when he was succeeded by Harry W. Westberry. In 1970, he was elected to represent the 24th district, succeeding Fred Schultz. He served until 1972, when he was succeeded by Ander Crenshaw.

Kennelly died on October 12, 1999, at the age of 79.
