= Thomas Palmer (Florida politician) =

American lawyer, developer, and politician

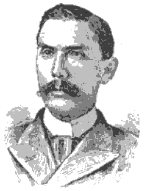

Member of the Florida Senate
- In office 1896, 1897, 1901

Personal details
- Born: 1859 Washington County, Georgia
- Died: August 11, 1946 (aged 87) Tampa, Florida
- Spouse: Ruby Brooks (m. 1899; died 1945)
- Occupation: Lawyer, politician

Thomas Palmer (1859–1946) was an American lawyer, developer, and politician in Florida representing Tampa. He served in the Florida Senate including as President of the Florida Senate.

== Biography ==
Thomas Palmer was born in Washington County, Georgia in 1859.

He earned a law degree from the University of Virginia in 1888.

He moved to Tampa in 1889, and shortly afterward was elected mayor of Brooksville, Florida.

He married Ruby Brooks in April 1899.

He was a state senator in 1896 and 1897. In 1901, he represented Tampa and the 11th District.

He proposed stone tablets dating to Spanish occupation in Florida be incorporated into an expansion of the Florida State Capitol. The tablets and the owner's home furnishings were acquired instead by Henry Flagler.

A lawyer and developer, he was involved in the development of the Palma Ceia neighborhood of Tampa.

In 1926 he was recorded as owning Palma Ceia Springs (sometimes formerly written as Palmaceia Springs). A pool was built on the site and a streetcar stop was part of the Port Tampa to Ballast Point line. What remains of the spring can be found at Fred Ball Park alongside Bayshore Boulevard.

In 1909, he was involved in organizing a citrus exchange and used the one in California as a model. He reported the headquarters of the Florida Citrus Exchange would be located in Tampa.

Thomas Palmer died at his home in Tampa on August 11, 1946.
