= Wallace E. Sturgis =

American judge, politician

Wallace Sturgis
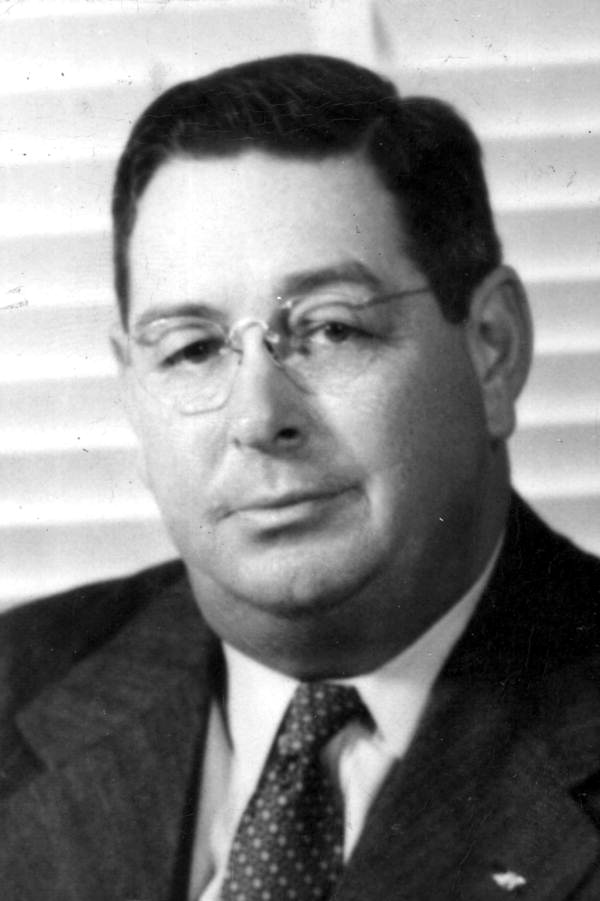
- Sturgis in the 19547

Member of the Florida Senate
- In office 1943–1956

Personal details
- Born: Wallace Edwin Sturgis; 1898 Swiftwater, Mississippi, U.S.
- Died: March 1966 (aged 67–68) Tallahassee, Florida, U.S.
- Education: George Washington University (LLB)

Military service
- Branch/service: United States Army
- Battles/wars: World War I

Wallace Edwin Sturgis Sr. (1898–1966) was an American politician, attorney, and jurist in the state of Florida. He served as a member of the Florida Senate and President of the Florida Senate.

== Background ==
In an interview with the Ocala Evening Star, Sturgis stated that he was born on a cotton plantation in Swiftwater, Mississippi. A talented student, he became the youngest member of his class at the Mississippi Agricultural and Mechanical College. He left college in 1916 to enlist in the United States Army, where he was stationed at the Mexico–United States border in Texas. After the start of World War I, Sturgis was stationed in France and as a commissioned officer.

After the war, Sturgis entered law school at the University of Virginia School of Law, though he completed his coursework at George Washington University Law School. While a law student, he worked at the United States General Land Office in Washington, D.C.

In 1928, Sturgis left Washington, D.C. and established a private legal practice in Ocala, Florida. He was a leader in his local chapter of the American Legion and became active in the Republican Party of Florida. In 1943, he was elected to the Florida Senate. In 1956, Sturgis resigned from the legislature to serve as a circuit court judge. He also served as the chair of the state Constitution Advisory Committee. A case was filed against him for his actions as judge.

Sturgis died in March 1966 of a heart attack at Tallahassee Memorial Hospital.
