= Charles J. Perrenot =

American politician

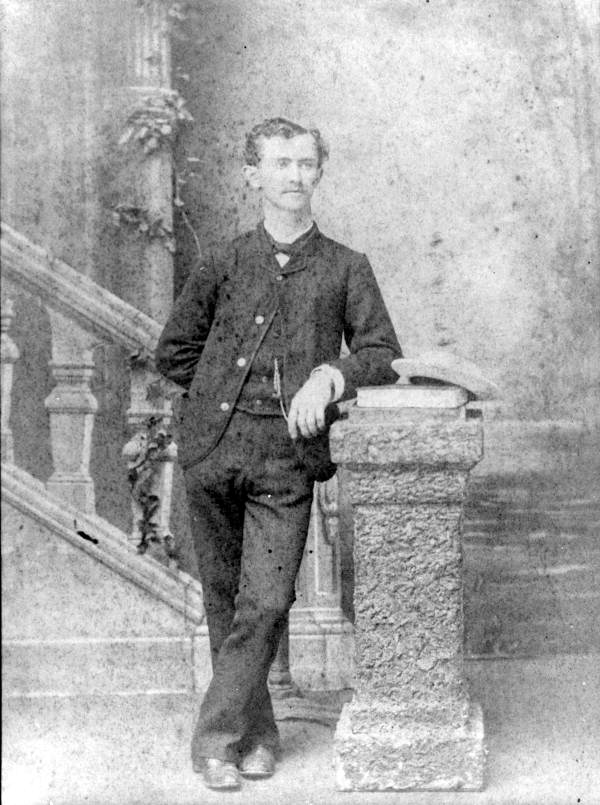
Portrait of Perrenot, taken October 1, 1887

Charles J. Perrenot (August 22, 1859 - January 18, 1898) was a politician in Florida. He served as president of the Florida Senate.

Perrenot was born August 22, 1859, in Milton, Florida. The family was French. Perrenot had family member in Texas who were involved in politics. He studied law in the office of George G. McWhorter, and in 1882 was admitted to the bar, then starting up his own practice in Milton.

Perrenot was listed as a state senator representing district 1 in Santa Rosa County, Florida, in 1893. He was elected Senate President in 1897. Ernest Amos was a law clerk for him.

In 1898 a lawyer Charles J. Perrenot was reported recently deceased in Milton, Florida.
