= James E. Calkins =

American politician

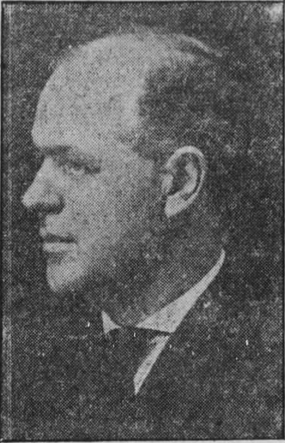
James E. Calkins (cica 1919)

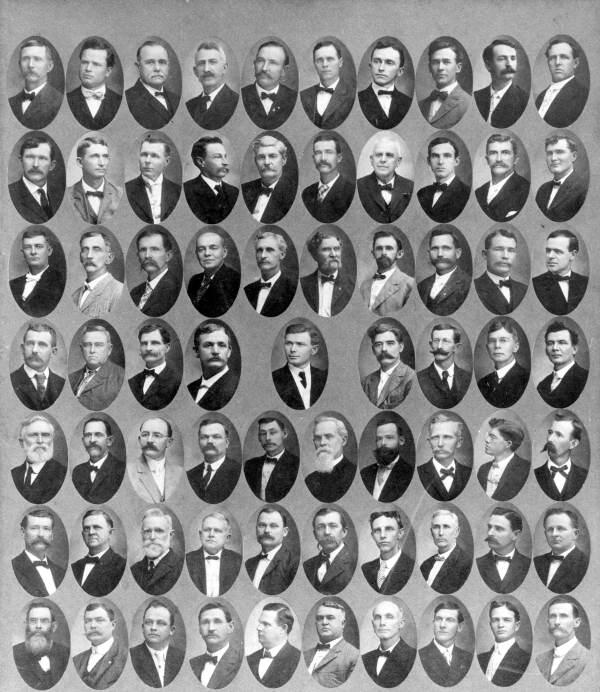
Members of the 1907 House of Representatives - Tallahassee, Florida

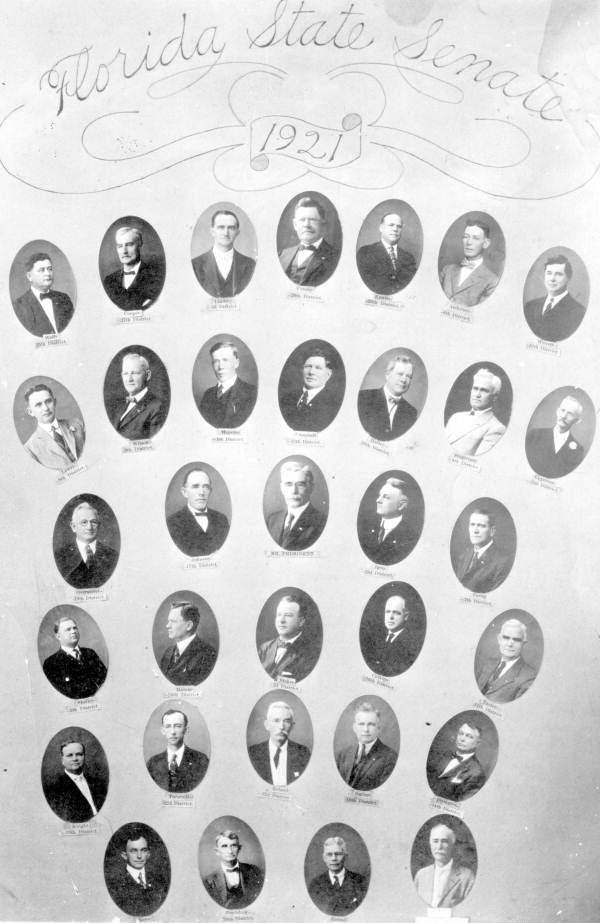
Members of the 1921 Florida Senate - Tallahassee, Florida

James E. Calkins (October 6, 1878 - January 26, 1963) was a lawyer and politician in Florida. He served in the Florida House of Representatives in 1907 and 1909 and Florida Senate in 1915 and 1921 including as President of the Florida Senate.

He was born in Nassau County, Florida and was the son of one of the original Florida pioneers.

He obtained his law degree in 1901 from the University of Georgia, and started practicing law in Fernandina. He was a commerce lawyer.

In 1921 he was appointed to be the special council for the Florida Railway Commission where he served until he founded the law partnership Loftin, Stokes & Calkins

He served as the mayor of Fernandina.

In 1919, he served as a commissioner overseeing the publication of Florida's general statutes.

He was photographed with Duncan U. Fletcher and Park Trammell in 1925. The Library of Congress has the image.

He died January 26, 1963, and was reported as being 82, but an image of his gravestone shows a date of birth of October 6, 1878 making his 84. He was survived by two sisters.
