= Dan Mica =

American politician (born 1944)

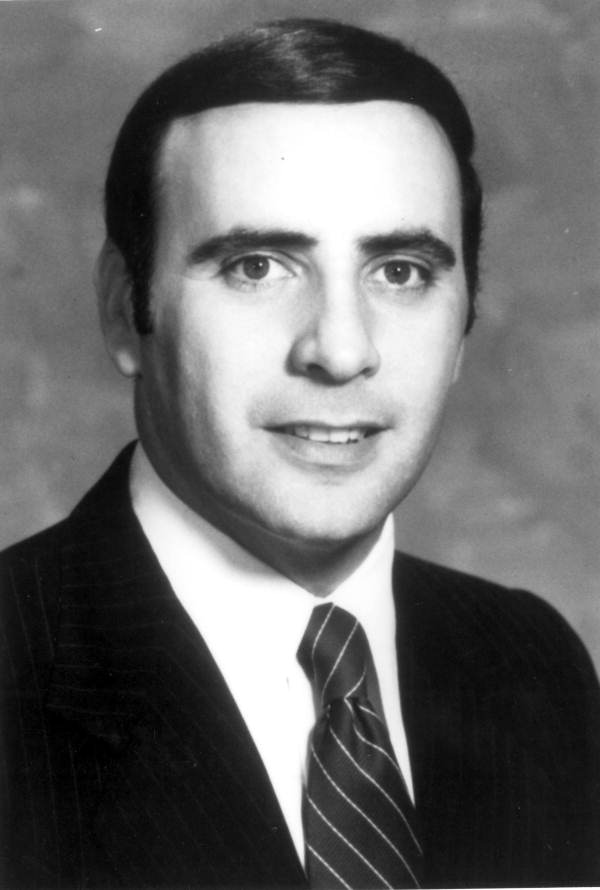

Member of the U.S. House of Representatives from Florida
- In office January 3, 1979 – January 3, 1989
- Preceded by: Paul Rogers
- Succeeded by: Harry Johnston
- Constituency: 11th district (1979–1983); 14th district (1983–1989)

Personal details
- Born: Daniel Andrew Mica; February 4, 1944 (age 82) Binghamton, New York, U.S.
- Party: Democratic
- Relatives: John Mica (brother)
- Education: University of Florida; Florida Atlantic University (BA)

Daniel Andrew Mica (born February 4, 1944) is an American politician who was a U.S. representative from the state of Florida.

== Education ==
Daniel Mica attended the University of Florida, but received his Bachelor of Arts degree from Florida Atlantic University in 1966. He was subsequently awarded an honorary Doctor of Laws degree from the same institution. He also holds an honorary law degree from Barry University.

During his time at FAU he served as the university's first student government president.

Mica and his brother, John, are members of the Delta Chi Fraternity from the University of Florida.

== Career ==
=== Politics ===
From 1968 to 1978, Daniel Mica was the chief of staff to Congressman Paul Rogers. He succeeded Rogers in 1979 and subsequently served five terms in the U.S. House of Representatives representing Florida's 11th district

As a five-term member of the U.S. House of Representatives, Mica served his home state of Florida from 1979 to 1989 and made his mark as a bipartisan consensus-builder. He was on the House Foreign Affairs Committee, Select Committee on Aging, and Veteran's Affairs Committee. He also served in the House leadership as deputy whip; and he was a member of the U.S. Secretary of State's Commission on Terrorism (the "Inman Commission").

His accomplishments while in Congress include investigating management corruption at the largest government-funded health maintenance organization (HMO) in the country, authoring anti-terrorism legislation that was enacted into law and reorganizing the federal court system by adding a new court district that helped relieve the system's backlog of cases.

While serving in Congress, Mica was appointed by President Ronald Reagan to be congressional representative to the United Nations. President Bush appointed him to the board for International Broadcasting in 1991, and President Bill Clinton selected him to serve as chairman of the board of Radio Free Europe/Radio Liberty in 1993.

In 1988 Mica ran for the U.S. Senate seat being vacated by Lawton Chiles. Mica finished 3rd in the Democratic primary.

After leaving Capitol Hill, Mica joined the American Council of Life Insurers in 1989 as an executive vice president specializing in Federal Affairs. He remained in this position until 1996.

=== Credit Union National Association ===
In July 1996, Mica was named president and chief executive officer of the Credit Union National Association (CUNA). He stepped down from CUNA in 2010.

== Family ==
Mica is married and has four children. He is the brother of politician John Mica, a Republican who represented Florida's 7th Congressional District from 1993 until 2017. Mica and his brother are the only two sibling members of US House of Representatives in history from different political parties. His daughter, Christine, is the current Dean of University Admissions for The Catholic University of America.

U.S. House of Representatives
Preceded by Paul Rogers	Member of the U.S. House of Representatives from Florida's 11th congressional district 1979–1983	Succeeded by Bill Nelson
Preceded by Claude Pepper	Member of the U.S. House of Representatives from Florida's 14th congressional district 1983–1989	Succeeded by Harry Johnston
U.S. order of precedence (ceremonial)
Preceded by Skip Bafalis as Former U.S. Representative	Order of precedence of the United States as Former U.S. Representative	Succeeded by Dan Miller as Former U.S. Representative
