= R. J. Floyd =

American politician (died 1860)

Robert J. Floyd (died 1860) was a lawyer who served as a state legislator in Florida. He served in the Florida House of Representatives and the Florida Senate representing Franklin County, Florida. He also served as President of the Florida Senate.

He was the son of Appalachicola pioneer settler Gabriel Floyd. In 1845 he chaired a Florida House committee determining rules for circuit judgeship appointments. In 1847 he issued a statement of protest to a taxation bill that passed in the state senate.

A wealthy man, he owned St. Vincent Island. He served as Collector of Customs in Appalachicola in the late 1850s.

His only son, Gabriel Floyd, died in the American Civil War.
