= Jesse J. Parrish =

American citrus grower and politician in Florida (1877–1948)

Jesse J. Parrish Sr. (October 11, 1877 – 1948) was a citrus grower and politician in Florida. He served as President of the Florida Senate in 1929. He lived in Titusville and represented Brevard County in the Florida Legislature. He established a shipping association for citrus growers and advocated for the citrus industry during more than two decades in the legislature.

Parrish was born in Bowling Green, Florida to Benjamin J. Parrish. He held executive positions with citrus and banking companies. In 1903, he married Emma L. Hickey. He was a member of various fraternal organizations.

In 1929, he defaulted on a loan from Brevard County Bank.

Parrish was inducted into the Florida Citrus Hall of Fame.

Jess Parrish Hospital in Titusville is named in his honor. His son, Jesse J. Parrish Jr. was also a prominent businessman involved in the citrus industry. Parrish was one of the wealthiest people on Florida, and his grandson, J. J. Parrish III, continued the family's citrus business.

Parrish and his family were photographed in their citrus grove, and his packinghouse was also photographed.
