= Robert Andrew Gray =

American politician

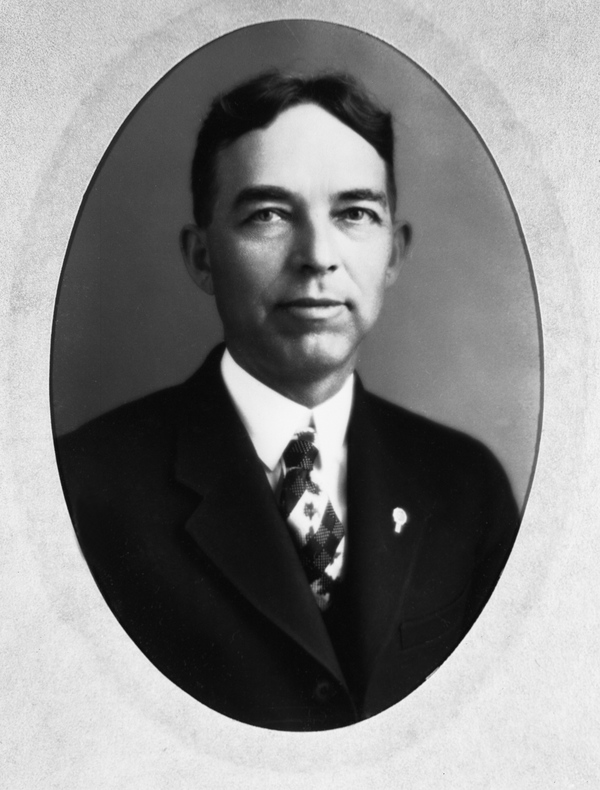
Robert Andrew Gray circa 1930)

Robert Andrew Gray (1882–1975) was an American politician from Florida. From 1930 to 1961, he served as Florida Secretary of State. To date, he is the longest-serving Secretary of State. Earlier in his career he represented Gadsden County in the Florida Legislature.

== Early life ==
Robert Andrew Gray was born in Georgia in 1882 to a Methodist preacher and his wife. The family moved to North Florida when Gray was six months old, settling near Tallahassee. In 1899 at age 16, Gray enrolled at the South Florida Military College, where he studied under former Confederate Army General Evander M. Law, whom Gray credited to having a "formative effect" on his life. After General Law was forced to resign his position at the school due to political controversy in 1903, Gray and his fellow students refused to graduate and dropped out of school. Later that same year, Gray married "Grace Mullins, the daughter of a local Baptist minister". The two moved to Havana in Gadsden County.

== Political career ==
After a brief period in education and the newspaper industry, Gray ran for the Gadsden County seat in the Florida House of Representatives in 1910 and won. Gray would serve in the House until 1913.

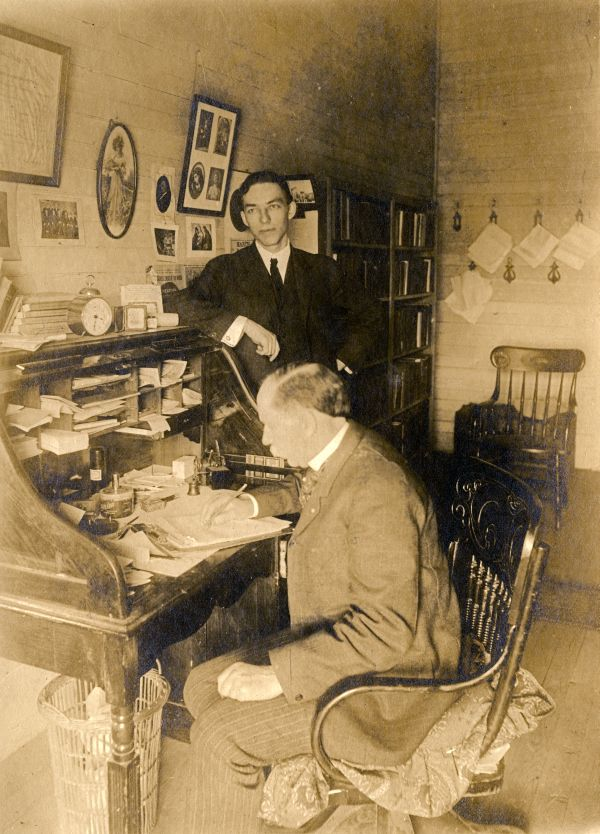
Secretary of State R.A. Gray (standing) in office with Comptroller Ernest Amos (seated) in Tallahassee (circa 1930)

After his time in the legislature, Gray continued work in government, working as a personal secretary for Governor Park Trammell and for the State Auditor's office.

In 1930, Florida Governor Doyle Carlton appointed Gray Secretary of State, a position he would hold for the next 31 years through several gubernatorial administrations. He left office in 1961, as the longest-serving secretary of state. In office, Gray was remembered as being fiscally conservative and deeply committed to public service.

== Legacy ==
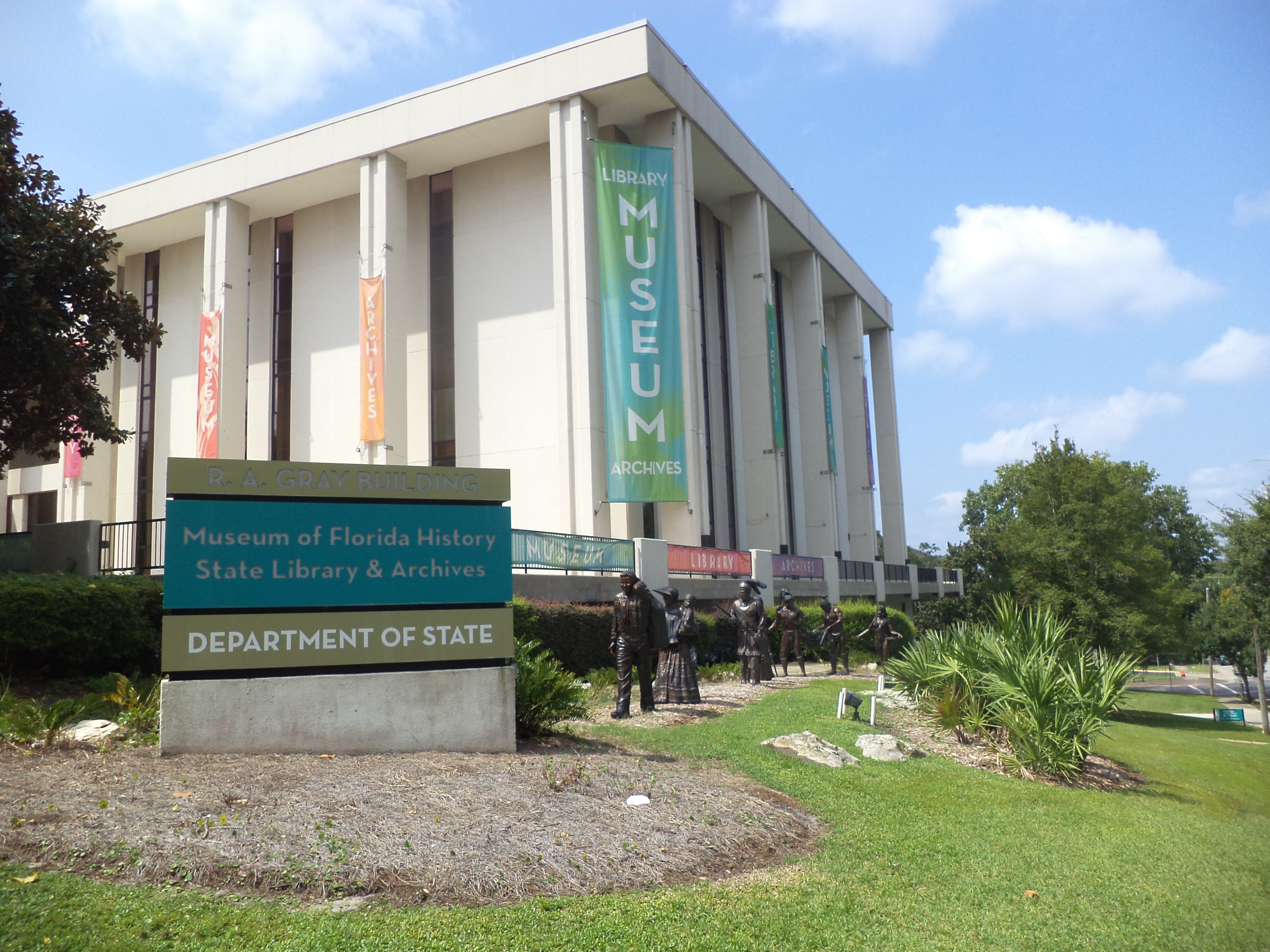
R. A. Gray Building

The R. A. Gray Building at 500 South Bronough Street in Tallahassee houses the Florida State Archives and State Museum of Florida.

== Books ==
- Gray, Robert Andrew (1958). My Story: Fifty Years in the Shadow of the Near Great. Rose Printing Company.
- Gray, Robert A. (1921). Gray's Civil Government of Florida: With Introductory Chapters on General Civics and Supplement Containing the Constitution of the State. R. A. Gray.
