= Santa Rosa County Sheriff's Office =

Law enforcement agency in Florida, U.S.

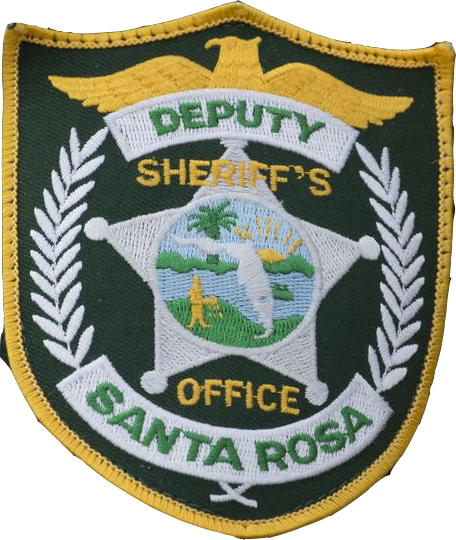
- Santa Rosa County Sheriff's Office Patch
- Abbreviation: SRSO

Jurisdictional structure
- Operations jurisdiction: Santa Rosa, Florida, USA
- Map of Santa Rosa County Sheriff's Office's jurisdiction
- Area: 1,174 square miles (3,040 km^{2})
- Population: 161,096
- General nature: Civilian police

Operational structure
- Headquarters: 5755 E Milton Rd, Milton, Florida 32583
- Agency executives: Bob Johnson, Sheriff; Randy Tifft, Chief Deputy Sheriff

Website
- santarosasheriff.org

The Santa Rosa County Sheriff's Office (SRSO) is the primary law enforcement agency of Santa Rosa County, Florida. Both the cities of Gulf Breeze and Milton operates their own LEOs (law enforcement organization); however, the sheriff's office operates the majority of law enforcement operations within the county. SRSO is headed by a sheriff, who serves a four-year term and is elected in a partisan primary election.

== Offices & facilities ==
The main offices are in Milton. District offices are located in Navarre, Gulf Breeze, Pace, and Jay

== Administration ==
=== District Field Offices ===
District One - Gulf Breeze Area District Two - Navarre Area District Three - Pace Area District Four - East Milton Area District Five - Jay Area

=== Rank structure ===
Insignia	Rank Title	Information
	Sheriff	Elected official and commander of the SRCSO.
	Chief Deputy	Second-in-command of the SRCSO and responsible for day-to-day operations.
	Assistant Chief Deputy	Third-in-command of the SRCSO.
	Colonel	Commander of Detentions and Operations.
	Major	Commander of a Bureau.
	Captain	Commander of a Division.
	Lieutenant	Commander of a District or Unit.
	Sergeant	Commander of a shift or Squad.
	Deputy	

== Services Provided for Citizens ==
- Citizens' Law Enforcement Academy
- Volunteer Program
- Civilian Observer ( please see website for requirements )
- Citizen's Firearm Safety
- Crime prevention strategies
- Crime Stoppers
- Victim Assistance Program
- Explorer Program
- Fingerprint services
- "Know The Law" booklet
- ID Theft booklet

== History ==
=== List of SRSO Sheriffs ===
*Jesse Carter Allen 1842-1845 (Interim)
- William Washington Harrison 1845-1849
- James R. Mims 1849-1851
- Isaiah Cobb, Jr. 1851-1855, 1860-1861
- James C. McArthur 1855-1859
- James Milton Amos 1861-1863
- John L. McLellan 1863-1865
- Abraham.B. Dixon 1865-1867
- John W. Butler 1874-1878
- Wiliam Adam C. Benbow 1878-1881
- William Jackson Johnson 1881-1893
- John Houston Collins 1893-1897, 1909-1913
- David Mitchell 1897-1909
- John H. Harvell 1913-1921
- Henry Clay Mitchell 1921-1933
- Joseph T. Allen Sr. 1933-1945
- Marshall Rufus Hayes 1945-1957
- Bart Dell Broxson 1957-1959
- Annie Rachel Gordon Broxson 1959-1959 (Note: John_R._Broxson)
- John Broxson 1959-1961 (Note: John_R._Broxson) (Note: Doug_Broxson)
- Wade H. Cobb Sr. 1961-1968
- Leon Hinote Jr. 1968-1972
- Harvell Enfinger 1972-1981
- James A. Powell Sr. 1981-1985
- Elwyn Mauriece Coffman Jr. 1985-1992
- James F. Coats 1992-1992
- Jerry D. Brown 1992-2000
- Wendell Hall 2000–2016
- Bob Johnson 2016–Present

=== Television ===
The sheriff's office has a television show, hosted by Sheriff Johnson and Sgt. Rich Aloy on Blab TV, entitled "INSIDE SRSO". It is broadcast on Blab TV (Cox Channel 1006).

== Postcard-only policy ==
In 2010, Sheriff Wendell Hall instituted a policy that prohibited inmates from sending mail in enclosed envelopes, with the exception of privileged and legal mail. All regular correspondence was required to be done by postcard. An inmate at the jail named Marcie Hamilton filed suit against the sheriff on behalf of the class of inmates at the jail, arguing the policy violated their rights under the First and Fourteenth Amendments to the US Constitution. The Sheriff rescinded this policy just before the suit went to trial, and the parties settled in February 2012.
