= John Broxson =

American politician (1932–2019)

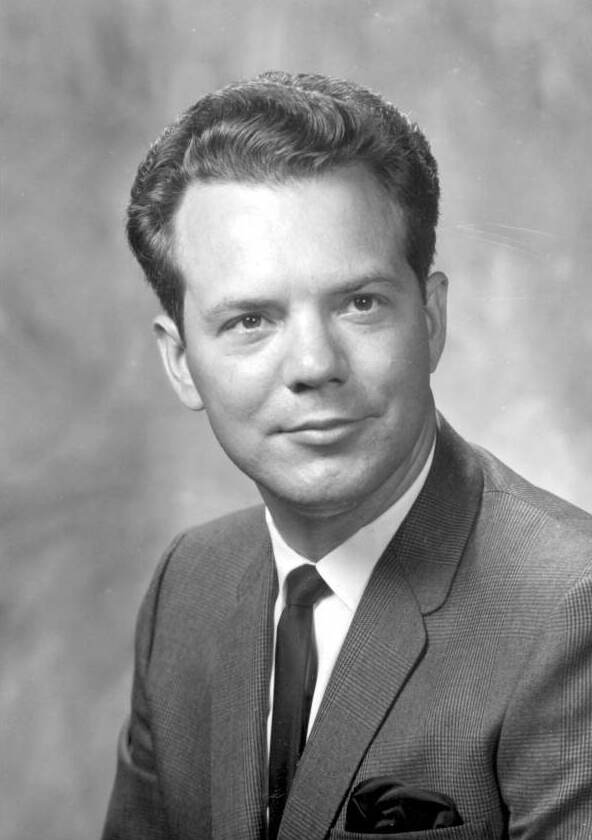

Member of the Florida Senate from the 1st district
- In office November 8, 1966 – November 7, 1972
- Preceded by: Clayton W. Mapoles
- Succeeded by: W. D. Childers

19th Sheriff of Santa Rosa County
- In office 1959–1961
- Preceded by: Annie Rachel Gordon Broxson
- Succeeded by: Wade H. Cobb Sr.

Personal details
- Born: John Ray Broxson; June 10, 1932 Holley, Florida
- Died: December 9, 2019 (aged 87)
- Party: Democratic
- Relations: Doug Broxson (brother)
- Parent: Bart Dell Broxson (father) Annie Broxson (mother)
- Education: Southwestern Assemblies of God University (BS)

John Ray Broxson (June 10, 1932 – December 9, 2019) was an American politician who served as a member of the Florida Senate from the 1st district from 1966 to 1972. A member of the Democratic Party, he previously served as the 19th sheriff of Santa Rosa County from 1959 to 1961

== Life and career ==
Broxson was born in Holley, Florida, the son Bart Dell and Annie Rachel (née Gordon) Broxson. He attended Southwestern Assemblies of God University in Texas and worked in the real estate and insurance business. In December 1959, he was appointed as sheriff of Santa Rosa County by Governor LeRoy Collins to continue the unexpired term of his father, Sheriff Bart Dell Broxson. He was elected to the State Senate in 1966, where he represented the 1st district until 1971. His brother Doug Broxson also served in the Florida House of Representatives and the Florida Senate.

Florida Senate
Preceded by Clayton W. Mapoles	Member of the Florida Senate from the 1st district 1966–1972	Succeeded by W. D. Childers
