= Theodore Turnbull =

American politician

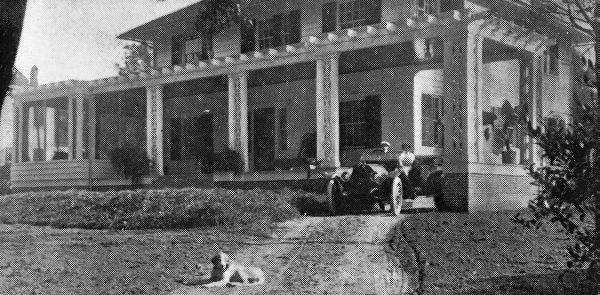
T.T. Turnbull home - Monticello, Florida

Theodore Tiffany (T. T.) Turnbull (July 7, 1881 – January 13, 1944) was an American lawyer, cotton plantation owner, and state legislator in Florida from 1915 until 1929. He served as Speaker Pro Tempore of the Florida House of Representatives and President of the Florida Senate.

== Early life ==
T.T. Turnbull was born in Jefferson County, Florida July 7, 1881, a descendant of prominent pioneer families in Florida. He studied at Emory University in Georgia.

== Career ==
Turnbull had an extensive cotton plantation. He was elected to the Florida House in 1915-1917 and Florida Senate for six sessions, representing Jefferson County, Florida. He was also the Senate President in 1923. Turnbull is in a photo of Monticello High School.

In 1927 he was appointed as attorney for the railroad commission. In 1937 he was elected as the chairman of the State Democratic Executive Committee, a position he held for five years.

In 1942 he was a candidate for the Florida Supreme Court, standing against Harold Sebring who won the seat. Turnbull had stood down from his position as State Railroad Commission attorney when deciding to run, but returned a year later after his failed run.

== Personal life ==
He married Pearl Whetstone of Gainesville in 1911. He had a son and grandson with the same name.

He died at home January 13, 1944 after having the flu for several days. He was survived by his widow, son and two daughters.
