= Joe Carlucci =

American politician

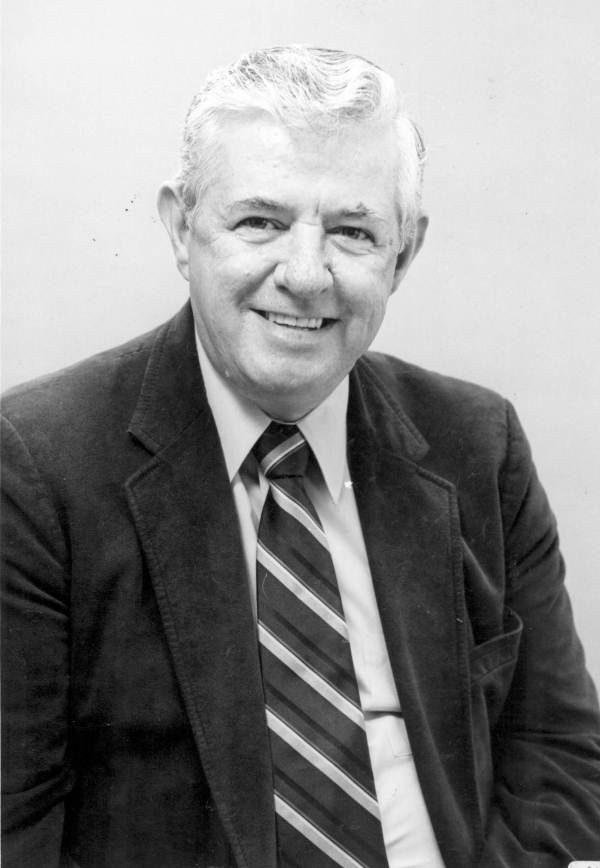
- Official portrait, 1978

Member of the Florida Senate from the 8th district
- In office November 21, 1978 – January 25, 1986
- Preceded by: Lew Brantley
- Succeeded by: Ander Crenshaw

Member of the Jacksonville City Council
- In office 1968–1978

Personal details
- Born: January 5, 1929 New York City, New York
- Died: January 25, 1986 (aged 57) Camilla, Georgia, U.S.
- Party: Democratic
- Spouse: Louise Carlucci
- Children: 2
- Education: Florida State University; University of Miami (JD)

Joe Carlucci (January 5, 1929 – January 25, 1986) was an American politician and insurance agent. He was a member of the Florida Senate and the Jacksonville City Council. He died at 57.

== Early life and education ==
Carlucci was born in New York City, New York. In 1945, Carlucci moved from New York City to Florida where he graduated from Florida State University and the University of Miami Law School.

== Political career ==
Carlucci started his political career in 1968 as a Democrat joining the Jacksonville city council where he served until 1978. In 1978 he would be elected into the Florida State Senate representing the 8th district where he served until his death in 1986. During Carlucci's senatorial tenure he often acted alone, and was described by one reporter as a "Maverik". He supported concealed carry attempting to pass a bill that would centralize the authority to grant concealed carry permits to the state instead of the counties. He also attempted to pass bills that would limit potential salaries politicians could draw from their campaign donation funds, and open all legislative meeting to the public. Carlucci found himself in controversy when he aired a campaign commercial that included an endorsement from Ernie Mastroianni, a prominent local journalist, with many claiming this endorsement violated journalistic ethics.

== Personal life and death ==
Carlucci was married to his wife, Louise; they had two sons.

On January 25, 1986, Carlucci died of a heart attack during a hunting trip with fellow lawmakers in Mitchell County, Georgia.
