= Erasmus Darwin Tracy =

American politician from Florida (1810–1877)

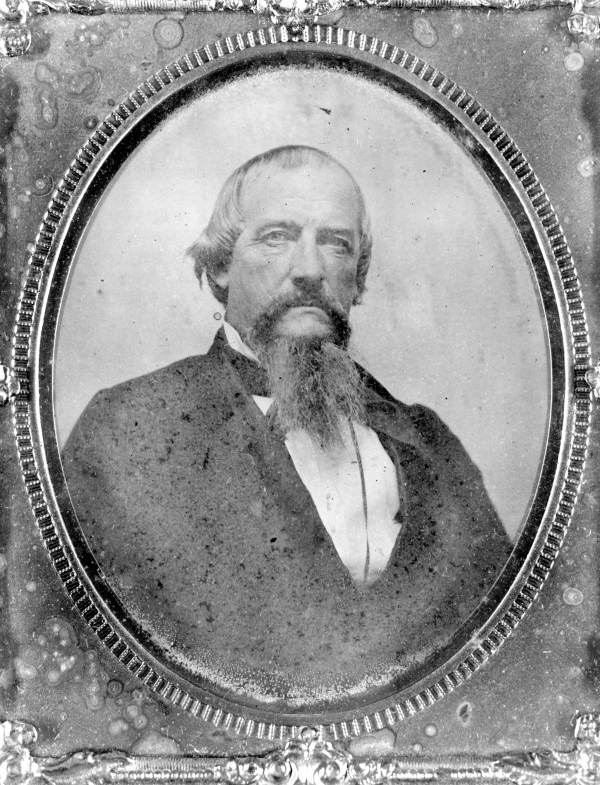
Erasmus Darwin Tracy

Erasmus Darwin Tracy (September 22, 1810 – February 18, 1877) was a Florida state legislator.

Tracy was born in Norwich, Connecticut, to Cyrus Tracy, Jr. and Hannah Snow Tracy. He represented Nassau County, Florida, in the Florida House of Representatives from 1845 to 1846 and served in the Florida State Senate from 1847 to 1848 and 1854 to 1856. From 1854 to 1855 he was President of the Florida Senate. He also presided over the 1865 Florida constitutional convention. He died in Boulogne, Florida.
