= Ernest Amos (politician) =

American politician

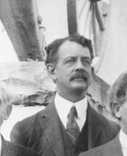
Ernest Amos (1867-1943) from photograph of Florida Governor Cary A. Hardee and cabinet. December, 1921

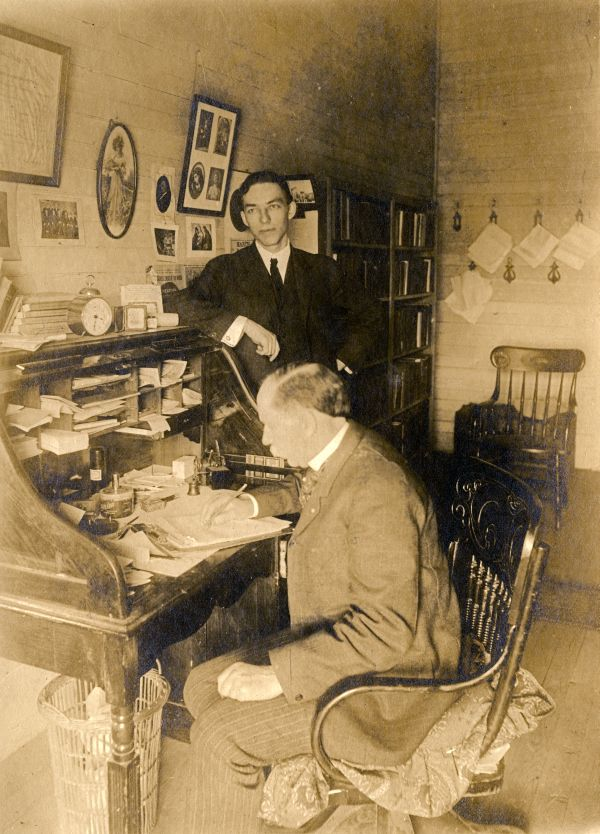
Secretary of State R.A. Gray (standing) in office with Comptroller Ernest Amos (seated) in Tallahassee (circa 1930)

Ernest Amos (1867 – February 13, 1943) was an American politician in Florida. Early in his career he was a law clerk for Charles J. Perrenot. He was elected to one term in the Florida House of Representatives in 1900 and then served as state auditor from 1904 until 1917. He also served a comptroller until 1933 when he was defeated in an election. He went on to hold lesser offices for the state. The Florida archives have a photo of him and state secretary of state R. A. Gray in an office in Tallahassee.

Amos was born 1867 and raised in Milton, Florida. His family had been prominent in the Florida Panhandle.

He was married to Eleanor Amos and had a son Ernest Amos Jr. He died February 13, 1943, fighting a brush fire on his property, it was suspected he had suffered a heart attack.
