= Lew Brantley =

American politician

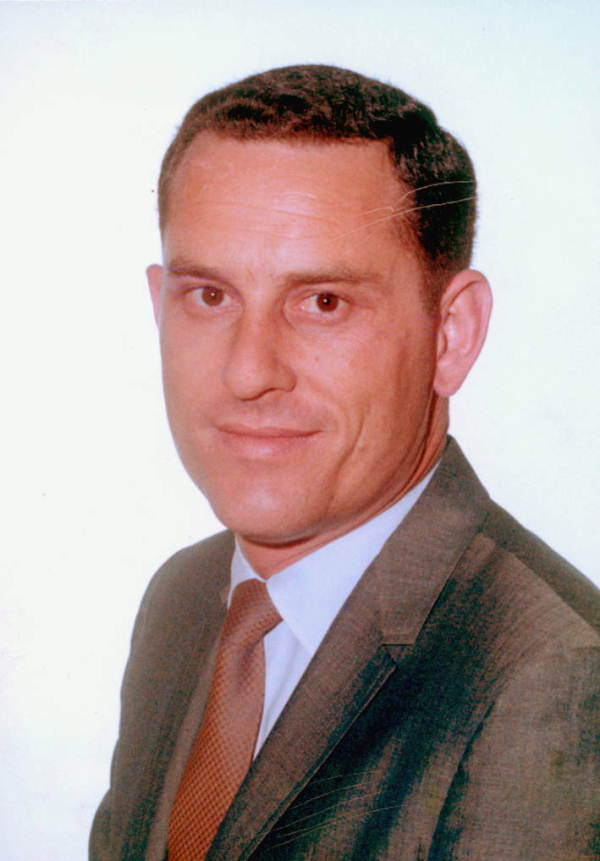
- Brantley in 1968

President of the Florida Senate
- In office November 16, 1976 – November 21, 1978
- Preceded by: Dempsey Barron
- Succeeded by: Phil Lewis

Member of the Florida Senate from the 8th district
- In office November 17, 1970 – November 21, 1978
- Preceded by: John Mathews Jr.
- Succeeded by: Joe Carlucci

Member of the Florida House of Representatives from the 21st district
- In office 1967–1970
- Preceded by: District established
- Succeeded by: Bill Birchfield

Personal details
- Born: Lewis Braxton Brantley; August 3, 1937 McRae, Georgia, U.S.
- Died: May 11, 2004 (aged 66) Jacksonville, Florida, U.S.
- Party: Democratic
- Education: Georgia Institute of Technology; Jacksonville University

Lewis Braxton Brantley (August 3, 1937 – May 11, 2004) was an American politician. He served as a Democratic member for the 21st district of the Florida House of Representatives. He also served as a member for the 8th district of the Florida Senate. He served as President of the Florida Senate.

== Life and career ==
Brantley was born in McRae, Georgia, the son of Charles and Mary Brantley. He attended Georgia Institute of Technology and Jacksonville University.

In 1966, Brantley was elected to the Florida House of Representatives. The next year, he was elected as the first representative for the newly-established 21st district. He served until 1970, when he was succeeded by Bill Birchfield. In the same year, he was elected to represent the 8th district of the Florida Senate, serving until 1978.

== Death ==
Brantley died on May 11, 2004 of lung cancer in Jacksonville, Florida, at the age of 66.
