= Ernest Amos (footballer) =

Motswana footballer

Personal information
- Full name: Ernest Amos
- Date of birth: 12 September 1975 (age 51)
- Place of birth: Botswana
- Height: 1.75 m (5 ft 9 in)
- Position: Centreback

Senior career*
Years	Team	Apps	(Gls)
2000–2008	TASC FC		
2008-2009	BDF XI		

International career^{‡}
2002–2008	Botswana	47	(0)
- * Club domestic league appearances and goals as of 29 August 2009 ‡ National team caps and goals as of 29 August 2009

Ernest Amos (born 12 September 1975) is a Motswana former footballer who played for TASC and BDF XI in the Botswana Premier League as well as the Botswana national football team.
