= Enoch J. Vann =

American politician

Enoch Jasper Vann (1832 - 1920 or 1921) was a lawyer and state legislator in Florida. He was a Whig. He represented Madison, Florida. He graduated from the University of North Carolina in 1854. As a judge he presided over a trial in Jasper, Florida. He served on a state railroad commission. He and his lawyer disputed election results from the 1878 state senate campaign.
