= 1952 Florida gubernatorial election =

- November 4, 1952
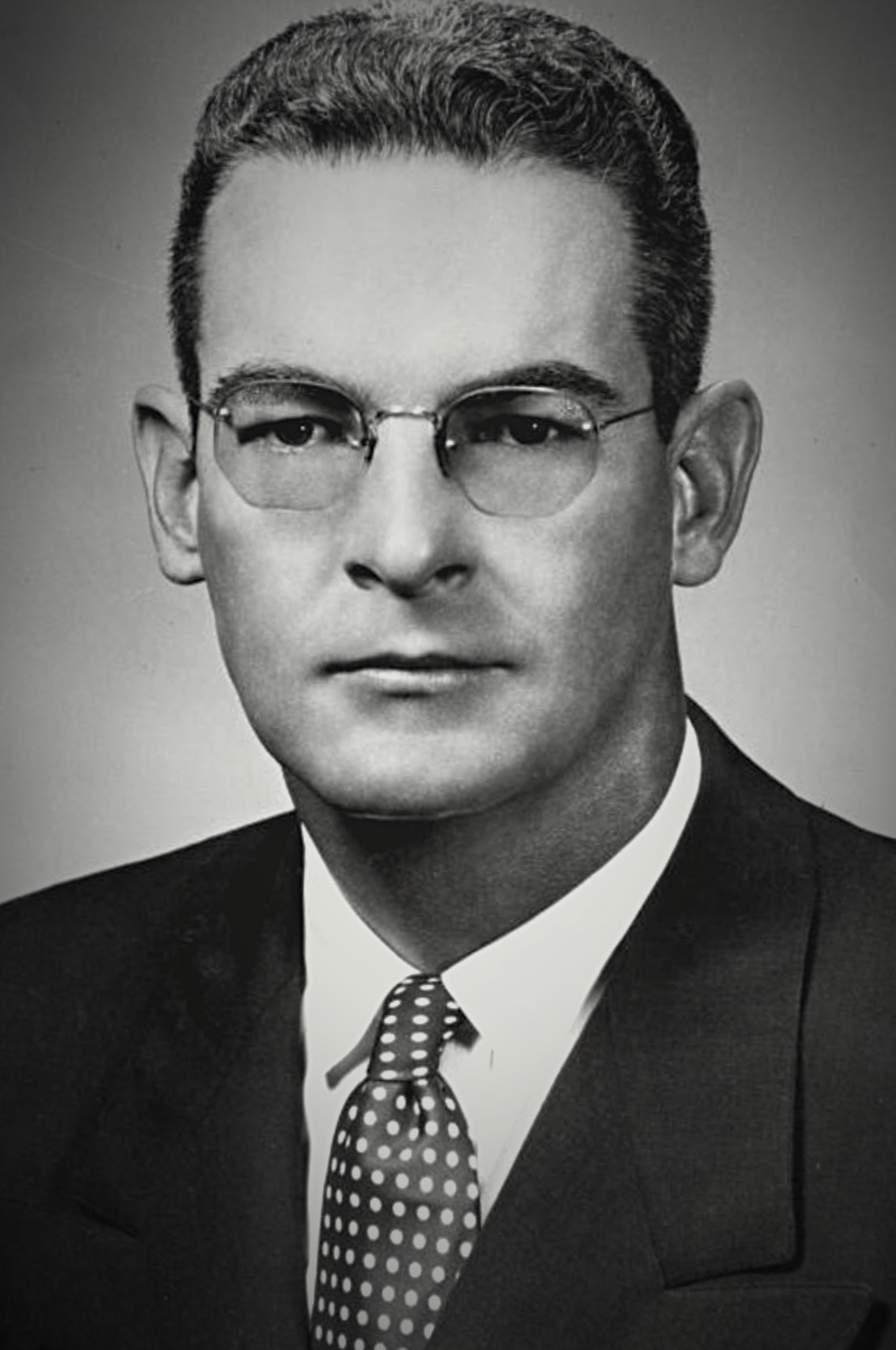

Nominee	Daniel T. McCarty	Harry S. Swan
Party	Democratic	Republican
Popular vote	624,463	210,009
Percentage	74.83%	25.17%
- County results McCarty: 50–60% 60–70% 70–80% 80–90% >90%
Governor before election
Fuller Warren
Democratic
Elected Governor
Daniel T. McCarty
Democratic

The 1952 Florida gubernatorial election was held on November 4, 1952. Democratic nominee Daniel T. McCarty defeated Republican nominee Harry S. Swan with 74.83% of the vote.

== Primary elections ==
Primary elections were held on May 6, 1952.

=== Democratic primary ===
37.4% of the voting age population participated in the Democratic primary.

==== Candidates ====
- Daniel T. McCarty, former State Representative
- J. Brailey Odham, former State Representative
- Alto Adams, former Chief Justice of the Supreme Court of Florida
- Bill Hendrix
- Dale E. Spencer

==== Results ====
Democratic Primary Runoff by county McCarty: 50–60%; 60–70%; 70–80%; Odham: 50–60%; 60–70%

Democratic primary results
Party	Candidate	Votes	%
Democratic	Daniel T. McCarty	361,427	48.94
Democratic	J. Brailey Odham	232,565	31.49
Democratic	Alto Adams	126,426	17.12
Democratic	Bill Hendrix	11,208	1.52
Democratic	Dale E. Spencer	6,871	0.93
Total votes		738,497	100.00

Democratic primary runoff results
Party	Candidate	Votes	%
Democratic	Daniel T. McCarty	384,200	53.29
Democratic	J. Brailey Odham	336,716	46.71
Total votes		720,916	100.00

=== Republican primary ===
1.3% of the voting age population participated in the Republican primary.

==== Candidates ====
- Harry S. Swan, attorney
- Bert L. Acker, former actor, public relations director, unsuccessful candidate for Governor in 1944 and 1948.
- Elmore F. Kitzmiller, dentist

==== Results ====
Republican primary results
Party	Candidate	Votes	%
Republican	Harry S. Swan	11,148	43.00
Republican	Bert L. Acker	9,728	37.52
Republican	Elmore F. Kitzmiller	5,050	19.48
Total votes		25,926	100.00

Republican primary runoff results
Party	Candidate	Votes	%
Republican	Harry S. Swan	10,217	63.02
Republican	Bert L. Acker	5,995	36.98
Total votes		16,212	100.00

== General election ==
=== Candidates ===
- Daniel T. McCarty, Democratic
- Harry S. Swan, Republican

=== Results ===
1952 Florida gubernatorial election
Party	Candidate	Votes	%	±%
Democratic	Daniel T. McCarty	624,463	74.83%	
Republican	Harry S. Swan	210,009	25.17%	
Majority		414,454		
Turnout		834,518		
Democratic hold		Swing		

== Works cited ==
- Steed, Robert; Moreland, Laurence; Baker, Tod, eds. (1980). Party Politics in the South. Praeger Publishers. ISBN 0030565863.
