= Senator Getzen =

Senator Getzen may refer to:

- J. C. Getzen (1904–1970), Florida State Senate
- Samuel W. Getzen (1898–1960), Florida State Senate
