= Senator Matthews =

Senator Mathews or Matthews may refer to:

== Members of the United States Senate ==
- Eric Matthews (Boy Meets World), fictional character from the TV series Boy Meets World, who becomes a U.S. Senator
- Harlan Mathews (1927–2014), U.S. Senator from Tennessee from 1993 to 1994
- Stanley Matthews (judge) (1824–1889), U.S. Senator from Ohio from 1877 to 1879

== United States state senate members ==
- John W. Matthews Jr. (born 1940), South Carolina Senate
- Julius J. Matthews (1826–1916), Iowa State Senate
- Kevin Matthews (politician) (born 1960), Oklahoma State Senate
- Margie Bright Matthews (born 1963), South Carolina State Senate
- A. G. Mathews (1872–1958), West Virginia State Senate
- Andrew Mathews (politician) (fl. 2010s), Minnesota State Senate
- Bernice Mathews (born 1933), Nevada State Senate
- Earl C. Mathews (1879–1953), Virginia State Senate
- James Mathews (American politician) (1805–1887), Ohio State Senate
- John Mathews (judge) (1892–1955), Florida State Senate
- John Mathews Jr. (died 1988), Florida State Senate
- Milton W. Mathews (1846–1892), Illinois State Senate
- Sampson Mathews (1737–1807), Virginia State Senate
- Vincent Mathews (1766–1846), New York State Senate
