= William F. Russell (Florida politician) =

American settler, politician (1805-?)

Member of the Florida House of Representatives from St. Lucia County
- In office 1854–?
- Preceded by: John S. Hermans

9th Speaker of the Florida House of Representatives
- In office November 27, 1854 – January 13, 1855
- Preceded by: Abraham K. Allison
- Succeeded by: Philip Dell

Personal details
- Born: c. 1805 North Carolina, US
- Died: Prob. Orlando, Florida, US
- Occupation: Customs inspector

William F. Russell (c. 1805 – after 1875) was an American politician. He was a settler in Florida, soldier, and member of the Florida House of Representatives, serving as Speaker of the House in 1854. Russell was born in North Carolina. He became a major, and was put in charge of the Indian River Settlement in St. Lucia County, which broke up following an attack by Seminole Indians in July 1849. Russell was shot in the arm during the attack. Russell's brother-in-law John Barker was killed. The rest of his family escaped to New Smyrna.

He served as county commissioner for St. Lucie County from 1847 to 1852 and 1853 until Brevard County was broken off from St. Lucie in 1855.

In 1854, Russell was elected to the Florida House of Representatives and served as Speaker of the Florida House of Representatives.

Russell introduced the legislation creating Brevard County; naming it after his friend Theodorus W. Brevard in 1855.

== Russell-Padrick House ==
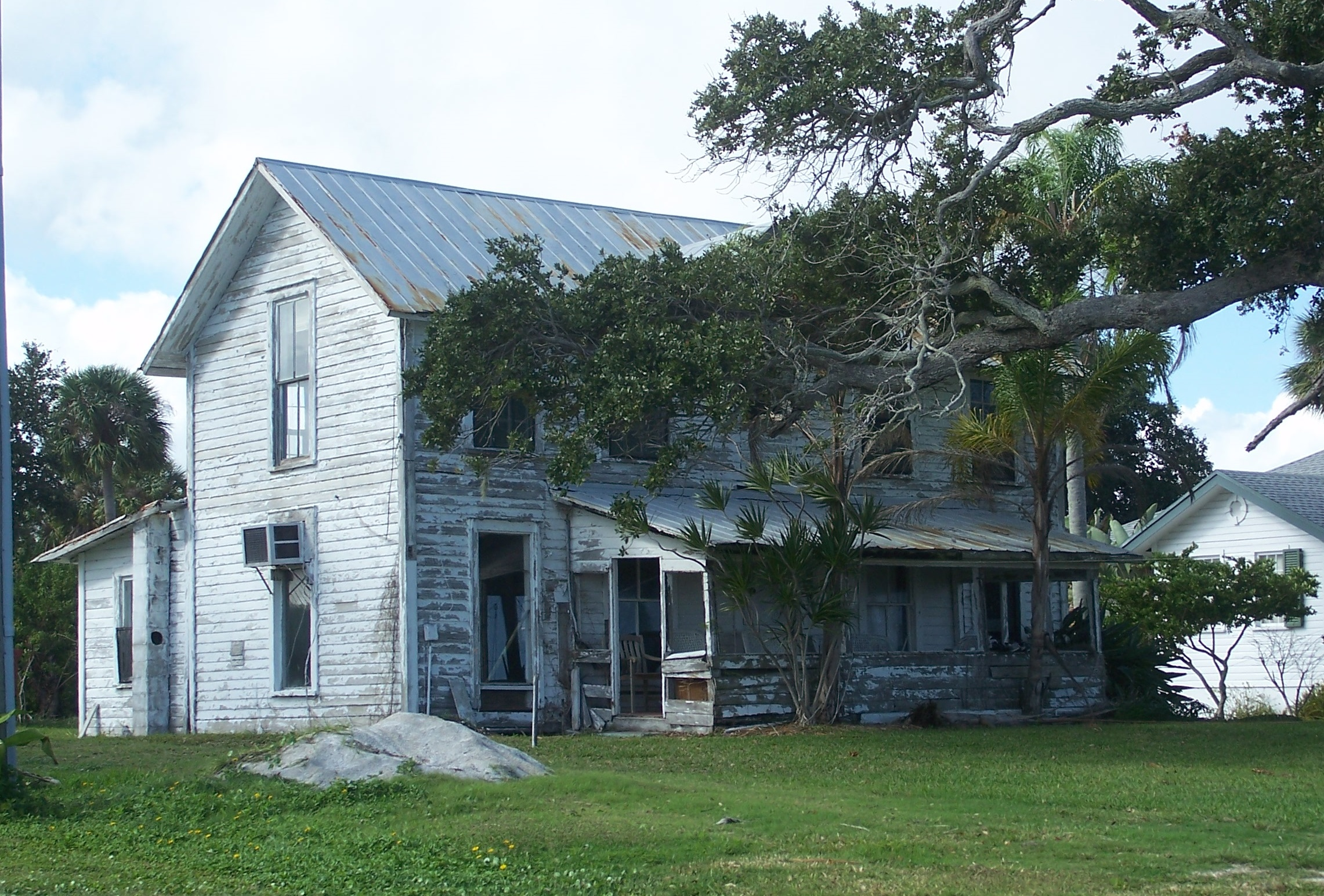
Russell-Padrick House

Around 1875 Russell built a two-story house in St. Lucie County. It is the oldest standing house in the county and is now known as the Russell-Padrick House. It is part of the St. Lucie Village Historic District. It is located at 2817 North Indian River Drive.

== Sources ==
- Cushman, Joseph D. Jr. (July 1964). "The Indian River Settlement: 1842-1849". Florida Historical Quarterly. 43 (1): 21–35. JSTOR i30140071.
- "Major William F. Russell". St. Lucie Historical Society.
- Charles F. Ritter; Jon L. Wakelyn (1 November 1989). "Russell, William F.". American legislative leaders, 1850-1910. Greenwood Press. p. 547. ISBN 978-0-313-23943-4.
