= Thomas Beasley =

Thomas Beasley may refer to:

- Thomas D. Beasley (1904–1988), Florida politician
- Thomas W. Beasley (born 1943), Tennessee politician and businessman
- Tom Beasley (born 1954), American football player
