= Senator Dayton (disambiguation) =

Mark Dayton (born 1947) was a U.S. Senator from Minnesota from 2001 to 2007. Senator Dayton may also refer to:

== United States Senate members ==
- Jonathan Dayton (1760–1824), U.S. Senator from New Jersey from 1799 to 1805
- William L. Dayton (1807–1864), U.S. Senator from New Jersey

== United States state senate members ==
- George Dayton (politician) (1827–1902), New Jersey State Senate
- George C. Dayton (1911–1993), Florida State Senate
- Jesse C. Dayton (1825–1903), New York State Senate
- Margaret Dayton (born 1949), Utah State Senate
