= Attorney General Galbraith =

Attorney General Galbraith may refer to:

- John B. Galbraith (1828–1869), Attorney General of Florida
- W. J. Galbraith (1883–1956), Attorney General of Arizona
