= George Wilder =

George Wilder may refer to:

- George Wilder (cricketer) (1876–1948), English cricketer
- George Wilder (criminal), New Zealand prison escaper and folk hero
- George H. Wilder, former speaker of the Florida House of Representatives
- George Wilder Mitchell (1904–1997), American economist
