= Bernie Papy Jr. =

American politician

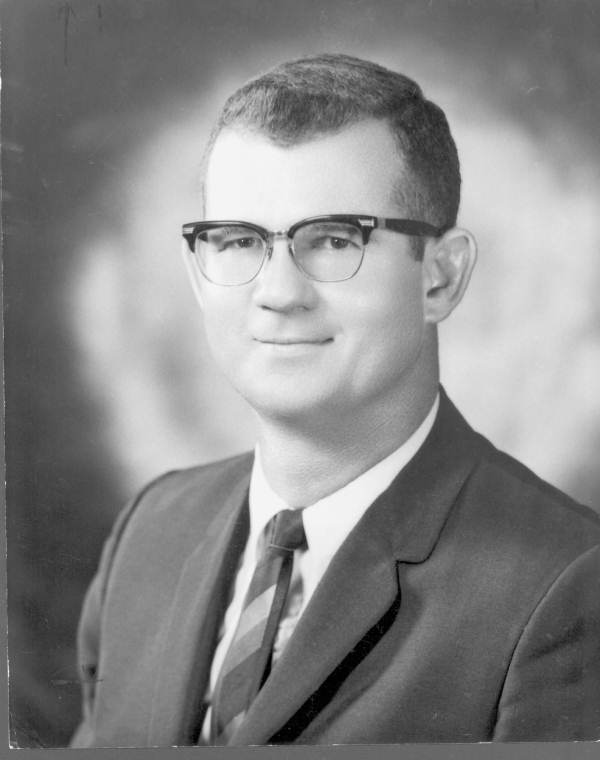

Member of the Florida House of Representatives from the 114th district
- In office 1965–1968

Personal details
- Born: February 14, 1930 Key West, Florida, U.S.
- Died: April 29, 1995 (aged 65) Monroe County, Florida, U.S.
- Party: Democratic
- Relations: Bernie Papy (father)
- Education: University of Florida
- Occupation: gasoline distributor, insurance agent, bank director

Bernie Clayton Papy Jr. (February 14, 1930 – April 29, 1995) was a politician in the American state of Florida. He served in the Florida House of Representatives from 1965 to 1968, representing the 114th district. His father Bernie Papy was a long-serving member of the Florida House of Representatives for Key West.

Papy Jr introduced legislation calling for a $100 fine to be levied against anyone advertising Key lime pie that is not made with Key limes. The legislation was shot down, however.

== See also ==
- Mariano D. Papy
