= Eugene Matthews =

Eugene Matthews may refer to:

- Eugene Matthews (bishop), Roman Catholic bishop and archbishop
- Eugene S. Matthews, Florida politician and newspaperman
