= John Galbraith =

John Galbraith may refer to:

- John Kenneth Galbraith (1908–2006), Canadian-American economist
- John Galbraith (Pennsylvania politician) (1794–1860), Pennsylvania politician
- Jack Galbraith (1898–?), Scottish footballer
- John Galbraith Graham (1921–2013), British crossword compiler
- John Semple Galbraith (1916–2003), British historian and former Chancellor of the University of California
- John Galbraith (Ohio politician) (1923–2021), American politician, member of the Ohio House of Representatives
- John B. Galbraith (1828–1869), American politician from Florida
