= Eugene S. Matthews =

American politician

Eugene Simeon Matthews
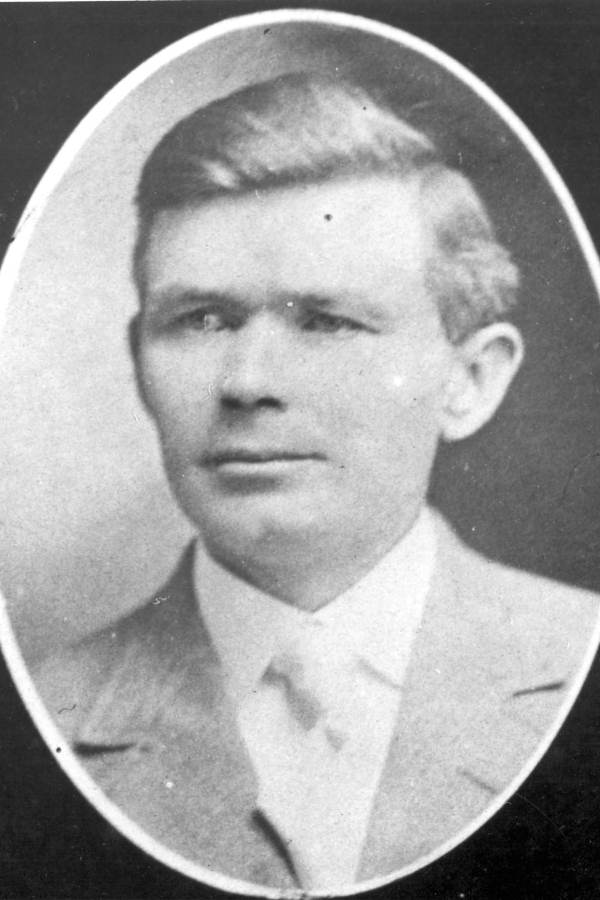

Speaker of the Florida House of Representatives
- In office 1907–1907
- Preceded by: Albert W. Gilchrist
- Succeeded by: Ion Farris

Personal details
- Born: July 9, 1872 Fort Call, Bradford County, Florida, U.S.
- Died: July 13, 1954 (aged 82)
- Party: Democratic
- Occupation: Politician, newspaperman

Eugene Simeon Matthews (July 9, 1872 – July 13, 1954) was a Florida politician and newspaperman. He served in the Florida House of Representatives and owned and edited the Bradford County Telegraph for forty years.

== Early life ==
Matthews was born in Fort Call in Bradford County, Florida, the son of Florida natives W.W. and Ella Liddon Matthews. His father served as a first lieutenant in the Confederate States Army and spent eighteen months as a prisoner at Rock Island Arsenal after being captured at the Battle of Chickamauga. Matthews attended school in Bradford County and Gainesville, Florida and trained in the newspaper business starting at age eleven.

== Newspaper owner in boomtown Dunellon ==
In 1888, Matthews edited and published the Lake Weir Independent. In 1891, following the discovery of phosphate in Dunnellon, Florida and the subsequent mining boom, Matthews founded the Dunnellon News and served as town clerk. After writing about poor treatment of convicts leased to work in phosphate mines, the resulting pressure and threats from mine owners led Matthews to sell the News and move to Ocala, Florida for work with the Daily Capitol.

== Move to Starke and entry into politics ==
In January 1893, Matthews moved to Starke, Florida. With Ben J. Farmer, Matthews purchased the Bradford County Telegraph, a newspaper founded in 1879 by William Wyatt Moore. After five years, Farmer sold his interest to Matthews, who edited the Telegraph for forty years. Starting in 1933, his son, Eugene L. Matthews, edited the newspaper for another forty years until retiring and selling the newspaper in 1973. The newspaper is still published today.

Matthews was Alderman of Starke from 1897 to 1898. From 1897 to 1898, he was Captain of the Bradford County Guards, which served as Company M of the 1st Florida Volunteer Infantry during the Spanish–American War, but the regiment ventured no further from Florida than Alabama. In 1899, he was promoted to Major and commanded the 2nd battalion of the 2nd Regiment of the Florida State Troops.

== Election to the state legislature ==
Matthews was elected to the Florida State Legislature in 1904, 1907, 1911 and 1923 and served as Speaker of the Florida House of Representatives in 1907. Governor Cary A. Hardee appointed Matthews to the Florida Railroad Commission, where he served from 1924 to 1946. His son credits Matthews with bringing the route of State Road 13 (now U.S. Route 301 and State Road 200) from Tampa, Florida to Jacksonville, Florida through Starke, creating an economic boom there.
