= Samuel Love =

Samuel Love may refer to:

- Samuel G. Love (1821–1893), American teacher and educationist
- Samuel B. Love, politician in the Florida House of Representatives
