= Evans Crary =

American politician

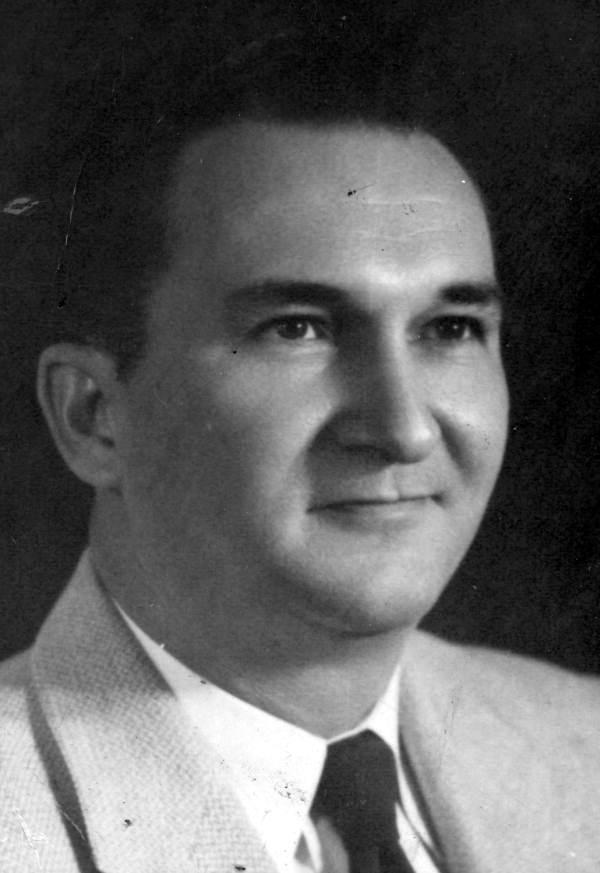
- Crary in 1947

Member of the Florida House of Representatives from Martin County
- In office 1937–1947

Speaker of the Florida House of Representatives
- In office 1945–1947
- Preceded by: Richard H. Simpson
- Succeeded by: Thomas D. Beasley

Member of the Florida Senate from the 12th district
- In office 1947–1953
- Preceded by: K. Griner
- Succeeded by: Merrill P. Barber

Personal details
- Born: June 25, 1905
- Died: April 16, 1968 (aged 62)
- Party: Democratic

Evans Crary (June 25, 1905 – April 16, 1968) was an American politician. A Democrat, he served in the Florida House of Representatives. He also served as a member of the Florida Senate representing the 12th District.
