= Attorney General Archer =

Attorney General Archer may refer to:

- James T. Archer (1819–1859), Attorney General of Florida
- Peter Archer, Baron Archer of Sandwell (1926–2012), Shadow Attorney General for England and Wales

== See also ==
- General Archer (disambiguation)
