= Governor Warren =

Governor Warren may refer to:

- Earl Warren (1891–1974), 30th Governor of California
- Francis E. Warren (1844–1929), 1st Governor of Wyoming
- Fuller Warren (1905–1973), 30th Governor of Florida
- Gouverneur K. Warren (1830-1882), General in the American Civil War
