= W. B. Bishop =

American politician (1890–1954)

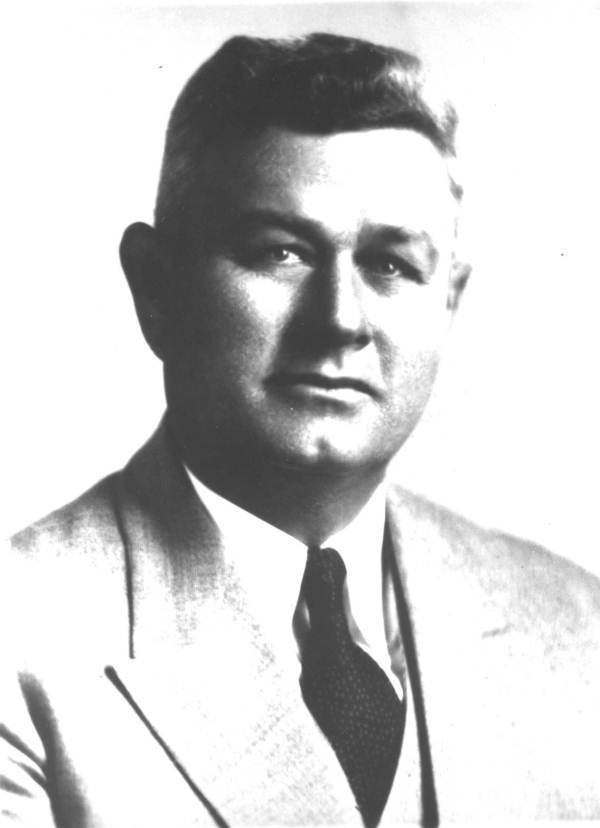
- Bishop in 1935

Member of the Florida House of Representatives from Jefferson County
- In office 1921–1927
- In office 1933–1937

Speaker of the Florida House of Representatives
- In office 1935–1937
- Preceded by: Peter Tomasello Jr.
- Succeeded by: William McLean Christie

Personal details
- Born: November 3, 1890 Jefferson County, Florida, U.S.
- Died: April 17, 1954 (aged 63)
- Party: Democratic

W. B. Bishop (November 3, 1890 – April 17, 1954) was an American politician. He served as a Democratic member of the Florida House of Representatives.

== Life and career ==
Bishop was born in Jefferson County, Florida.

Bishop served in the Florida House of Representatives from 1921 to 1927 and again from 1933 to 1937.

Bishop died on April 17, 1954 in an automobile accident, at the age of 63.
