= Arthur Lafayette Bryant =

American politician

Member of the Florida House of Representatives from Pasco County
- In office 1943

Member of the Florida Senate from the 38th district
- In office 1945
- Preceded by: W. H. Brewton
- Succeeded by: J. C. Getzen

Personal details
- Born: September 10, 1888
- Died: July 14, 1965 (aged 76)
- Party: Democratic

Arthur Lafayette Bryant (September 10, 1888 – July 14, 1965) was an American politician. He served as a Democratic member of the Florida House of Representatives. He also served as a member for the 38th district of the Florida Senate.
