= John E. Mathews =

American judge (1892–1955)

John Mathews
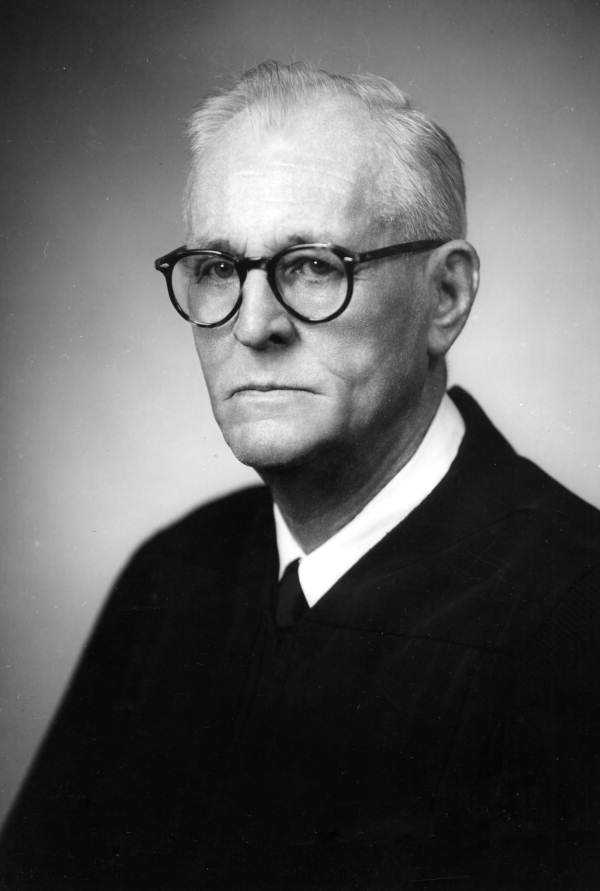
- Mathews in 1951

Chief Justice of the Florida Supreme Court
- In office January 1955 – April 29, 1955

Justice of the Florida Supreme Court
- In office October 23, 1951 – April 29, 1955
- Appointed by: Fuller Warren
- Preceded by: Alto Adams
- Succeeded by: B. Campbell Thornal

Member of the Florida Senate from the 18th district
- In office April 6, 1943 – April 3, 1951
- Preceded by: J. Turner Butler
- Succeeded by: Wayne E. Ripley

Personal details
- Born: July 19, 1892 Jacksonville, Florida.
- Died: April 29, 1955 (aged 62) Tallahassee, Florida, U.S.

John Elie Mathews (July 19, 1892 – April 29, 1955) was an American lawyer, legislator, and judge. He was a justice of the Florida Supreme Court from 1951 to 1955. He supported segregation. His son John Mathews Jr. also became a lawyer, served in the Florida Legislature, and campaigned to be governor of Florida.

Mathews was born on July 19, 1892, in Tattnall County, Georgia. Mathews began his legal career in Georgia in 1913 before moving to Jacksonville, Florida and opening a practice in 1916. He married Alice Schumpert. His son, future Florida legislator John Mathews Jr., was born in 1920.

He served in the Florida House of Representatives from 1928 to 1932. In 1942, Mathews was elected to the Florida Senate. In 1945, he was a part of the movement to re-apportion the legislature to reflect the growing population in the state's cities. Mathews led an unsuccessful campaign to exclude blacks from the Democratic primary election in 1947. He was also an opponent of desegregation of the University of Florida during his time in the Senate. In 1950, Mathews was defeated in a re-election campaign, partially through the mobilization of black voters.

In 1951, Justice Alto Adams resigned from the Florida Supreme Court to run for governor. Mathews was chosen as his replacement by political ally Governor Fuller Warren, and he joined the Court on October 23, 1951. As a justice, Mathews spearheaded the creation of the District Courts of Appeal to reduce the workload of the Supreme Court. He spoke out against the Brown v. Board of Education ruling that integrated the nation's schools. Mathews' health had already begun to fail when he became the Chief Justice in January 1955. He died of a heart attack on April 29, 1955, in Tallahassee, Florida. The Mathews Bridge in Jacksonville is named in honor of him.
