= General Archer =

General Archer may refer to:

- James J. Archer (1817–1864), Confederate States Army brigadier general
- John Archer (British Army officer) (1924–1999), British Army general

== See also ==
- Attorney General Archer (disambiguation)
