= Jesse M. Mitchell =

American politician

Member of the Florida Senate from the 9th district
- In office 1923
- Preceded by: E. P. Wilson
- Succeeded by: Hugh Hale

Member of the Florida Senate from the 38th district
- In office 1927–1931
- Preceded by: District established
- Succeeded by: Samuel W. Getzen

Personal details
- Born: May 23, 1869
- Died: January 12, 1935 (aged 65) Tampa, Florida, U.S.
- Party: Democratic

Jesse M. Mitchell (May 23, 1869 – January 12, 1935), also known as J. M. Mitchell, was an American politician. He served as a Democratic Party member for the 9th and 38th district of the Florida Senate.

Mitchell died on January 12, 1935 in Tampa, Florida, at the age of 65.
