= Florida's 38th Senate district =

American legislative district

Florida's 38th State Senate district
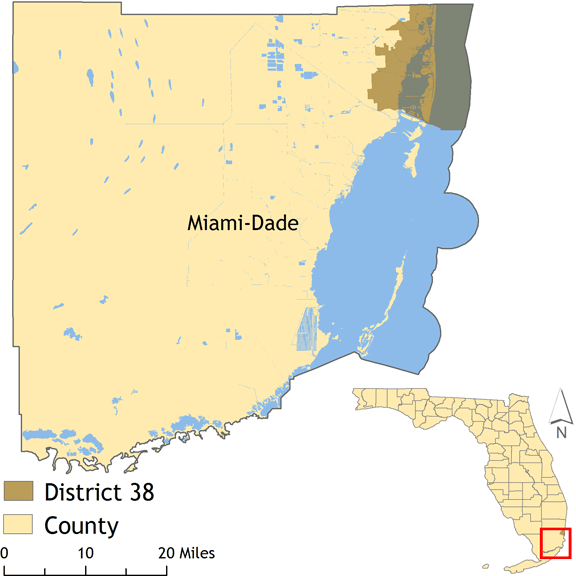
Senator
Alexis Calatayud; R–Miami
- Demographics: 34.9% White; 26.7% Black; 43.5% Hispanic; 1.8% Asian; 0.4% Native American; 0.0% Hawaiian/Pacific Islander; 2.9% Other; 3.5% Multiracial
- Population (2022): 488,200

Florida's 38th Senate district elects one member of the Florida Senate. The district consists of part of Miami-Dade county. Its current senator is Alexis Calatayud.

== Election results ==
2018 Primary Election
Party	Candidate	Votes	%
Democratic	Jason Pizzo	26,907	54.1
Democratic	Daphne Campbell	22,837	45.9
Total votes		49,744	100%

2016 Primary Election
Party	Candidate	Votes	%
Democratic	Daphne Campbell	9,017	31.01
Democratic	Jason Pizzo	6,888	23.69
Democratic	Michael Gongora	6,243	21.47
Democratic	Kevin A. Burns	4,437	15.26
Democratic	Anis Blemur	1,529	5.26
Democratic	Don Festge	964	3.32
Total votes		29,078	100%

2010 General Election
Party	Candidate	Votes	%
Republican	Anitere Flores	65,133	68.2
Democratic	Les Gerson	30,409	31.8
Total votes		95,542	100%

2010 Republican Primary
Party	Candidate	Votes	%
Republican	Anitere Flores	20,752	81.2
Republican	David Nelson	4,810	18.8
Total votes		25,562	100%

2006 Primary Election
Party	Candidate	Votes	%
Republican	Alex Villalobos	11,239	51.0
Republican	Frank Bolanos	10,810	49.0
Total votes		22,049	100%

== Senators from 1927 – Present ==
Senator	Party	Years of service	Hometown	Notes
Jesse M. Mitchell	Democrat	1927 – 1931	Elfers	
Samuel W. Getzen	Democrat	1931 – 1935	Bushnell	
Fred L. Touchton	Democrat	1935 – 1939	Dade City	
John W. Gideons	Democrat	1939 – 1943	Webster	
W. H. Brewton	Democrat	1943 – 1945	Dade City	
Arthur Lafayette Bryant	Democrat	1945 – 1947	Dade City	
J. C. Getzen	Democrat	1947 – 1949	Bushnell	
George C. Dayton	Democrat	1950 – 1955	Dade City	Elected in 1950
J. C. Getzen	Democrat	1955 – 1962	Bushnell	
DeCarr Covington	Democrat	1962 – 1965	Dade City	
Richard Deeb	Republican	1966 – 1967		
John Bell	Republican	1967 – November 7, 1972	Fort Lauderdale	
Ralph Poston	Democrat	November 7, 1972 – November 7, 1978		
Robert W. McKnight	Democrat	November 7, 1978 – November 2, 1982		
Franklin B. Mann	Democrat	November 2, 1982 – November 4, 1986		
Fred Dudley	Republican	November 4, 1986 – November 3, 1992		
Ron Silver	Democrat	November 3, 1992 – November 5, 2002		
J. Alex Villalobos	Republican	November 5, 2002 – November 2, 2010		
Anitere Flores	Republican	November 2, 2010 – November 20, 2012		
René García	Republican	November 20, 2012 – November 8, 2016		
Daphne Campbell	Democratic	November 8, 2016 – November 6, 2018		
Jason Pizzo	Democratic	November 6, 2018 – November 8, 2022	North Miami Beach	
Alexis Calatayud	Republican	November 8, 2022 – Present	Miami	
