= Theodorus W. Brevard =

American politician

Florida Comptroller
- In office April 3, 1851 – November 27, 1854
- Preceded by: John Beard
- Succeeded by: James T. Archer
- In office January 24, 1855 – December 14, 1860
- Preceded by: James T. Archer
- Succeeded by: Robert C. Williams

Personal details
- Born: September 24, 1804 North Carolina, U.S.
- Died: 1877 Lincolnton, North Carolina, U.S.
- Spouse: Caroline Elizabeth Mays
- Children: Theodore W. Brevard, Jr., Ephraim, Sam, Robert
- Occupation: lawyer, judge

Theodorus Washington Brevard (September 24, 1804 – 1877) was a Florida settler who served as Florida Comptroller for nearly ten years from April 3, 1851, to November 27, 1854, and from January 24, 1855, to December 14, 1860. He is the namesake of Brevard County, Florida. He was born in North Carolina in 1804.

He was the son of Alexander Brevard (b. 1755), an officer in the Continental Army, and Rebecca Davidson. He married Caroline Elizabeth Mays and was the father of Theodore W. Brevard, Jr.

He settled in Tallahassee, Florida in 1847.
