= Bernie Papy =

American politician (1902–1964)

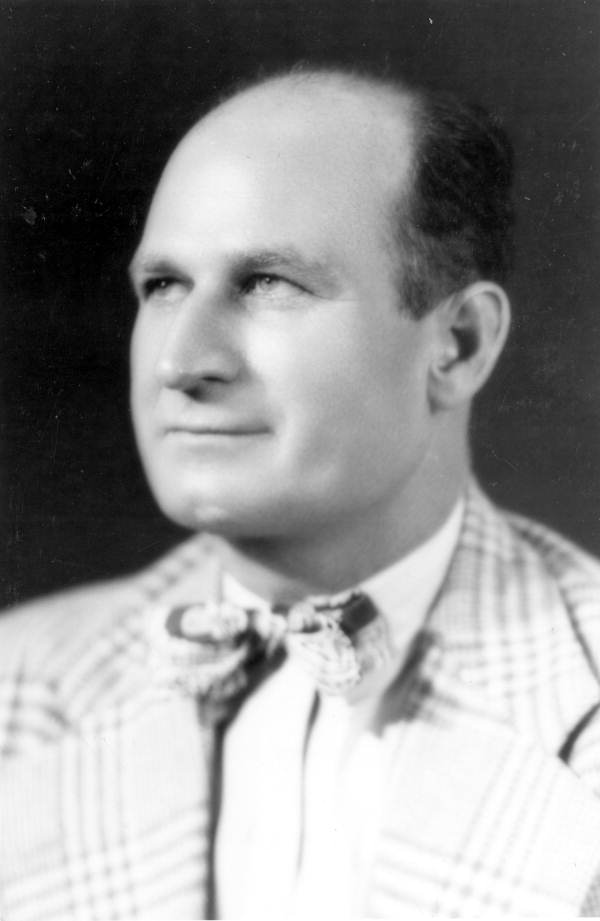
- Papy c. 1947

Member of the Florida House of Representatives
- In office 1935–1962

Personal details
- Born: Bernie Clayton Papy; May 27, 1902
- Died: August 10, 1964 (aged 62) Miami, Florida, U.S.
- Occupation: Politician

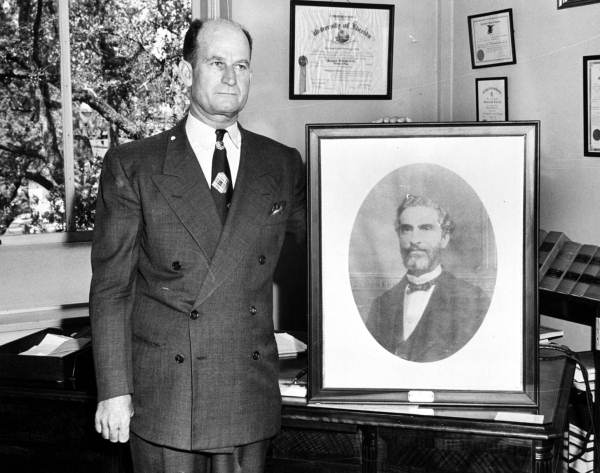
Bernie C. Papy standing with a portrait of Mariano D. Papy

Bernie Clayton Papy Sr. (May 27, 1902 – August 10, 1964) was an American politician from Key West, Florida. He served in the Florida House of Representatives from 1935 until 1962, representing Key West. Papy ran for office again in 1964, winning the primaries, but died in a Miami hospital following lung cancer surgery before contesting the general elections. Bernie Papy Jr. was his son.

== See also ==
- Mariano D. Papy
