= E. Clay Lewis Jr. =

American politician

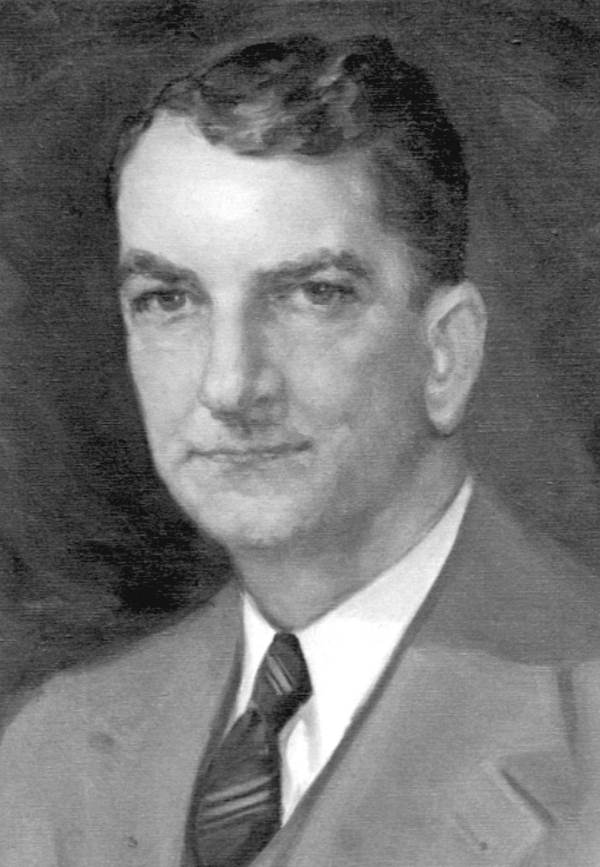
- Lewis in 1931

Member of the Florida House of Representatives from Gulf County
- In office 1927–1933
- In office 1939–1943

Speaker of the Florida House of Representatives
- In office 1931–1933
- Preceded by: Samuel W. Getzen
- Succeeded by: Peter Tomasello Jr.

Personal details
- Born: September 18, 1901 Marianna, Florida, U.S.
- Died: April 27, 1961 (aged 59)
- Party: Democratic
- Education: University of Florida

E. Clay Lewis Jr. (September 18, 1901 – April 27, 1961), also known as Edward Clay Lewis Jr., was an American politician. He served as a Democratic member of the Florida House of Representatives.

== Life and career ==
Lewis was born in Marianna, Florida. He attended the University of Florida.

Lewis served in the Florida House of Representatives from 1927 to 1933 and again from 1939 to 1943.

Lewis died on April 27, 1961, at the age of 59.
