= J. C. Getzen =

American politician

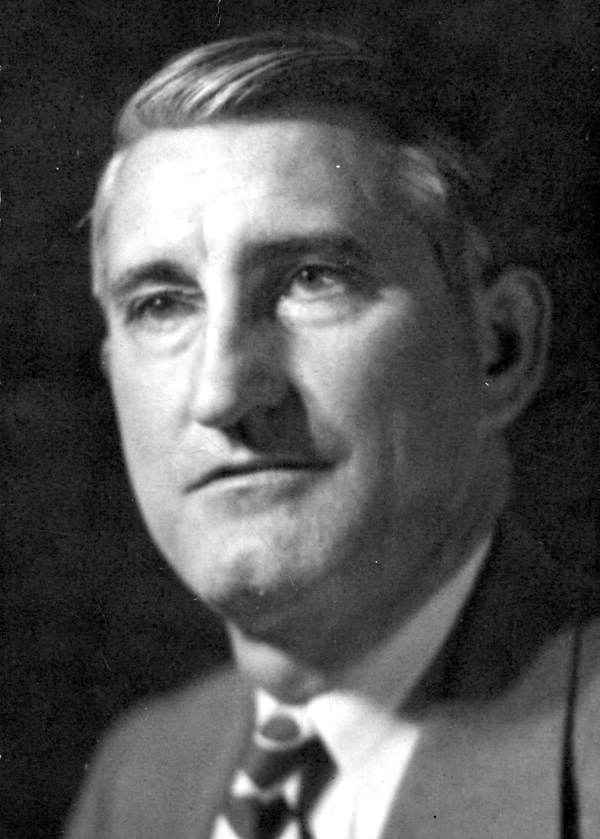

Member of the Florida Senate from the 38th district
- In office 1955–1961
- Preceded by: George C. Dayton
- Succeeded by: DeCarr Covington
- In office 1947–1949
- Preceded by: Arthur Lafayette Bryant
- Succeeded by: George C. Dayton

Member of the Florida House of Representatives from the Sumter district
- In office 1937–1945
- Preceded by: Samuel W. Getzen
- Succeeded by: C. M. Brown
- In office 1951–1955
- Preceded by: John V Monahan
- Succeeded by: Evan A. Billy Merritt Jr.

Personal details
- Born: James Culbreath Getzen Jr. March 8, 1904 Florida, U.S.
- Died: April 19, 1970 (aged 66) Marion County, Florida, U.S.
- Party: Democratic
- Spouse: Wilma V. Getzen

James Culbreath Getzen Jr. (March 8, 1904 – April 19, 1970) was an American politician in the state of Florida.

He served in the Florida State Senate from 1947 to 1949 and 1955 to 1961 as a Democratic member for the 38th district. He also served in the Florida House of Representatives, from 1937 to 1949, and 1951 to 1955 for Sumter County. He was a member of the Pork Chop Gang, a group of legislators from rural areas that dominated the state legislature due to malapportionment and used their power to engage in McCarthyist tactics.
