= Florida Comptroller =

U.S. state office position

The Florida comptroller was the state comptroller of Florida from 1845 to 2003 (when the position was merged with the position of Florida State Treasurer/Insurance Commissioner/Fire Marshal to create the post of Chief Financial Officer of Florida following amendments to the State Constitution). The comptroller was a member of the Florida Cabinet and was elected by the Florida Legislature until 1865, when it became an elected office.

The comptroller was Florida's chief fiscal officer. The post was created in the 1838 Constitution and the first comptroller took office in 1845 and assumed the duties of the Auditor of Public Accounts of Florida Territory.

The comptroller initially was in charge of the Comptroller's Office, whose duties where transferred to the Department of Banking and Finance in 1969 (the comptroller served as the head of the department).

== List of comptrollers ==
Comptrollers by party affiliation
| Party | Comptrollers |
|---|---|
| Democratic | 22 |
| Whig | 3 |
| Republican | 2 |

| # | Image | Name | Term of service | Political party |
|---|---|---|---|---|
| 1 | | Nathaniel P. Bemis | 1845 | Democratic |
| 2 | | Hugh Archer | 1845–1847 | Whig |
| 3 | | Nathaniel P. Bemis | 1847 | Democratic |
| 4 | | Hugh Archer | 1847 | Whig |
| 5 | | Simon Towle | 1847–1851 | Whig |
| 6 | | John Beard | 1851–1854 | Democratic |
| 7 | | Theodorus W. Brevard | 1854 | Democratic |
| 8 | | James T. Archer | 1854–1855 | Democratic |
| 9 | | Theodorus W. Brevard | 1855–1860 | Democratic |
| 10 | | Robert C. Williams | 1860–1863 | Democratic |
| 11 | | Walter Gwynn | 1863–1866 | Democratic |
| 12 | | John Beard | 1866–1868 | Democratic |
| 13 | | Robert H. Gamble | 1868–1873 | Democratic |
| 14 | | Clayton Cowgill | 1873–1877 | Republican |
| 15 | | Columbus Drew | 1877–1881 | Democratic |
| 16 | | William D. Barnes | 1881–1890 | Democratic |
| 17 | | William D. Bloxham | 1890–1897 | Democratic |
| 18 | | William H. Reynolds | 1897–1901 | Democratic |
| 19 | | A. C. Croom | 1901–1912 | Democratic |
| 20 | | William V. Knott | 1912–1917 | Democratic |
| 21 | | Ernest Amos | 1917–1933 | Democratic |
| 22 | | J. M. Lee | 1933–1946 | Democratic |
| 23 | | Clarence M. Gay | 1946–1955 | Democratic |
| 24 | | Ray E. Green | 1955–1965 | Democratic |
| 25 | | Fred Otis Dickinson | 1965–1975 | Democratic |
| 26 | | Gerald Lewis | 1975–1995 | Democratic |
| 27 | | Bob Milligan | 1995–2003 | Republican |
