= K. Griner =

American politician

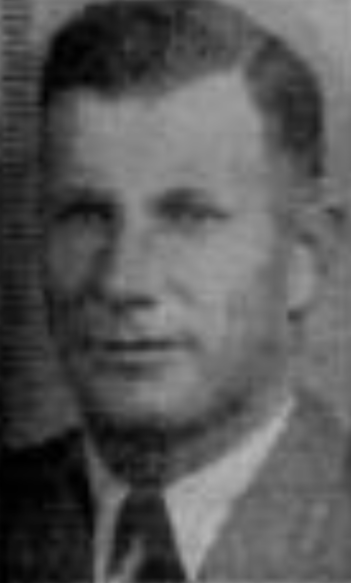
- Griner in 1939

Member of the Florida House of Representatives from Dixie County
- In office 1951–1954
- Succeeded by: Hal Chaires
- In office 1939

Member of the Florida Senate from the 12th district
- In office 1943–1945
- Preceded by: F. P. Parker
- Succeeded by: Evans Crary

Personal details
- Born: Kerfoot Moses Griner; January 12, 1899 Mitchell County, Georgia, U.S.
- Died: January 18, 1963 (aged 64) Lowndes County, Georgia, U.S.
- Resting place: Cross City Cemetery, Cross City, Florida
- Party: Democratic
- Spouse: Mamie Smith
- Children: two

Kerfoot Moses Griner (January 12, 1899 – January 18, 1963), known as K. Griner, was an American politician in the state of Florida. He served in the Florida House of Representatives in 1939 and again from 1951 to 1954, as a Democrat, representing Dixie County. He also served in the Florida Senate from 1943 to 1945.
