= David P. Hogue =

American politician

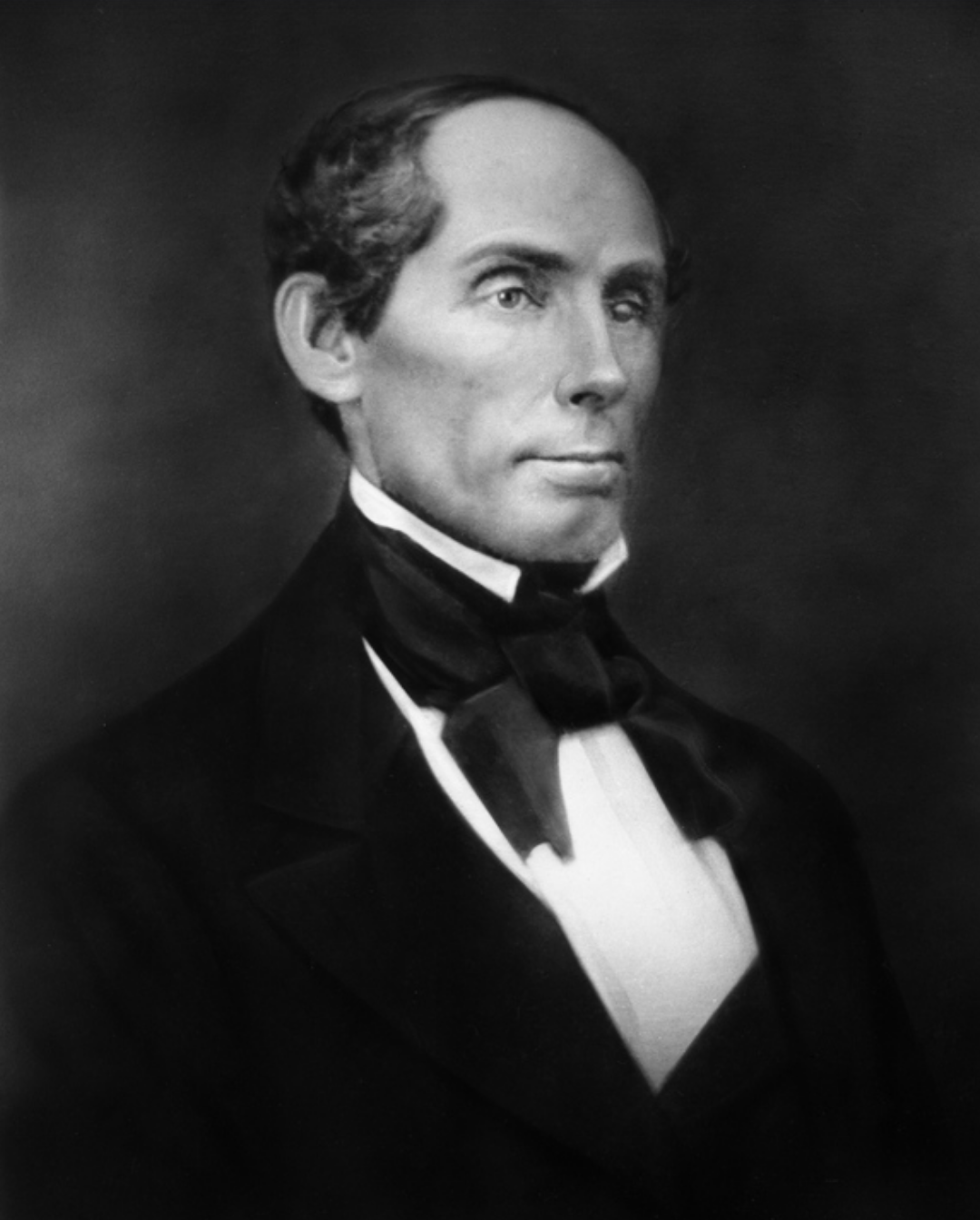

20th, 25th, and 28th Mayor of Tallahassee
- In office 1867–1868
- Preceded by: Francis W. Eppes
- Succeeded by: Thaddeus Preston Tatum
- In office 1858–1860
- Preceded by: Francis W. Eppes
- Succeeded by: P. T. Pearce
- In office 1850–1851
- Preceded by: Thomas J. Perkins
- Succeeded by: David S. Walker

Member of the Florida Senate from the 8th district
- In office 1862–1864

4th Florida Attorney General
- In office October 14, 1848 – October 3, 1853
- Governor: William Dunn Moseley; Thomas Brown
- Preceded by: James T. Archer
- Succeeded by: Mariano D. Papy

Personal details
- Born: March 12, 1815 Erie, Pennsylvania, U.S.
- Died: November 19, 1871 (aged 56) Tallahassee, Florida, U.S.
- Party: Whig
- Spouse: Ester Lane Dennis Savage (m. 1838)
- Children: 2
- Occupation: Reporter

David Porter Hogue (March 12, 1815 – November 19, 1871), also known as D. P. Hogue, was an American reporter and politician from the state of Florida. Hogue served as the 4th Florida Attorney General from 1848 until 1853. He also served various terms as Mayor of Tallahassee.

== Early life ==
Hogue was born in Erie, Pennsylvania on March 12, 1815, though his family moved to Maryland and then Virginia when he was young. In 1838, Hogue moved to the Florida Territory, settling in Tallahassee. At some point after this, Hogue was admitted into the Florida Bar.

== Political career ==
In October 1848, Hogue was appointed Florida Attorney General upon the resignation of incumbent James T. Archer. In 1850, while still serving as Attorney General, Hogue was elected to be the 20th Mayor of Tallahassee. He was also a reporter for the Florida Supreme Court. Hogue served out his term as Attorney General in 1853 and did not seek re-election. He also resigned from his mayoral position a couple of years prior in 1851.

In 1858, Hogue was once again elected Mayor of Tallahassee. He served until 1860.

During the American Civil War, Hogue, a Southern Whig, served in the Florida Senate, representing the 8th district from 1862 until 1864. Hogue strongly opposed secession and the war, advising Governor John Milton against further mobilization and to oppose the expansion of the Florida Railroad Company. After the war, Hogue was a delegate to the Florida Constitutional Convention of 1865. While there, he helped repeal Florida's Ordinance of Secession and signed the Florida Constitution of 1865, which was not approved by the U.S. Congress, since it only gave voting rights to free white male citizens. He was again elected Mayor of Tallahassee soon after, serving from 1867 until 1868.

== Death and burial ==
Hogue died of heart disease on November 19, 1871. The night before he died, he was attending a late-night trial at the local circuit court.

Hogue is buried in the Saint Johns Episcopal Church Cemetery in Tallahassee.

== See also ==
- List of mayors of Tallahassee, Florida
