= 1948 Florida gubernatorial election =

- November 2, 1948
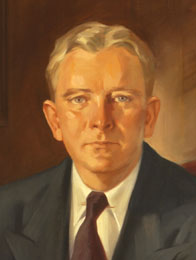

Nominee	Fuller Warren	Bert L. Acker
Party	Democratic	Republican
Popular vote	381,459	76,153
Percentage	83.35%	16.64%
- County results Warren: 60–70% 70–80% 80–90% >90%
Governor before election
Millard Caldwell
Democratic
Elected Governor
Fuller Warren
Democratic

The 1948 Florida gubernatorial election was held on November 2, 1948. Democratic nominee Fuller Warren defeated Republican nominee Bert L. Acker with 83.35% of the vote.

== Primary elections ==
Primary elections were held on May 4, 1948.

=== Democratic primary ===
==== Candidates ====
- Fuller Warren, former State Representative
- Daniel T. McCarty, former State Representative
- Colin English, Florida Superintendent of Public Instruction
- William A. Shands, State Senator
- J. Thomas Watson, Florida Attorney General
- Richard H. Cooper
- Bernarr Macfadden
- F. D. Akin
- Basil H. Pollitt

==== Results ====
Democratic Primary Runoff by county Warren: 50–60%; 60–70%; 70–80%; 80–90%; McCarty: 50–60%; 60–70%; 70–80%; 80–90%

Democratic primary results
Party	Candidate	Votes	%
Democratic	Fuller Warren	183,326	32.45
Democratic	Daniel T. McCarty	161,788	28.64
Democratic	Colin English	89,158	15.78
Democratic	William A. Shands	62,358	11.04
Democratic	J. Thomas Watson	51,505	9.12
Democratic	Richard H. Cooper	8,152	1.44
Democratic	Bernarr Macfadden	4,540	0.80
Democratic	F. D. Akin	2,792	0.49
Democratic	Basil H. Pollitt	1,261	0.22
Total votes		564,880	100.00

Democratic primary runoff results
Party	Candidate	Votes	%
Democratic	Fuller Warren	299,641	52.02
Democratic	Daniel T. McCarty	276,425	47.99
Total votes		576,066	100.00

=== Republican primary ===
==== Candidates ====
- Bert L. Acker
- John L. Cogdill

==== Results ====
Republican primary results
Party	Candidate	Votes	%
Republican	Bert L. Acker	10,807	64.00
Republican	John L. Cogdill	6,079	36.00
Total votes		16,886	100.00

== General election ==
=== Candidates ===
- Fuller Warren, Democratic
- Bert L. Acker, Republican

=== Results ===
1948 Florida gubernatorial election
Party	Candidate	Votes	%	±%
Democratic	Fuller Warren	381,459	83.35%	
Republican	Bert L. Acker	76,153	16.64%	
Majority		305,306		
Turnout		457,638		
Democratic hold		Swing		
