= John W. Gideons =

American politician

Member of the Florida Senate from the 38th district
- In office 1939–1941
- Preceded by: Fred L. Touchton
- Succeeded by: W. H. Brewton

Personal details
- Party: Democratic

John W. Gideons was an American politician. He served as a Democratic member for the 38th district of the Florida Senate.
