= James T. Archer =

American lawyer and politician (1819–1859)

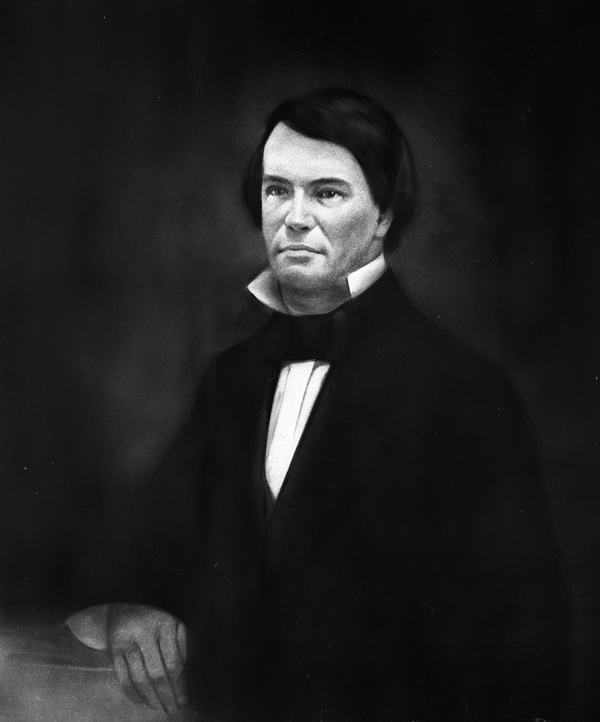

5th Florida Comptroller
- In office November 27, 1854 – January 24, 1855
- Governor: James E. Broome
- Preceded by: Theodore W. Brevard
- Succeeded by: Theodore W. Brevard

3rd Florida Attorney General
- In office April 11, 1848 – October 14, 1848
- Governor: William Dunn Moseley
- Preceded by: Augustus Maxwell
- Succeeded by: David P. Hogue

1st Secretary of State of Florida
- In office July 23, 1845 – April 11, 1848
- Governor: William Dunn Moseley
- Preceded by: Office created
- Succeeded by: Augustus Maxwell

U.S. Attorney for the Western District of Florida
- In office 1840–1840

Personal details
- Born: May 15, 1819; Gillisonville, South Carolina, U.S.
- Died: June 1, 1859; Tallahassee, Florida, U.S.
- Political party: Democratic
- Spouse: Mary Brown Archer
- Occupation: Lawyer

James Tillinghast Archer (May 15, 1819 – June 1, 1859) was an American lawyer and politician from the state of Florida. Archer held a number of statewide offices.

== Early life ==
Archer was born on May 15, 1819, in Gillisonville, South Carolina. His family moved to Leon County in the Florida Territory in the 1830s as a result of his father, Hugh Archer, taking a position on the Florida Territorial Legislative Council. Archer was thus raised into Florida politics from an early age.

== Political career ==
In 1840, Archer was named U.S. Attorney for the Western District of Florida, though he would only hold the position for that year. A Democrat, he was named the first Florida Secretary of State when Florida gained its statehood in 1845. He served in this position until April 1848, when he was appointed as the third Florida Attorney General upon the resignation of incumbent Augustus Maxwell.

During his tenure, Archer was selected to be a member of the first Democratic National Committee at the 1848 Democratic National Convention. He would serve as Attorney General until his resignation in October 1848.

After his resignation, Archer began a private law practice in Tallahassee, Florida, partnering with local lawyer Hugh A. Corley to form the law firm Archer and Corley. Archer would later be briefly appointed as the fifth Florida Comptroller following the short absence of incumbent Theodore W. Brevard. He would serve from November 1854 until Brevard's return in January 1855.

== Death and legacy ==
Archer died in Tallahassee on June 1, 1859, from heart disease. He is buried in the Old City Cemetery in Tallahassee.

Shortly after his death, his friend David Levy Yulee named the town of Archer, Florida, after him. In the 1840's, it was named Deer Hammock or Darden’s Hammock.

Political offices
Preceded by new office	Secretary of State of Florida; 1845–1848	Succeeded by Augustus Maxwell
Legal offices
Preceded by Augustus Maxwell	Attorney General of Florida; 1848	Succeeded by David P. Hogue
