= Richard H. Simpson =

American politician

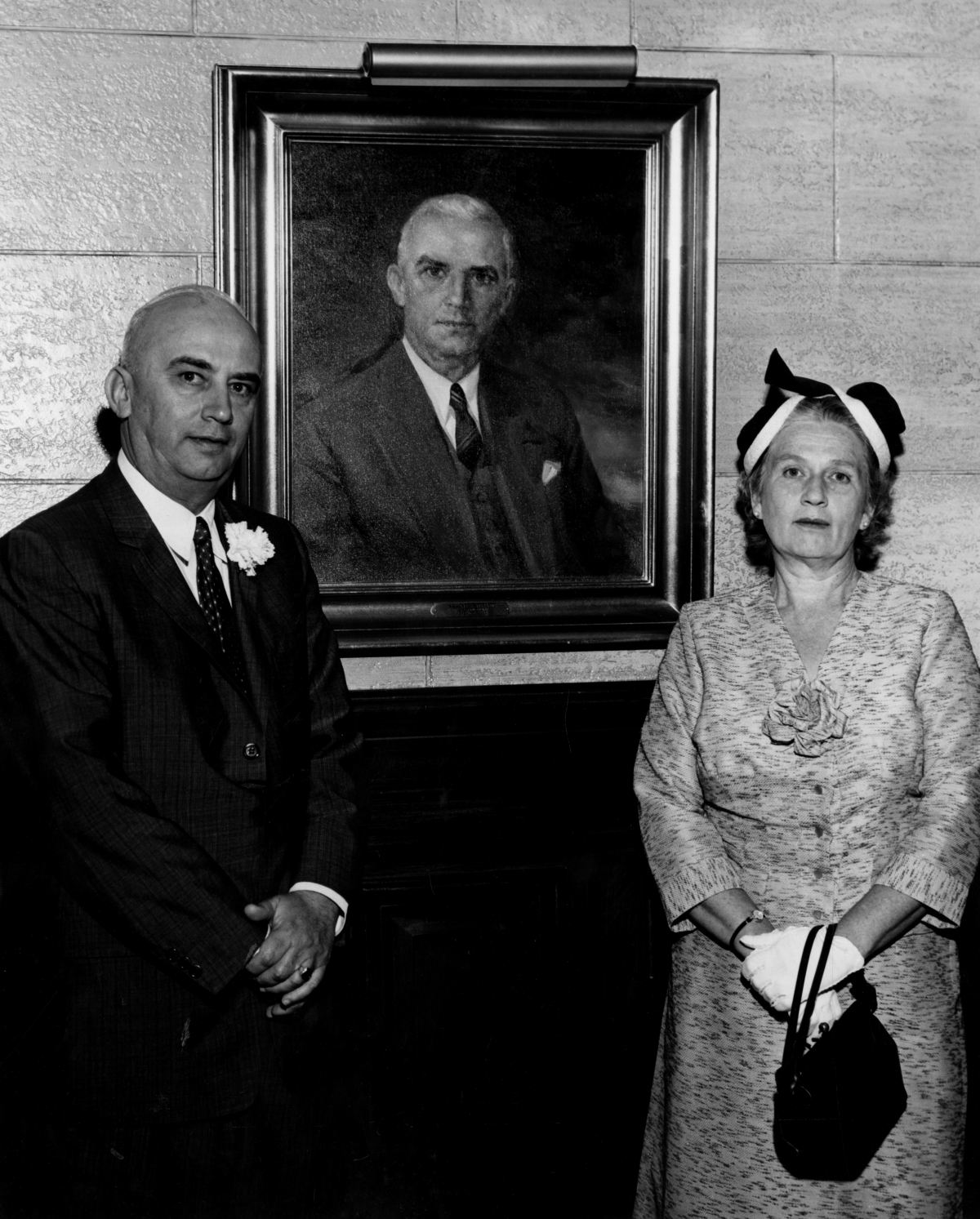
- Simpson (left) with his wife, 1959

Member of the Florida House of Representatives from Jefferson County
- In office 1939–1951

Speaker of the Florida House of Representatives
- In office 1943–1945
- Preceded by: Daniel T. McCarty
- Succeeded by: Evans Crary

Personal details
- Born: January 9, 1905 Chicago, Illinois, U.S.
- Died: November 2, 1968 (aged 63)
- Party: Democratic
- Education: Purdue University; University of Florida

Richard H. Simpson (January 9, 1905 – November 2, 1968) was an American politician. He served as a Democratic member of the Florida House of Representatives.

== Life and career ==
Simpson was born in Chicago, Illinois. He attended Georgia Military Academy, Purdue University and the University of Florida.

Simpson served in the Florida House of Representatives from 1939 to 1951.

Simpson died on November 2, 1968, at the age of 63.
