= WITV (Florida) =

Television station in Fort Lauderdale, Florida (1953–1958)

- Fort Lauderdale, Florida; United States
- Channels: Analog: 17 (UHF)

Programming
- Affiliations: DuMont (1953–1956); ABC (1953–1957); Independent station (1957–1958)

Ownership
- Owner: Gerico Investment Company

History
- First air date: December 1, 1953
- Last air date: May 11, 1958

Technical information
- ERP: 465 kW
- HAAT: 223 m (730 ft)
- Transmitter coordinates: 25°58′46″N 80°11′50″W

WITV (channel 17) was a television station in Fort Lauderdale, Florida, United States. Owned by the Gerico Investment Company, it was the third television station on the air in the Miami–Fort Lauderdale area and the fourth in South Florida, operating from December 1953 to May 1958. It was doomed by troubles that plagued ultra high frequency (UHF) television in the days before the All-Channel Receiver Act and particularly the arrival of two additional VHF TV stations to Miami in 1956 and 1957. The WITV transmitter facility was purchased by the Dade County School Board, eventually resulting in the reactivation of channel 17 as Miami-based WLRN-TV in 1962.

== History ==
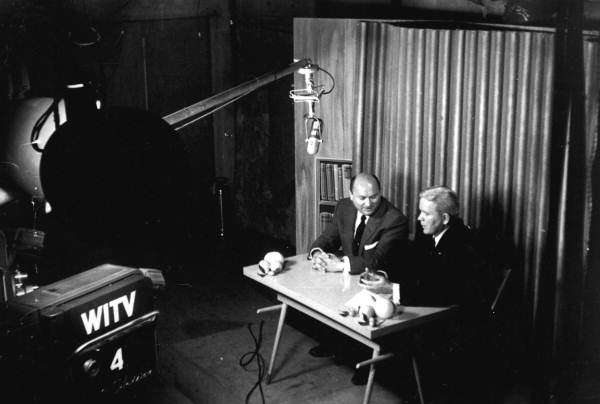
Former Florida governor Fuller Warren (right) in the WITV studios.

When the Federal Communications Commission (FCC) lifted its four-year-old freeze on television station applications in 1948, channels 17 and 23 were placed in Fort Lauderdale. Applications for both allotments were received, and on July 30, 1952, the FCC granted channel 23 to radio station WFTL and channel 17 to Gerico Investment. Gerico, a group of local business interests, added television experience when Mortimer Loewi, a former executive of the DuMont Television Network, bought a stake in the firm at the start of 1953. Construction took place that fall, with studios going up in the Hollywood Ridge Farms area and a transmitter being constructed at Hallandale. The station picked up affiliations with DuMont and ABC, though first-call rights for any of these networks' programs were held by the original VHF station in the region, WTVJ (channel 4). A 90-minute opening program on the evening of December 1, 1953, marked the start of channel 17's broadcasting life. Former Florida governor Fuller Warren joined the station in early 1954 as a political analyst and hosted a weekly news commentary program on Sunday nights.

In August 1954, officials from WITV and WFTL-TV announced they were pursuing a merger agreement to combine forces and avoid competition among UHF stations with the threat of networks' preference for VHF stations looming. Their announcement followed a more definite report by the Miami Herald that WITV was to buy out the other station, with channel 17 surviving the merger. However, no final agreement could be reached as the parties differed on particulars of the combination of the two stations. Three months later, WFTL-TV was sold to Storer Broadcasting, which also purchased a construction permit for WMIE-TV channel 27 in Miami. WFTL-TV moved to Miami as WGBS-TV by combining the assets and channel number of WFTL-TV with the Miami location and proposed facilities of the unbuilt WMIE-TV.

In 1957, WITV proposed to move to channel 6, which had just been allocated to Miami, claiming that the FCC's action "effectively deleted UHF service in the Miami area". The idea of a channel 6 station drew criticism to the north and south, from co-channel stations in Orlando (WDBO-TV) and Havana (CMQ-TV). However, the commission rejected WITV's assertion that it was entitled to the channel, ordering it to file applications opposite other interested bidders, and denied its effort to bid on channels 7 and 10, whose statuses had been thrown into doubt due to illegal influence on their comparative hearing proceedings. Meanwhile, the station was given what amounted to a death blow when the third VHF station for Miami appeared. WGBS-TV folded in April 1957 and sold its equipment to Public Service Television, a division of National Airlines, which started up WPST-TV on channel 10 that August and took away the ABC affiliation that had been held by WITV since its inception.

The station then adopted a "curtailed" schedule of programming, broadcasting the minimum 28 hours a week. This continued until WITV limped off the air after its broadcast day on May 11, 1958; owner Loewi was reported to be on a yacht at sea and thus unavailable for comment. The news was reported at the time by the Miami Herald and The Miami News, but it was more than a month before it was "generally known" at the FCC and reported by trade publications. Bill Bayer, WITV's news director from the station's launch, joined WPST-TV in the same capacity and took his weekly Sunday night political debate program with him.

=== Channel 17 after WITV ===
Gerico retained the construction permit and had the option of selling the station or putting it back on the air at a later date. However, the losses it racked up also stayed with the firm. In July 1958, the American Research Bureau, Sterling Television Co., and TelePrompTer Corporation sued to force the company into involuntary bankruptcy. Assets exceeded liabilities by more than $200,000, per later statements in federal bankruptcy court. Assets were sold at a bankruptcy auction in March 1959. The Lunar Corporation purchased the former transmitter site and entered into negotiations for its possible use as a transmission facility for educational television.

In 1959, the Dade County school board purchased the site for $200,000 and received an exemption to use the site, 5 miles (8.0 km) too close to Daytona Beach's channel 2 station otherwise, to relocate WTHS-TV, its educational station, from a facility in Miami. The project would expand the reach of the station, which had previously been limited to Dade, to include areas in Broward County and Palm Beach County.

After purchasing the site, the school board got channel 17 dreams of its own. Since it owned the former WITV equipment and had its own studios, the Dade County school board authorized attorneys to prosecute a plan to reactivate channel 17 for educational use in 1960. This application was designated for hearing by the FCC, along with the license renewal for WITV, in 1961. An FCC hearing examiner sided with the school board, and the channel was shifted from Fort Lauderdale to Miami and reserved for noncommercial use so that the school board could use the same Miami studios for both facilities. Operations of WSEC-TV, changed to WLRN-TV in 1973, began with program tests on June 26, 1962, with several high school courses moving over from WTHS-TV and sets in the schools being fitted with UHF converters.
