= J. J. Harris =

American doctor, Confederate soldier, orange grower, postmaster and politician

Junius J. Harris (January 11, 1834 – December 24, 1906) was a medical doctor, Confederate soldier, orange grower, state legislator, and postmaster who served as Speaker of the Florida House of Representatives.

== Early life ==
Harris was born January 11, 1834, in Washington County, Georgia, to Daniel and Vashti (Franklin) Harris. His father was a planter from North Carolina who died in 1863; his mother was from Georgia, and he had an elder brother Rev. Thomas M. Harris.

Harris was educated at Emory College in Oxford, Georgia, graduating in 1853, then read medicine with doctors Henry and Robert Campbell in Augusta, Georgia; he graduated in 1855. He started practising medicine in Washington, Georgia, for a year before moving to Rome, Georgia, but was forced to give up his growing practice due to health issues.

He married Miss R. R. Mitchell, daughter of David R. Mitchell, November 1, 1855, and together they had seven children.

Shortly after moving to Americus, Georgia, in 1861 Harris enlisted in the Confederate Army under Colonel A. S. Cutt and served in the American Civil War for four years as a private until forced to stop again due to health issues. He returned to Smithville, Georgia, and practised medicine until 1869, when he moved to Brunswick, Georgia, and was elected to be mayor twice.

Harris moved to Orange County, Florida, in 1874 and started orange growing.

== Politics ==
Harris was first elected to the Florida House of Representatives in 1879, then again in 1881 when he became speaker of the house and finally again just as a representative the 1883-84 session. He lived in Tuscawilla and represented Orange County, Florida.

On January 4, the 1881 session was assembled and 1881 Harris motioned for Charles Dougherty to be elected Speaker pro tem. Mr. Cottrell of Levy County, Florida later nominated Harris for Speaker who won with 53 votes for and 12 abstaining.

== Later life ==
Harris moved to Sanford, Florida, in 1882 where he purchased the Sanford Journal. He was its editor for several years and later edited a newspaper at West Palm Beach.

In 1887 Harris was appointed to the position of Sanford Postmaster. He was Mayor of Sanford on more than one occasion.

== Death ==
Harris died December 24, 1906, from paralysis at his home in Sanford, Florida and was survived by his wife and five daughters.

== Notes ==
- The source Biographical Souvenir of the States of Georgia and Florida has him serving three terms plus one as speaker but multiple other sources claim two terms plus one as speaker.
