= Hal Chaires =

American politician

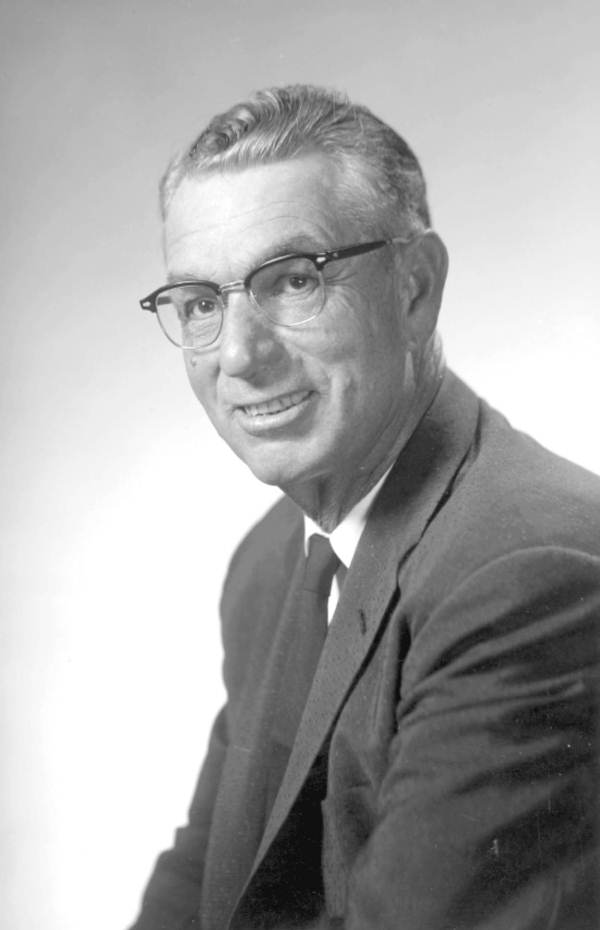
- Chaires in 1961

Member of the Florida House of Representatives from Dixie County
- In office 1955–1965
- Preceded by: K. Griner

Personal details
- Born: August 10, 1908 Old Town, Florida, U.S.
- Died: September 23, 1965 (aged 57)
- Party: Democratic
- Education: University of Florida

Hal Chaires (August 10, 1908 – September 23, 1965) was an American politician. He served as a Democratic member of the Florida House of Representatives.

== Life and career ==
Chaires was born in Old Town, Florida. He attended the University of Florida.

Chaires served in the Florida House of Representatives from 1955 to 1965.

Chaires died in September 1965 at his home, at the age of 57.
