= George Pierce Wood =

American politician

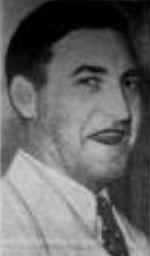
- Wood in 1939

Member of the Florida House of Representatives from Liberty County
- In office 1929–1941

Speaker of the Florida House of Representatives
- In office 1939–1941
- Preceded by: William McLean Christie
- Succeeded by: Daniel T. McCarty

Personal details
- Born: August 26, 1895 Attapulgus, Georgia, U.S.
- Died: July 8, 1945 (aged 49)
- Party: Democratic
- Education: Emory College; University of Florida

George Pierce Wood (August 26, 1895 – July 8, 1945), also known as G. Pierce Wood, was an American politician. He served as a Democratic member of the Florida House of Representatives.

== Life and career ==
Wood was born in Attapulgus, Georgia. He attended Emory College and the University of Florida.

Wood served in the Florida House of Representatives from 1929 to 1941.

Wood died on July 8, 1945, at the age of 49.
