= W. H. Brewton =

American politician

Member of the Florida Senate from the 38th district
- In office 1943
- Preceded by: John W. Gideons
- Succeeded by: Arthur Lafayette Bryant

Personal details
- Born: November 28, 1888
- Died: January 6, 1965 (aged 76)
- Party: Democratic

W. H. Brewton (November 28, 1888 – January 6, 1965) was an American politician. He served as a Democratic Party member for the 38th district of the Florida Senate.
