= Fred L. Touchton =

American politician

Member of the Florida Senate from the 38th district
- In office 1935–1939
- Preceded by: Samuel W. Getzen
- Succeeded by: John W. Gideons

Personal details
- Born: August 28, 1891
- Died: July 28, 1947 (aged 55)
- Party: Democratic

Fred L. Touchton (August 28, 1891 – July 28, 1947) was an American politician. He served as a Democratic Party member in the 38th district of the Florida Senate.
