= DeCarr Covington =

American politician

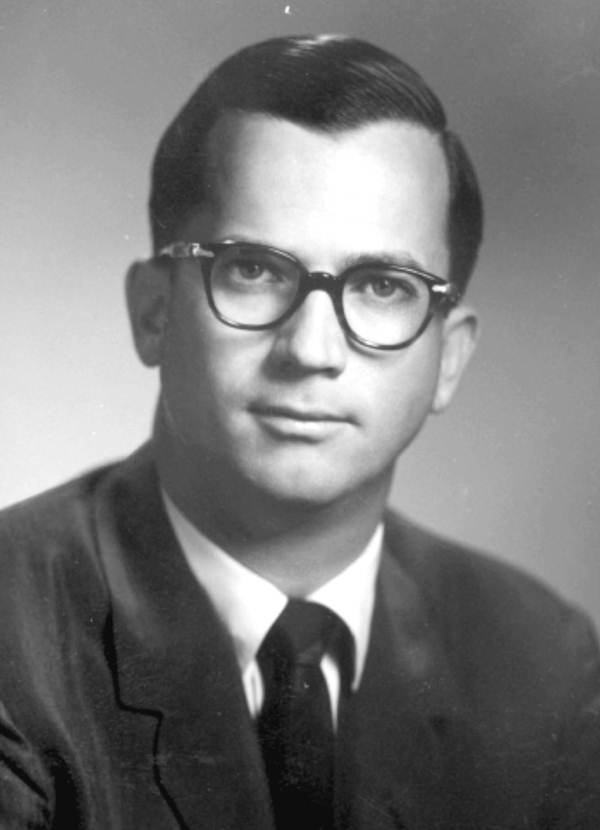
- Covington in 1962

Member of the Florida Senate from the 38th district
- In office 1962–1965
- Preceded by: J. C. Getzen
- Succeeded by: Richard Deeb

Member of the Florida Senate from the 16th district
- In office 1966–1967

Personal details
- Born: July 22, 1928 Dade City, Florida, U.S.
- Died: May 15, 1999 (aged 70) Brandon, Florida, U.S.
- Party: Democratic

DeCarr Dowman Covington Jr. (July 22, 1928 – May 15, 1999) was an American property developer and politician. He served as a Democratic Party member for the 16th and 38th district of the Florida Senate.

His father was photographed among guests at a birthday party in Quincy, Florida.

He was involved in a legal case over the use of special taxing districts. He eventually had the files expunged. He developed orange groves near the Lake Padgett Estates into neighborhoods in Pasco County, Florida.
