= Ion Farris =

American politician (1878–1934)

Ion Lowndes Farris
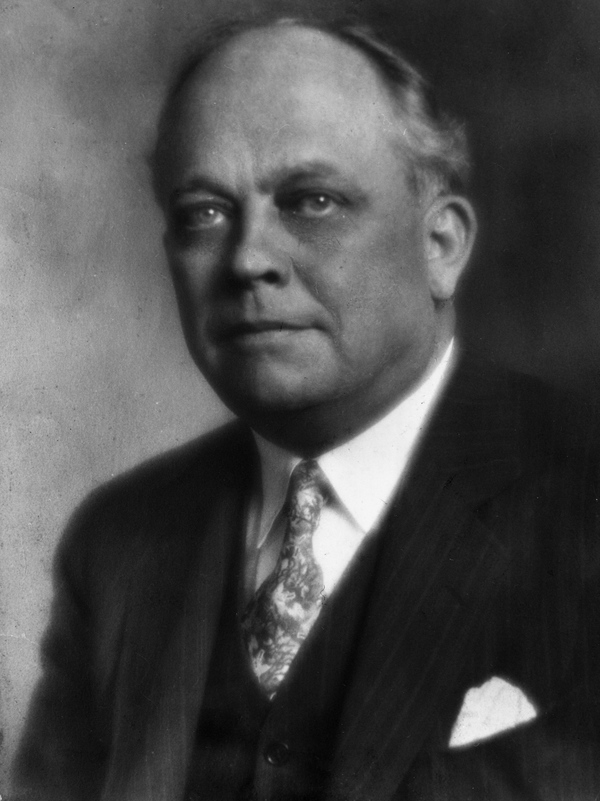
- Farris circa 1900

Member of the Florida Senate from the 18th district
- In office 1913–1917

Speaker of the Florida House of Representatives
- In office 1909; 1913

Member of the Florida House of Representatives from the Duval County district
- In office 1907–1911; 1913
- Preceded by: Henry Holland Buckman
- Succeeded by: J. Turner Butler; Frank L. Dancy

Personal details
- Born: September 14, 1878 Savannah, Georgia
- Died: November 10, 1934 (aged 56) Neptune Beach, Florida
- Party: Democratic
- Profession: Attorney

Ion Lowndes Farris (September 14, 1878 – November 10, 1934) was an American politician and attorney from Florida. He served a member of the Florida House of Representatives and the Florida Senate. He served twice as the speaker of the Florida House of Representatives in both 1909 and 1913, at a time when the legislature met only once every two years. He then moved on to become a member of the Florida Senate for 1915 and 1917. He was an ardent supporter of former Governor of Florida Napoleon Broward, and led the effort to get Broward County named after him. He also led efforts to reduce the number of committees in the Senate. In 1916, he made a run for governor, but lost the Democrat primary. He led efforts to drain the Everglades, and forced the other candidates to take a position on the issue. he died in Florida in 1934.

== Life ==
Farris was born in 1878 in Savannah, Georgia. While he was still a child, he moved to Marion County, Florida, with his family. Farris dropped out of high school to enter the workplace; he first went to work with his father as a boilermaker. He studied stenography and later began an apprenticeship with a law firm.

He moved to Jacksonville, Florida, at 21, and lived there the rest of his life. He married Allie Liddell in January 1901, and had three children with her; his youngest child was named for William Jennings Bryan, with whom he had a close friendship. His nephew, C. Farris Bryant, became the 34th governor of Florida.

== Legal career ==
Farris began his legal education studying at the law offices of Herbert Anderson and W.K. Zewadski. After his studies, he passed the bar exam and became an attorney. He specialized as a criminal defense lawyer.

== Political career ==
=== Florida House ===
Farris was first elected to the Florida House of Representatives in 1907, taking over the seat previously held by Henry Holland Buckman. He served until 1909, when Frank E. Butler took over for the 1911 term. He returned to the House in 1913. He served as the speaker of the Florida House of Representatives twice, in both 1909 and 1913, at a time when the Florida Legislature met only once every two years. At the time, he was the youngest person to ever hold the position. In the 1913 bid for the position, he ran with no opposition. As speaker, he amended the bill that formed Broward County, Florida, to honor former Governor Broward, changing it from its original intended name of Everglades County.

=== Florida Senate ===
After leaving the House in 1913, Farris successfully ran for the Florida Senate that same year. Once there, he sponsored efforts to remove a number of committees and reorganize the lawmaking the process into what he saw as a more streamlined effort. He sat on multiple committees, including the Judiciary B, Temperance, and Municipality Committees.

=== Gubernatorial run ===
Farris ran for governor of Florida in 1916. His campaign slogan was "Back to Broward", referring to the policies of former Governor Napoleon Bonaparte Broward, and his platform included draining the Everglades so that the land could be commercially developed. Farris lost the Democrat primary, but forced the other candidates in the race to address the drainage, successfully making it an election issue.

== Political views ==
Farris identified as a progressive. He advocated for home rule and sponsored legislation that gave local governments greater control over their own organization.
