= List of speakers of the Florida House of Representatives =

Speaker of the Florida House of Representatives
- Seal of the Florida House of Representatives

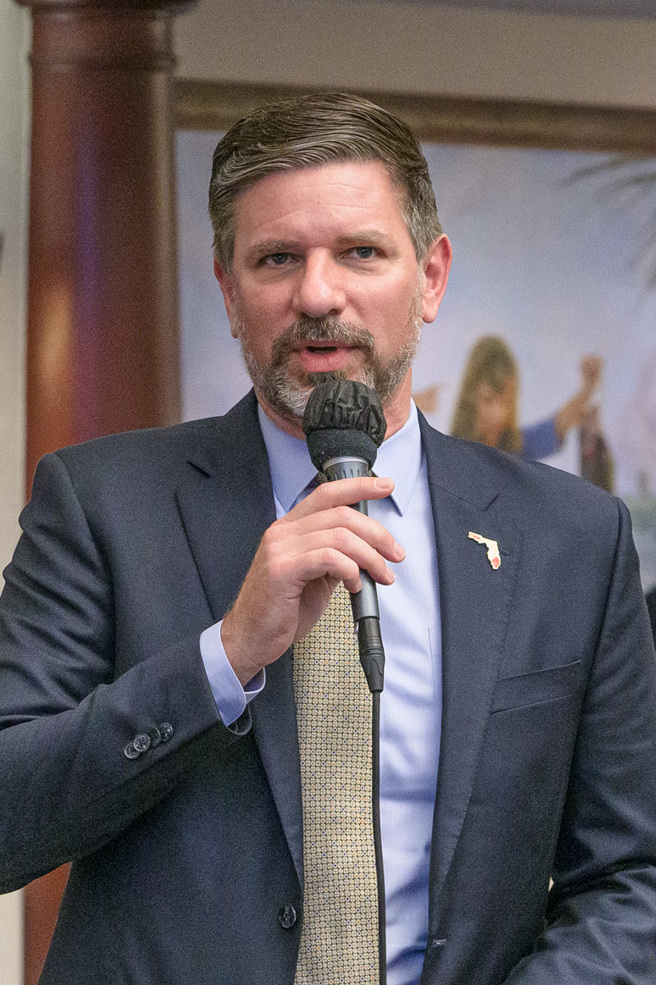
- Incumbent; Sam Garrison since November 17, 2026
- Legislative branch of the Florida government
- Style: Mr. Speaker (informal – male); Madam Speaker (informal – female); The Honorable (formal)
- Type: Presiding officer
- Appointer: House of Representatives
- Term length: 2 years; renewable
- Constituting instrument: Constitution of Florida
- Inaugural holder: Hugh Archer
- Formation: 1845 (180 years ago)

The speaker is the presiding member of the Florida House of Representatives. The Speaker and his staff provide direction and coordination to employees throughout the House and serve the members in carrying out their constitutional responsibilities. The current Speaker is Sam Garrison of Clay County who represents the 11th State House District of Florida.

== Speakers ==
Picture	Speaker	Session	Start of service	End of service	Party	County	Residence
1838 Constitution
	Hugh Archer	1st	June 23, 1845	July 26, 1845		Leon	Tallahassee
	Isaac Ferguson, Jr.	Adj.	November 17, 1845	December 29, 1845	Democratic	Gadsden	Quincy
	Robert Brown	2nd	November 23, 1846	January 6, 1847	Democratic	Columbia	
	Joseph B. Lancaster	3rd	November 27, 1847	December 23, 1847	Whig	Duval	Jacksonville
	John Chain	3rd	December 23, 1847	January 8, 1848		Santa Rosa	Milton
	Benjamin A. Putnam	4th	November 27, 1848	January 13, 1849	Whig	St. Johns	St. Augustine
	Hugh Archer	5th	November 25, 1850	January 24, 1851	Whig	Leon	Tallahassee
	Abraham K. Allison	6th	November 22, 1852	January 14, 1853	Democratic	Gadsden	Quincy
	William F. Russell	7th	November 27, 1854	January 13, 1855		St. Lucie	Fort Pierce
	Philip Dell	Adj.	November 26, 1855	December 15, 1855	Democratic	Alachua	Newnansville
	Hamlin Valentine Snell	8th	November 24, 1856	December 27, 1856	Democratic	Manatee	Manatee
	John B. Galbraith	9th	November 28, 1858	January 15, 1859	Democratic	Leon	Tallahassee
	John B. Galbraith	Adj.	November 28, 1858	December 22, 1858	Democratic	Leon	Tallahassee
	John B. Galbraith	10th	November 26, 1860	February 14, 1861	Democratic	Leon	Tallahassee
	Samuel B. Love	11th	November 18, 1861	December 17, 1861	Democratic	Gadsden	Quincy
	Thomas Jefferson Eppes	12th	November 17, 1862	December 15, 1862	Democratic	Franklin	Apalachicola
	Thomas Jefferson Eppes	12th	November 16, 1863	December 4, 1863	Democratic	Franklin	Apalachicola
	Philip Dell	13th	November 21, 1864	December 7, 1864	Democratic	Alachua	Newnansville
	Joseph John Williams	14th	December 18, 1865	January 16, 1866	Democratic	Leon	Tallahassee
	Joseph John Williams	14th (2nd)	November 14, 1866	December 14, 1866	Democratic	Leon	Tallahassee
1868 Constitution
	William W. Moore	1st	June 8, 1868	August 6, 1868	Republican	Columbia	Wellborn
	William W. Moore	Extra.	November 3, 1868	November 7, 1868	Republican	Columbia	Wellborn
	Marcellus L. Stearns	2nd	January 5, 1869	February 1, 1869	Republican	Gadsden	Quincy
	William W. Moore	Extra.	June 8, 1869	June 24, 1869	Republican	Columbia	Wellborn
	Simon B. Conover		1873	1873	Republican	Leon	Tallahassee
	Malachi Martin		1874	1874	Republican	Gadsden	Chattahoochee
	Thomas Hannah		1875	1875	Democratic	Washington	Vernon
	G.G. McWhorter		1877	1877	Democratic	Santa Rosa	Milton
	Charles Dougherty		1879	1879	Democratic	Volusia	Port Orange
	Junius J. Harris		1881	1881	Democratic	Orange	Tuscawilla
	Charles Dougherty		1883	1883	Democratic	Volusia	Port Orange
	Robert Wyche Davis		1885	1885	Democratic	Clay	Green Cove Springs
1885 Constitution
	Samuel Pasco		1887	May 23, 1887	Democratic	Jefferson	Monticello
	George H. Browne		1887	1887	Democratic	Orange	Oviedo
	John L. Gaskins		1889	1893	Democratic	Bradford	Starke
	William Sherman Jennings		1895	1895	Democratic	Hernando	Brooksville
	Dannitte Hill Mays		1897	1897	Democratic	Jefferson	Monticello
	Robert McNamee		1899	1899	Democratic	Lake	Leesburg
	John W Watson		1901	1901	Democratic	Osceola	Kissimmee
	Cromwell Gibbons		1903	1903	Democratic	Duval	Jacksonville
	Albert W. Gilchrist		1905	1905	Democratic	DeSoto	Punta Gorda
	Eugene S. Matthews		1907	1907	Democratic	Bradford	Starke
	Ion Farris		1909	1909	Democratic	Duval	Jacksonville
	Thomas Albert Jennings		1911	1911	Democratic	Escambia	Pensacola
	Ion Farris		1913	1913	Democratic	Duval	Jacksonville
	Cary A. Hardee		1915	1917	Democratic	Suwannee	Live Oak
	George H. Wilder		1918	1919	Democratic	Hillsborough	Plant City
	Frank E. Jennings		1921	1921	Democratic	Duval	Jacksonville
	L.D. Edge		1923	1923	Democratic	Lake	Groveland
	A. Y. Milam		1925	1927	Democratic	Duval	Jacksonville
	Fred Henry Davis		1927	1929	Democratic	Leon	Tallahassee
	Samuel W. Getzen		1929	1931	Democratic	Sumter	Bushnell
	E. Clay Lewis Jr.		1931	1933	Democratic	Gulf	Port St. Joe
	Peter Tomasello Jr.		1933	1935	Democratic	Okeechobee	Okeechobee
	W. B. Bishop		1935	1937	Democratic	Jefferson	Nash
	William McLean Christie		1937	1939	Democratic	Duval	Jacksonville
	George Pierce Wood		1939	1941	Democratic	Liberty	Wilma
	Daniel T. McCarty		1941	1943	Democratic	St. Lucie	Fort Pierce
	Richard H. Simpson		1943	1945	Democratic	Jefferson	Monticello
	Evans Crary		1945	1947	Democratic	Martin	Stewart
	Tom Beasley		1947	1949	Democratic	Walton	DeFuniak Springs
	Perry E. Murray		1949	1951	Democratic	Polk	Frostproof
	Elmer B. Elliott		1951	1953	Democratic	Palm Beach	Pahokee
	C. Farris Bryant		1953	1955	Democratic	Marion	Ocala
	Thomas E. David		1955	1957	Democratic	Broward	Hollywood
	Doyle Conner		1957	1959	Democratic	Bradford	Starke
	Tom Beasley		1959	1961	Democratic	Walton	DeFuniak Springs
	William V. Chappell, Jr.		1961	1963	Democratic	Marion	Ocala
	Mallory Horne		1963	1965	Democratic	Leon	Tallahassee
	E. C. Rowell		1965	1967	Democratic	Sumter	Wildwood
	Ralph Turlington		1967	1969	Democratic	Alachua	Gainesville
1968 Constitution
	Frederick H. Schultz		1969	1970	Democratic	Duval	Jacksonville
	Richard A. Pettigrew		1971	1972	Democratic	Dade	Miami
	T. Terrell Sessums		1973	1974	Democratic	Hillsborough	Tampa
	Donald L. Tucker		1974	1978	Democratic	Leon	Tallahassee
	J. Hyatt Brown		1978	1980	Democratic	Volusia	Daytona Beach
	Ralph Haben		1981	1982	Democratic	Manatee	Palmetto
	H. Lee Moffitt		1983	1984	Democratic	Hillsborough	Tampa
	James Harold Thompson		1985	1986	Democratic	Gadsden	Quincy
	Jon L. Mills		November 18, 1987	November 14, 1988	Democratic	Alachua	Gainesville
	Tom Gustafson		November 14, 1988	November 20, 1990	Democratic	Broward	Fort Lauderdale
	T. K. Wetherell		November 20, 1990	November 17, 1992	Democratic	Volusia	Daytona Beach
	Bolley Johnson		November 17, 1992	November 22, 1994	Democratic	Santa Rosa	Milton
	Peter Rudy Wallace		November 22, 1994	November 19, 1996	Democratic	Pinellas	St. Petersburg
	Daniel Webster		November 19, 1996	November 17, 1998	Republican	Orange	Orlando
	John Thrasher		November 17, 1998	November 21, 2000	Republican	Duval	Orange Park
	Tom Feeney		November 21, 2000	November 19, 2002	Republican	Seminole	Oviedo
	Johnnie Byrd		November 19, 2002	November 16, 2004	Republican	Hillsborough	Plant City
	Allan Bense		November 16, 2004	November 21, 2006	Republican	Bay	Panama City
	Marco Rubio		November 21, 2006	November 18, 2008	Republican	Miami-Dade	West Miami
	Ray Sansom		November 18, 2008	February 2, 2009 (resigned)	Republican	Okaloosa	Destin
	Larry Cretul		March 3, 2009	November 16, 2010	Republican	Marion	Ocala
	Dean Cannon		November 16, 2010	November 20, 2012	Republican	Orange	Winter Park
	Will Weatherford		November 20, 2012	November 18, 2014	Republican	Pasco	Wesley Chapel
	Steve Crisafulli		November 18, 2014	November 22, 2016	Republican	Brevard	Merritt Island
	Richard Corcoran		November 22, 2016	November 20, 2018	Republican	Pasco	Land O' Lakes
	José R. Oliva		November 20, 2018	November 17, 2020	Republican	Miami-Dade	Miami Lakes
	Chris Sprowls		November 17, 2020	November 22, 2022	Republican	Pinellas	Palm Harbor
	Paul Renner		November 22, 2022	November 19, 2024	Republican	Flagler	Palm Coast
	Daniel Perez		November 19, 2024	August 21, 2026	Republican	Miami-Dade	Miami
	Wyman Duggan	Acting	August 21, 2026	November 17, 2026	Republican	Duval	Jacksonville
	Sam Garrison		November 17, 2026	Present	Republican	Clay	Fleming Island

=== Speakers pro tempore ===
- John L. Ryals (1977–1978)
- Richard S. Hodes (1978–1980)
- Barry Kutun (1980–1982)
- Steve Pajcic (1982–1984)
- Elaine Gordon (1984–1986)
- James C. Burke (1987–1988)
- Samuel Mitchell (1989–1990)
- Everett A. Kelly (1990–1992)
- Elaine Bloom (1992–1994)
- Jack Ascherl (1994–1996)
- Luis C. Morse (1996–1998)
- Dennis L. Jones (1998–2000)
- Sandra L. Murman (2000–2002)
- Lindsay M. Harrington (2002–2004)
- Leslie Waters (2004–2006)
- Dennis K. Baxley (2006–2007)
- Marty Bowen (2007–2008)
- Larry Cretul (2008–2009)
- Ronald "Ron" Reagan (2009–2010)
- John Legg (2010–2012)
- Marti Coley (2012–2014)
- Matt Hudson (2014–2016)
- Jeanette Núñez (2016–2018)
- MaryLynn Magar (2018–2020)
- Bryan Avila (2020–2022)
- Chuck Clemons (2022–2024)
- Wyman Duggan (2024–2026)
- Demi Busatta (2026-present)

== See also ==
- Florida Democratic Party
- Republican Party of Florida
- List of presidents of the Florida Senate
- List of Florida state legislatures
