= William McLean Christie =

American politician

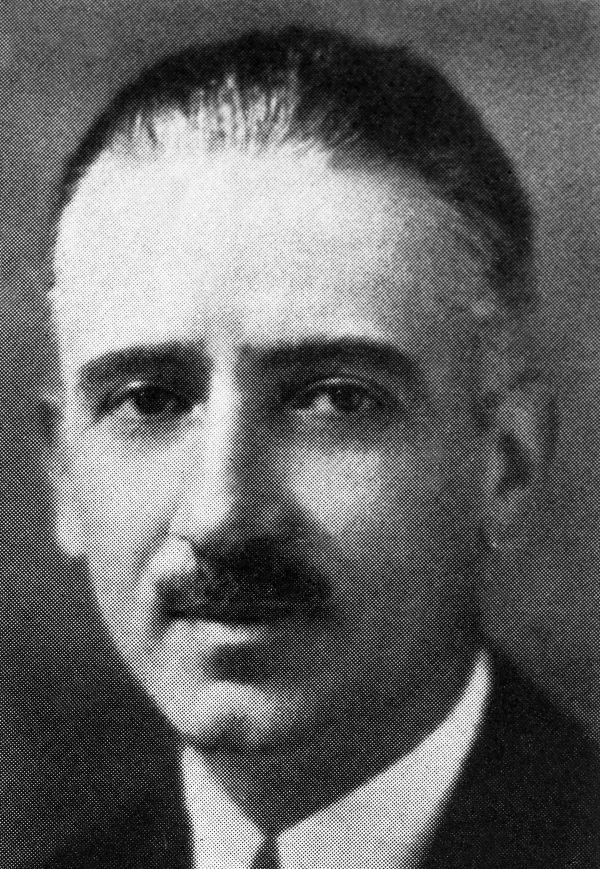
- Christie in 1933

Member of the Florida House of Representatives from Duval County
- In office 1933–1939

Speaker of the Florida House of Representatives
- In office 1937–1939
- Preceded by: W. B. Bishop
- Succeeded by: George Pierce Wood

Personal details
- Born: August 8, 1892 Jacksonville, Florida, U.S.
- Died: July 9, 1939 (aged 46)
- Party: Democratic
- Education: University of Florida; University of North Carolina

William McLean Christie (August 8, 1892 – July 9, 1939) was an American politician. He served as a Democratic member of the Florida House of Representatives.

== Life and career ==
Christie was born in Jacksonville, Florida. He attended the University of Florida and the University of North Carolina, where he studied law.

Christie served in the Florida House of Representatives from 1933 to 1939.

Christie died in an automobile accident on July 9, 1939, at the age of 46.
