= Peter Tomasello Jr. =

American politician

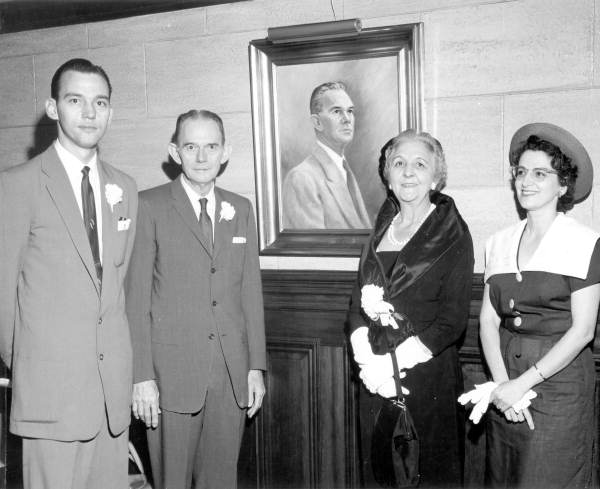
Photo of Peter Tomasello Jr. and members of his family at the unveiling of his Florida House Speaker portrait (1959)

Peter Tomasello Jr. (1900 – November 17, 1960) was a politician in Florida. He was elected to serve in the Florida House of Representatives in 1928, and served until 1940. He served as Speaker of the Florida House from 1933 to 1935. He had first stood for the speaker of the house position for the 1931 session but lost to E. Clay Lewis Jr.

He was born in 1900 in Pinewood, Santa Rosa County, Florida. His father immigrated from Austria and worked his way up in the limber business. Jr. had a lumber mill.

He had served as a private in the Florida national guard in World War I achieving the rank of sergeant before retiring from service.

He was a candidate in the 1936 Florida gubernatorial election where he came third out of thirteen. He met with gambling interests.

He died in a private hospital in Forest Park, Georgia November 17, 1960, he had been living in Forest Park for 14 years. He was survived by his wife Elizabeth Tomasello (née Carter) and his son Jerome Tomasello.
