= Frank L. Dancy =

American lawyer and politician (1882–1918)

Member of the Florida House of Representatives from Duval County
- In office 1915

Personal details
- Born: September 18, 1882
- Died: January 31, 1918 (aged 35)
- Party: Democratic

Francis L. Dancy (September 18, 1882 – January 31, 1918) was an American lawyer and state legislator in the state of Florida. He represented Duval County in the Florida House of Representatives in 1915.

Dancy was born in Savannah, Georgia, and studied law at the University of Georgia. He moved to Jacksonville, Florida in 1901, where he was elected to several terms of the city council.
