= George C. Dayton =

American politician (1911–1993)

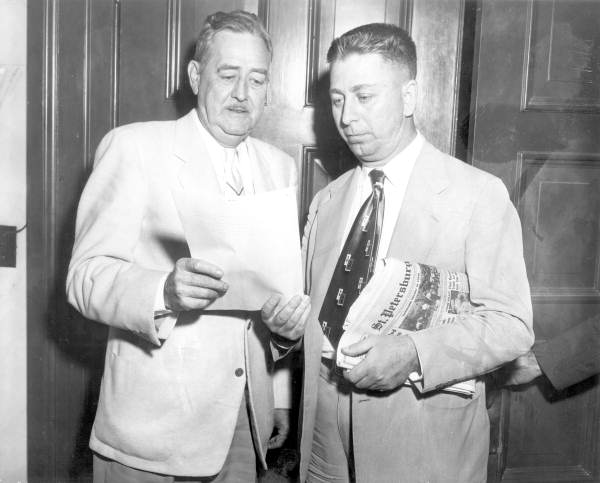
- Dayton (right) with J. Frank Houghton, 1953

Member of the Florida House of Representatives from Pasco County
- In office 1947–1949

Member of the Florida Senate from the 38th district
- In office 1950–1955
- Preceded by: J. C. Getzen
- Succeeded by: J. C. Getzen

Personal details
- Born: October 30, 1911
- Died: December 26, 1993 (aged 82)
- Party: Democratic

George Cheek Dayton (October 30, 1911 – December 26, 1993) served as a Democratic Party member of the Florida House of Representatives. He also served as a member for the 38th district of the Florida Senate.
