= George H. Wilder =

American politician (1870–1959)

George H. Wilder (February 22, 1870 – 1959) was a politician in Florida who served as speaker in the Florida House of Representatives in 1918 and 1919. He lived in Plant City and represented Hillsborough County. He also served as secretary to congressman Stephen M. Sparkman and held office as state vehicle commissioner

His father was cattleman and Confederate Army veteran Calffrey Lafayette Wilder, who died in a lightning strike in 1911.

In 1920, he campaigned for a seat in the Florida State Senate. He lost to Herbert J. Drane.

== See also ==
- List of speakers of the Florida House of Representatives
