= John B. Galbraith =

American politician

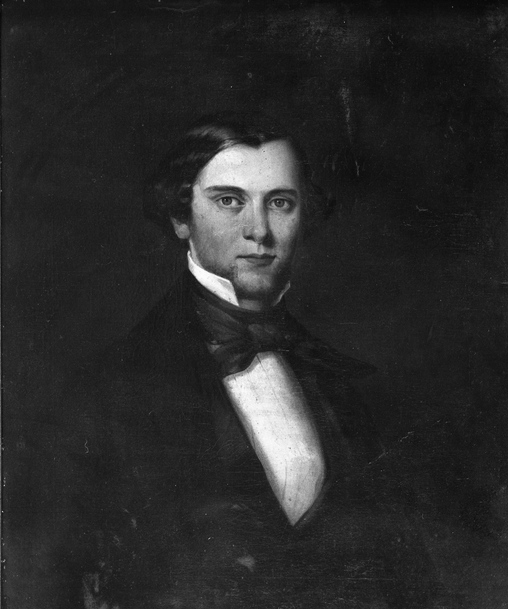

6th Florida Attorney General
- In office March 2, 1861 – 1868
- Governor: John Milton; Abraham K. Allison; William Marvin; David S. Walker
- Preceded by: Mariano D. Papy
- Succeeded by: James Westcott III

9th Speaker of the Florida House of Representatives
- In office November 28, 1858 – February 14, 1861
- Preceded by: Hamlin Valentine Snell
- Succeeded by: Samuel B. Love

Personal details
- Born: 1828 United States
- Died: 1869 (aged 40–41) Florida, U.S.
- Party: Democratic

John B. Galbraith (1828 – 1869), also known as J. B. Galbraith, was an American politician from Florida. Galbraith served as the Florida Attorney General during the American Civil War. He also served as Speaker of the Florida House of Representatives.

== Political career ==
At some point before December 31, 1852, Galbraith served as the Secretary of the Florida Senate. After being elected to the Florida House of Representatives representing Leon County at an undetermined time, Galbraith, a Democrat, was selected to be the ninth Speaker of the Florida House of Representatives on November 28, 1858. In this position, he oversaw Florida's secession from the United States. Galbraith stepped down from this position on February 14, 1861, after being appointed the sixth Florida Attorney General by Governor John Milton.

During his tenure as Attorney General during wartime, Florida's worsening economy and dissatisfaction with Milton led to the creation of an executive council tasked with establishing a system of checks and balances to counter Milton. Though his predecessor, Mariano D. Papy, was appointed to the council, Galbraith was not, weakening his power. Despite this, Galbraith still had a crucial role in boosting Florida's wartime economy. Galbraith instructed the trustees of Florida's Internal Improvement Fund to cancel construction of the St. Johns-Indian River Canal, as funds needed to be diverted to help the war effort. Additionally, Galbraith oversaw the reformation and consolidation of the Florida state militia, which he saw as flawed and imperfect.

Galbraith continued to serve as Florida's Attorney General through the end of the war and for a part of Reconstruction. During Reconstruction, he oversaw the imposition of Florida's Black Codes. Galbraith resigned as Attorney General in 1868, a year before the end of his second term.

== Death ==
Galbraith died in Florida in 1869, not long after resigning his position.
