= Philip Dell =

American politician

Philip Dell was a Florida politician.

The son of James Maxey Dell of Virginia, he owned a large plantation with slaves in Alachua County, Florida in the 1820s and represented the county in the Legislative Council of the Florida Territory from 1825 to 1831. Dell represented Alachua in the House in 1852, 1854, 1855, and 1864 and was Speaker of the Florida House of Representatives in 1855 and 1864. He also represented the 14th District in the Florida Senate in 1856, 1858, and 1858 and was President of the Florida Senate in 1856. He was an early promoter and stockholder of the Florida Railroad.

Dell may have been the brother of John B. Dell, a powerful Democratic politician who represented the 8th District in the Florida Senate and Alachua in the Florida House of Representatives in the 1880s and 1890s.
