= Daniel T. McCarty =

31st Governor of Florida

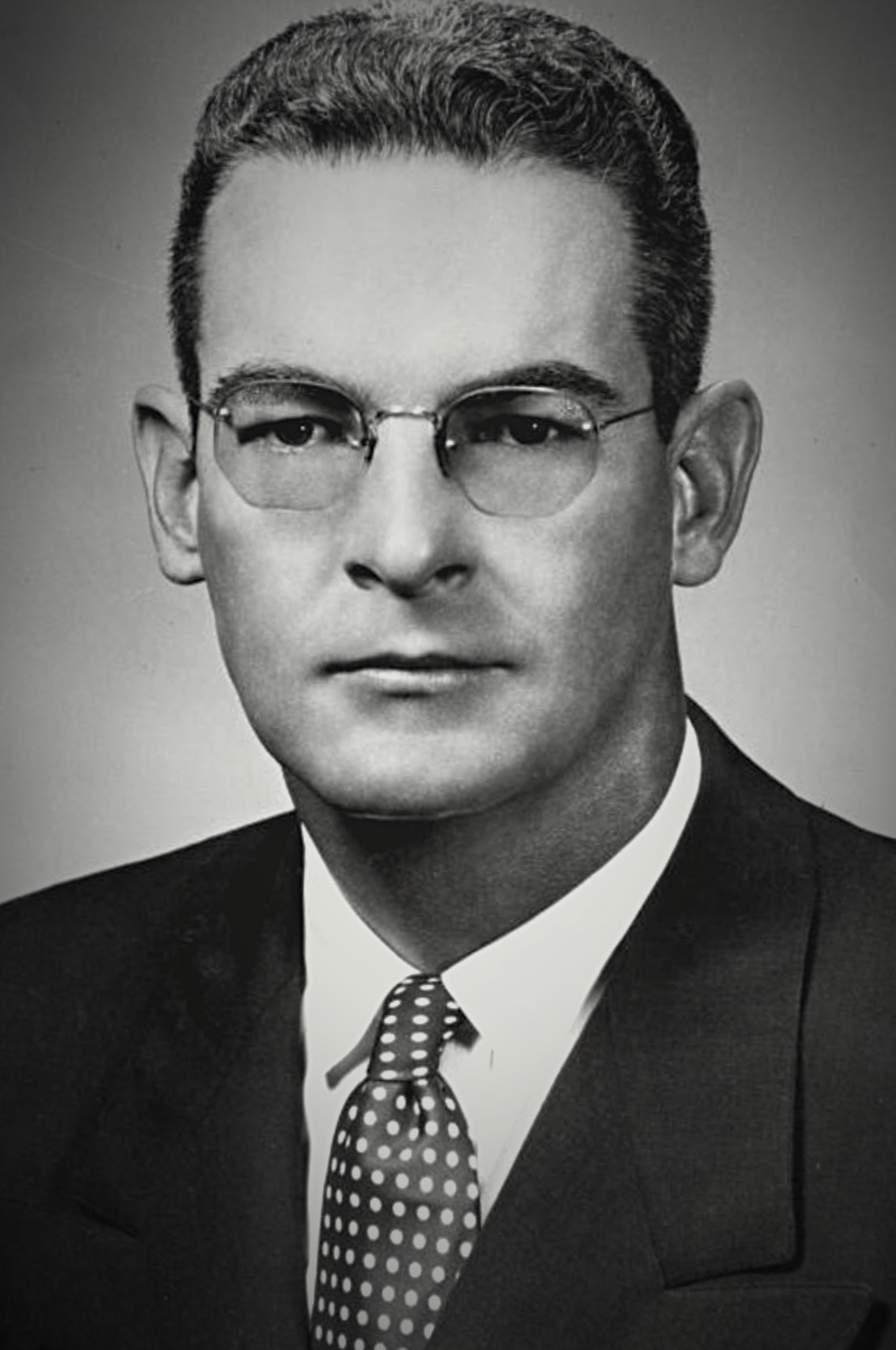

31st Governor of Florida
- In office January 6, 1953 – September 28, 1953
- Preceded by: Fuller Warren
- Succeeded by: Charley E. Johns

Speakers of the Florida House of Representatives
- In office 1941
- Preceded by: George Pierce Wood
- Succeeded by: Richard H. Simpson

Member of the Florida House of Representatives
- In office 1937–1941

Personal details
- Born: January 18, 1912 Fort Pierce, Florida, U.S.
- Died: September 28, 1953 (aged 41) Tallahassee, Florida, U.S.
- Resting place: Palms Cemetery, Ankona, Florida, U.S.
- Party: Democratic
- Spouse: Olie Brown (m. 1940)
- Relatives: John M. McCarty (brother)

Military service
- Allegiance: United States
- Branch/service: United States Army
- Rank: Colonel
- Battles/wars: World War II
- Awards: Bronze Star; Purple Heart; Legion of Merit; Croix de Guerre

Daniel Thomas McCarty (January 18, 1912 – September 28, 1953) was an American politician who served in the Florida House of Representatives and served as its speaker. He briefly served as the 31st Governor of Florida from January 6, 1953, until his death on September 28, 1953.

== Early life ==
Dan McCarty was born on January 18, 1912, in Fort Pierce, Florida, and was the son of Daniel Thomas McCarty and Frances Lardner Moore. His grandfather, Charles "C.T." Tobin McCarty would begin an operation growing pineapples during the 1880s in St. Lucie County. C.T. was killed during a real estate dispute when he was leaving a barber shop in Fort Pierce on January 30, 1907.

His family was described as being prominent and he grew up in a large house on Indian River Drive just south of the present courthouse in downtown Fort Pierce. He attended the local public school in the area, Delaware Avenue School. While attending high school he would be the captain of the school's football team, editor-in-chief of the school yearbook and serve as vice president of his class. After high school he would go to the University of Florida. While at the University of Florida he was extremely active within Florida Blue Key, Student Government, the Sigma Phi Epsilon fraternity, and ROTC.

After finishing his education in 1934, McCarty became a cattleman and citrus grower in Fort Pierce. He married Olie Brown with whom he had three children.

During World War II, he served in the U.S. Army, was promoted to the rank of colonel, and was decorated with the Bronze Star Medal, the Purple Heart, the Legion of Merit, and the French Croix de Guerre. During World War II, he distinguished himself by being among those who landed on D-Day with the Seventh Army in the South of France.

== Political career ==
He began his political career in 1937, where he was elected to the Florida House of Representatives where he served until 1941. During the 1941 session, he served as speaker of the house.

In 1948, he was the runner up for the Democratic nomination for governor. Four years later in 1952, he ran for governor again, and this time was successful in winning the office. During his tenure, he reformed purchasing and hiring practices by the state government, boosted teachers' salaries and created scholarships for teacher training, opposed oil exploration in the Everglades, and instituted aid programs for the disabled. A chain smoker, McCarty's health was already weakened by the end of the 1952 gubernatorial contest.

On February 25, 1953, shortly after assuming the governorship, he suffered a debilitating heart attack. For months McCarty struggled to regain his strength, spending most of his days working in the Governor's mansion. Finally in early September he contracted a severe case of pneumonia and died on September 28, 1953, in Tallahassee. After a large funeral at his lifelong parish church, the old Carpenter Gothic St. Andrew's Episcopal Church across the street from his boyhood home in Fort Pierce, he was buried in the Palms Cemetery in Ankona.

== Honors ==
Dan McCarty Middle School, in St. Lucie County, was named in his honor.

A sabal palm tree was planted on the grounds of the Florida State Capitol in honor of him. He signed a bill as governor making the sabal palm the official state tree.

Party political offices
Preceded by Fuller Warren	Democratic nominee for Governor of Florida; 1952	Succeeded by LeRoy Collins
Political offices
Preceded by Fuller Warren	Governor of Florida; January 6, 1953–September 28, 1953	Succeeded by Charley E. Johns
