= John Beard (politician) =

American politician

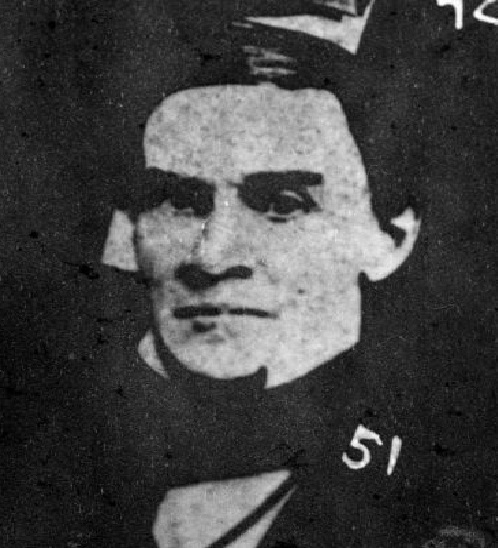

John Beard (June 14, 1797 – July 15, 1876) was a United States newspaper editor and politician from Salisbury, North Carolina. He served in the North Carolina State Senate and held public offices in Florida.

== Biography ==
Beard, only son of Lewis and Susannah (Dunn) Beard, was born in Salisbury, North Carolina, June 14, 1797, and died in Tallahassee, Florida., July 15, 1876, aged 79 years.

He graduated from Yale College in 1817. Returning to his native place at graduation, he was elected the next year, just after reaching his majority, and without opposition, to the North Carolina State Legislature, where he took at once a leading position. In the winter of 1820 he married Anna M Kelly, and settled on a plantation near Salisbury. In 1826 he was elected without opposition to the North Carolina State Senate, but declined a reelection for private reasons. In 1832, although previously a Federalist, he espoused the Nullification theory, and in the three succeeding years was again a member of the State Senate.

His wife having died in 1830, hemarried Maria W. Anderson in the summer of 1838. She waa from St. Augustine, Florida. The next year he moved to St. Augustime, Florida. In 1840 he was appointed Clerk of the U. S District Court for East Florida, and in 1842, U.S. Marshal for the same district, which office he held until Florida was admitted as a State three years later. In Jan. 1847, he was elected State Register of Public Lands (and ex officio Superintendent of Schools), and moved his residence to Tallahassee. This office he resigned in the summer of 1850, on his reluctant acceptance of the Democratic nomination for Congress. He was defeated, but a few months afterwards was elected Comptroller of Public Accounts, which position he resigned in 1854 to accept the agency of the Apalachicola Land Company. He was a member of the Florida Secession Convention in 1861, and supported the Confederacy during the Civil War. He was again appointed to the Comptroller's office in 1866.

In 1869 he was attacked by vertigo, from which combined with neuralgia he was a great sufferer until a few months before his death In all relations he maintained a spotless character for personal and official integrity. His first wife left two sons and three daughters, and by his second wife, who survived him, he had two sons and a daughter.
