= Hugh Archer (politician) =

American politician

1st Speaker of the Florida House of Representatives
- In office June 23, 1845 – July 26, 1845
- Succeeded by: Isaac Ferguson, Jr.

2nd & 4th Florida Comptroller
- In office August 26, 1845 – January 2, 1847
- Preceded by: Nathaniel P. Bemis
- Succeeded by: Nathaniel P. Bemis
- In office July 24, 1847 – December 28, 1847
- Preceded by: Nathaniel P. Bemis
- Succeeded by: Simon Towle

7th Speaker of the Florida House of Representatives
- In office November 25, 1850 – January 24, 1851
- Preceded by: Benjamin A. Putnam
- Succeeded by: Abraham K. Allison

Personal details
- Born: August 21. 1796
- Died: January 23, 1858
- Party: Whig

Hugh Archer (August 21, 1796 – January 23, 1858) was a politician in Florida. Archer settled in Leon County in the Florida Territory in the 1830s. Prior to Florida statehood, he represented Leon County in the Florida Legislative Council beginning in 1840 and was Chief Clerk of the House from 1842 to 1845. Upon statehood, he was the first Speaker of the Florida House of Representatives in 1845 but resigned later that year. From August 26, 1845, to January 2, 1847, and July 24, 1847, to December 28, 1847, he was Florida Comptroller. In 1850, he was again Speaker of the House. During his political career he was an ally of both David Levy Yulee and Thomas Brown.
