= Mariano D. Papy =

Floridian politician

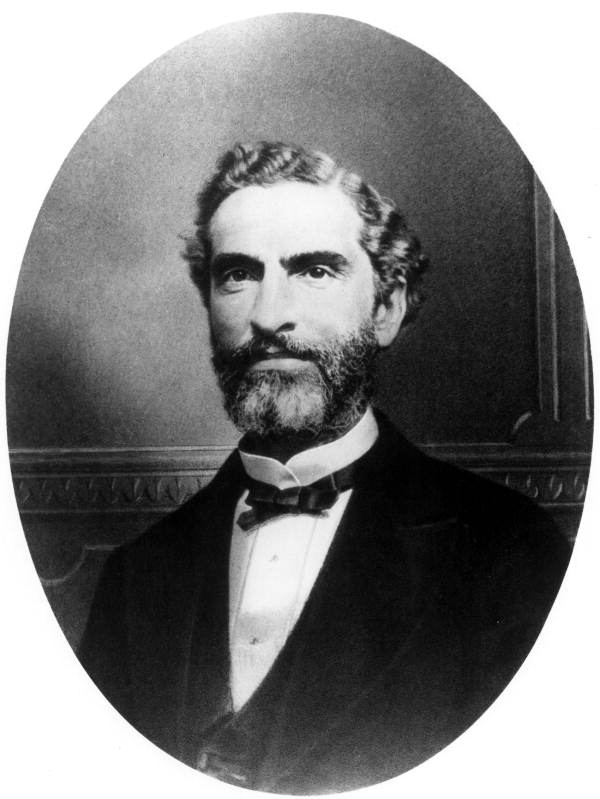

5th Florida Attorney General
- In office April 19, 1853 – March 2, 1861
- Governor: James E. Broome; Madison S. Perry
- Preceded by: David P. Hogue
- Succeeded by: John B. Galbraith

Member of the Florida House of Representatives from the Leon County district
- In office 1852–1852

1st Clerk of the Supreme Court of Florida
- In office 1845–1849
- Governor: William Dunn Moseley
- Preceded by: Office Established
- Succeeded by: Robert S. Hayward

Personal details
- Born: October 9, 1824 St. Augustine, Florida Territory
- Died: July 8, 1875 (aged 50) Tallahassee, Florida, U.S.
- Party: Democratic
- Occupation: Attorney

Mariano D. Papy (October 9, 1824 – July 8, 1875), also known as M. D. Papy, was an American planter, attorney, and politician from the state of Florida. Papy served as the 5th Florida Attorney General from 1853 to 1861.

== Early life ==
Papy was born on October 9, 1824, in the city of St. Augustine, the largest city in the Florida Territory at the time. Though he was born into a poor family, Papy taught himself how to read law. Additionally, he found wealth after an overseer helped him become a successful cotton planter. In 1840, Papy, known for his memory and perceptiveness, was admitted into the Florida Territorial Bar by order of the Florida Territorial Legislative Council despite only being 16.

== Political career ==
When Florida received statehood in 1845, Papy, a Democrat, was named the first Clerk of the Florida Supreme Court by Governor William Dunn Moseley. He served in this position until 1849, when he returned to private practice. In 1852, he represented Leon County for a single year in the Florida House of Representatives. The following year, Papy was elected to be the fifth Florida Attorney General. He would serve two terms, opting not to run for a third term due to the onset of the American Civil War.

During the Civil War, many pro-secessionists in Florida became increasingly critical of the worsening economy under Governor John Milton. On January 14, 1862, the Florida Secession Convention reconvened and voted to create an executive council to assist the governor. Papy was appointed to the council of four, serving alongside planter Smith Simkins of Jefferson County, James A. Wiggins of Marion County, and W. D. Barnes of Jackson County. Though initially subservient to Milton, the council helped his leadership demonstrate more foresight.

Papy retired to private practice after the end of the war.

== Death and burial ==
Though seemingly healthy, Papy died in Tallahassee, Florida on July 8, 1875. He is buried in Tallahassee's Old City Cemetery.

== See also ==
- Bernie Papy
