= Alto Adams =

American judge (1899–1988)

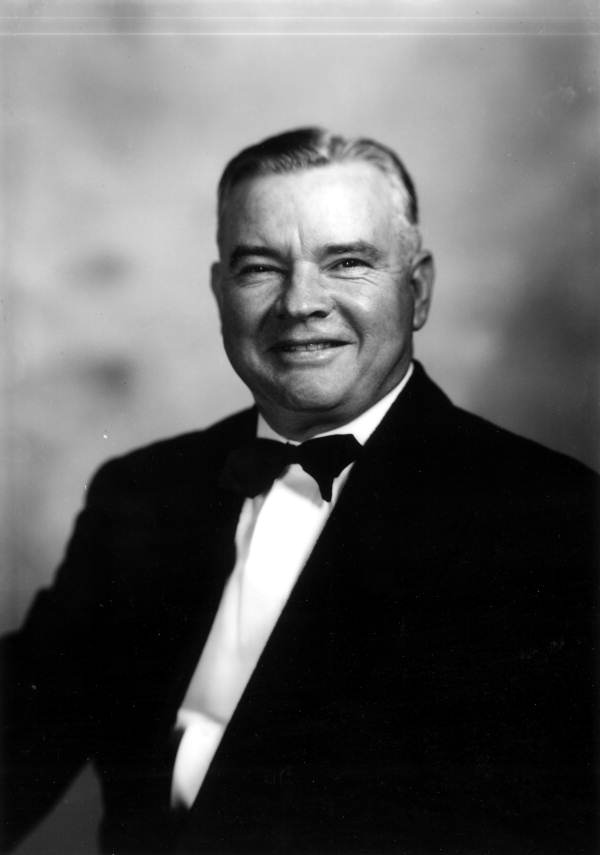
- Adams in 1947

Chief Justice of the Florida Supreme Court
- In office January 1949 – January 1951

Justice of the Florida Supreme Court
- In office November 25, 1940 – October 22, 1951
- Appointed by: Fred P. Cone
- Preceded by: Seat established
- Succeeded by: John Mathews
- In office November 13, 1967 – August 1, 1968
- Appointed by: Claude R. Kirk
- Preceded by: Stephen C. O'Connell
- Succeeded by: Wade L. Hopping

Personal details
- Born: Alto Lee Adams; January 31, 1899 Walton County, Florida, U.S.
- Died: February 20, 1988 (aged 89)
- Spouse: Carra Williams

Alto Lee Adams Sr. (January 31, 1899 – February 20, 1988) was an American judge. He was a justice for the Florida Supreme Court between 1940 and 1951. From 1949 to 1951 Adams served as chief justice.

== Biography ==
Born and raised in Walton County, Florida, near DeFuniak Springs.

=== Law career ===
Adams graduated from the University of Florida College of Law in 1921. While at the University of Florida, he was member of Alpha Phi Epsilon and Florida Blue Key. He also was named a Designated Distinguished Alumnus in 1974. After gaining admission to the bar, Adams "moved to Ft. Pierce to practice law".

=== Supreme Court ===
In 1936, he campaigned for the election of Fred P. Cone as Governor of Florida, "and was rewarded for his support by an appointment to the circuit bench in 1938 and to the supreme court in 1940". In 1940, the Florida Constitution was amended to add a seventh Justice to the Florida Supreme Court, the seat to which Governor Cone appointed Adams. Adams served on the court until 1951, when he resigned to undertake an unsuccessful campaign for governor.

In 1967, Governor Claude R. Kirk appointed Adams as an interim justice to fill a vacancy created by the resignation of Stephen C. O'Connell. Kirk had initially attempted to appoint Wade L. Hopping, but Hopping was declared ineligible, not having been a member of the Florida Bar for the requisite ten-year period. Adams served until Hopping met the eligibility requirements in late 1968.

=== Federal Courthouse ===
In September 2009, legislation was introduced in the US Congress to name the federal courthouse in Fort Pierce, Florida after Adams. This legislation was passed in 2012.

Political offices
| Preceded by Newly created seat | Justice of the Florida Supreme Court; 1940–1951 | Succeeded by John Mathews |
