= John E. Mathews Jr. =

American lawyer (died 1988)

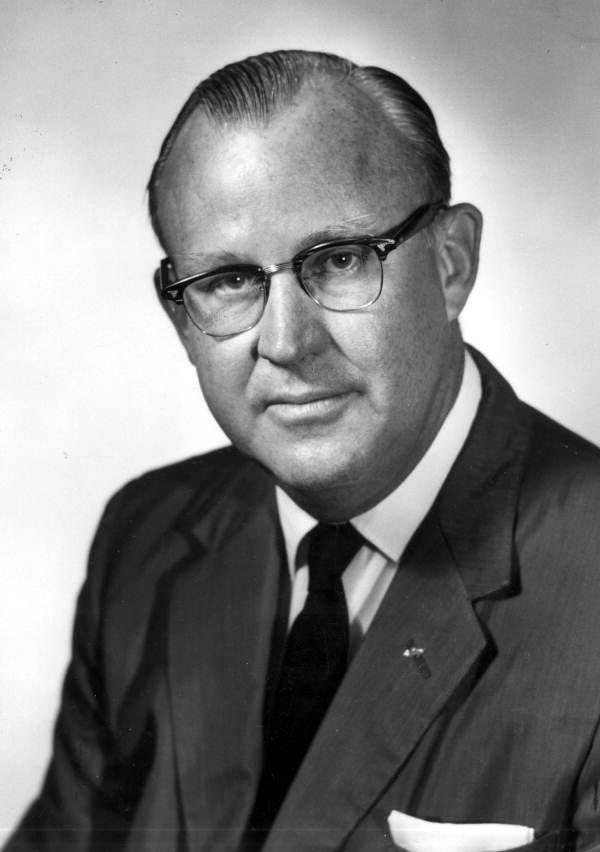

John E. Mathews Jr. (died 1988) was an American lawyer and politician from Florida, who served in the Florida Senate including as President of the Florida Senate. He ran for governor twice. A photograph of him in 1963 is held by the Florida Archives. A member of the Democratic Party, he represented Duval County in the Florida House of Representatives from 1957 until 1962 and in the Florida Senate from 1962 to 1970.

== Career ==
Mathews lived in Jacksonville. He ran for governor in 1964 and 1970. He was the son of judge John Mathews, a Florida judge and state legislator. He served on Florida's Constitutional Revision Commission of 1977–78.

== Personal life ==
He married and had two children.
