= William W. Moore =

American politician

William Wyatt Moore (born c. 1832) was a Florida politician.

Moore was born in Florida and worked as a printer. Moore, a Republican "scalawag", represented Columbia County, Florida in the Florida House of Representatives from 1868 to 1870 and served as Speaker of the Florida House of Representatives for the 1868 session. In 1873 he was postmaster of Lake City, Florida.

He chaired the Committee of the Assembly on Enrolled Bills.

In 1879 he started the Florida Telegraph which he sold to I.C Webb in 1887. The newspaper later went on to be renamed the Bradford County Telegraph, and is still published to this day(March 2024).
