= Samuel B. Love =

American politician

Samuel B. Love was a politician in Florida. He represented Gadsden in the Florida House of Representatives as a Democrat in 1860 and 1861. The latter year, he was unanimously elected Speaker of the Florida House of Representatives thanks to the nomination of William D. Bloxham. He was an officer in the state militia during the American Civil War and later served as mayor of Quincy, Florida.

Love was the son of John C. Love, who served in the Florida Legislative Council representing the 6th district in 1828 and Gadsden County, Florida in 1829, 1832, and 1835.

In the American Civil War, he was a captain in the 6th Florida Infantry and later a colonel in the militia. He was mayor of Quincy, Florida from 1858 to 1859 and 1864 to 1868. He was a member of the Gadsden County school board from 1871 to 1873.
