= Thomas D. Beasley =

Florida politician

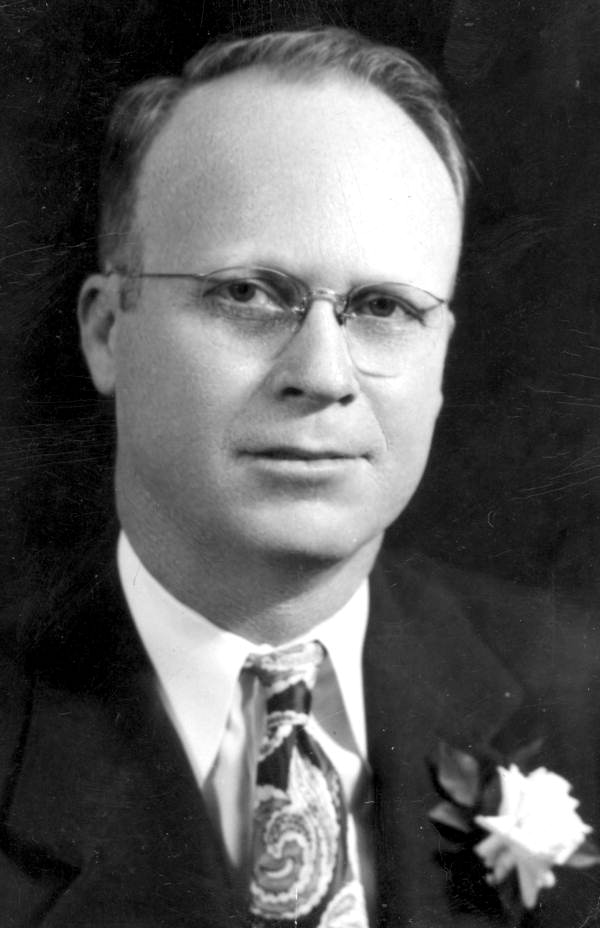

Thomas Dekalb Beasley (1904–1988) was a politician in Florida. He served several terms and was a Speaker of the Florida House of Representatives. He was a Democrat and represented Walton County, Florida.

He spoke on financial support for elderly Floridians.
