= Samuel W. Getzen =

American lawyer and politician

Member of the Florida Senate from the 38th district
- In office 1931–1935
- Preceded by: Jesse M. Mitchell
- Succeeded by: Fred L Touchton

Speaker of the Florida House of Representatives
- In office 1929–1931
- Preceded by: Fred Henry Davis
- Succeeded by: E. Clay Lewis Jr.

Member of the Florida House of Representatives from the Sumter district
- In office 1923–1931

Personal details
- Born: February 13, 1898 Lake City, Florida, U.S.
- Died: April 11, 1960 (aged 62) Alachua County, Florida, U.S.
- Party: Democrat
- Spouse: Josephine Brooks (1902–1995) (m. 1921–1960)

Samuel Wyche Getzen (February 13, 1898 – April 11, 1960) was an American lawyer and politician.

Samuel Wyche Getzen was born on February 13, 1898, in Lake City, Florida, the son of James Culbreath Getzen (1866–1937), a farmer and naval stores operator, and Willie Florence née Thompson (1869–1955). He grew up in Sumter County, Florida, attending Columbia College and the University of Florida. He married Josephine Brooks (1902–1995) in 1921.

He was first elected to the Florida House of Representatives at the age of 23, and was re-elected through 1929, when he served as Speaker of the House. In 1929, he was part of a lobbying investigation by the U.S. Congress. From 1931 to 1933, he served in the Florida Senate, representing the 38th District. He returned to the House of Representatives in 1935.

Getzen died April 11, 1960, at the age of 62 in Alachua County, Florida.
