= Fuller Warren =

American politician

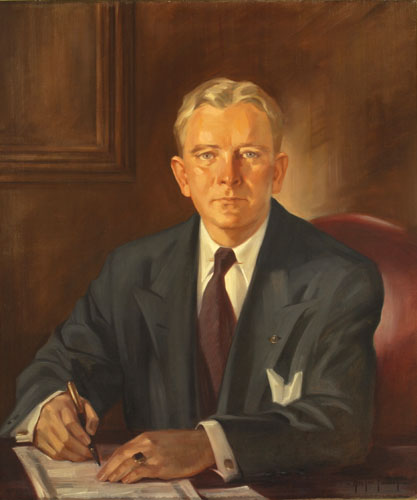

30th Governor of Florida
- In office January 4, 1949 – January 6, 1953
- Preceded by: Millard Caldwell
- Succeeded by: Daniel T. McCarty

Member of the Florida House of Representatives
- In office 1928–1930, 1940–1942

Member of the Jacksonville City Council
- In office 1931–1937

Personal details
- Born: October 3, 1905 Blountstown, Florida, U.S.
- Died: September 23, 1973 (aged 67) Miami, Florida, U.S.
- Party: Democratic
- Spouses: Sallie Mae Stegall (m. 1929; div. 1937) Pat Pacetti (m. 1939; div. 1942) Barbara Manning (m. 1949; div. 1959)
- Children: 1 (with Sallie); 4 (with Pat); 4 (with Barbara)
- Profession: Lawyer

Military service
- Allegiance: United States
- Branch/service: United States Navy
- Battles/wars: World War II

Fuller Warren (October 3, 1905 – September 23, 1973) was an American attorney and politician who served as the 30th governor of Florida from 1949 until January 1953.

According to one observer, Warren came from “a populist and pro-Roosevelt tradition.”

== Early life and education ==
Born in Blountstown, Florida, he attended the University of Florida in Gainesville. While at the university he was one of the early members of Florida Blue Key, as well as the Tau chapter of Theta Chi fraternity. While still attending the university, he was elected in 1927 at the age of 21 to the Florida House of Representatives.

== Legal career and early politics ==
Following graduation, he moved to Jacksonville, where he began practicing law. He served on the city council from 1931 until 1937; he was elected and returned to the Florida House in 1939. During World War II, he was a gunnery officer in the U.S. Navy.

== Term as governor ==
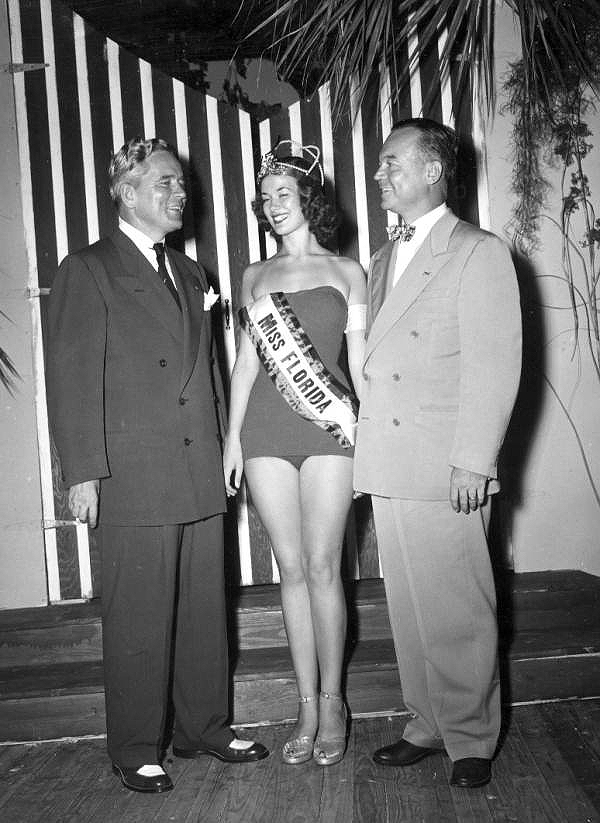
With Rosemary Carpenter, the winner of the 1948 Miss Florida Beauty Pageant, and Zack Mosley in 1948

Warren was nominated for governor by the Democratic Party in 1948; his platform included promises to fight racism in Florida. In addition to having to deal with racial segregation, most blacks were still disenfranchised and cut out of the official political system. Warren won the election and assumed the office of governor on January 4, 1949.

After his election, he spoke out against the Ku Klux Klan, stating after a rally in January 1949 that

The hooded hoodlums and sheeted jerks who paraded the streets of Tallahassee last night made a disgusting and alarming spectacle. These covered cowards who call themselves Klansmen quite obviously have set out to terrorize minority groups in Florida as they have in a near-by state.

In March 1949, reports were published that Warren had been a member of the Klan. He issued a statement saying that he had been a member before World War II, but during it he had "helped to fight a war to destroy the Nazis — first cousins to Klansmen."

During his term, Warren set the foundations for the state's turnpike system, began the Florida reforestation program, instituted quality control programs on Florida's citrus crops, and signed a law that forbade cattle from wandering freely (as they damaged crops). In 1951 Warren signed an anti-Klan law which, although not mentioning the Klan specifically, forbade the wearing of masks in public or on the private property of another person without the written permission of the owner.

The hearings of the United States Senate Special Committee to Investigate Crime in Interstate Commerce, chaired by Senator Estes Kefauver, brought to light the involvement of Florida public officials in gambling-related corruption involving numbers games and bolita. There were accusations that Warren's 1948 campaign had been funded by organized criminals. Warren refused to cooperate with the committee, claiming that to do so would contradict the principle of States' rights. In a letter to Senator Herbert O'Conor, in which Warren informed the committee that he would not appear before them, he stated: "I think state sovereignty as conceived by the founders of our Government is something more than a fading memory to rest in the nation's archives."

In 1951, legislator George S Okell, in the Florida House of Representatives introduced a resolution to impeach Warren for "wilfully ignoring" his duty to eliminate illegal gambling in Florida and for falsifying papers related to his 1948 campaign. The House voted on May 28, 1951, to reject the articles of impeachment.

== Later years ==
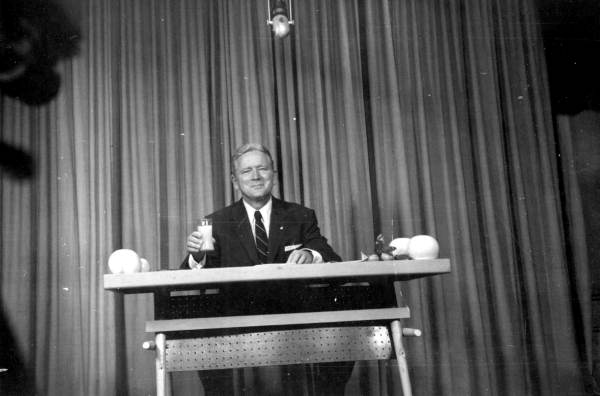
Fuller Warren holding a glass of orange juice while hosting his weekly WITV television program in 1955.

After Warren left office on January 6, 1953, he moved to Miami, where he practiced law. Early in 1954, Warren joined WITV (channel 17), Miami's second television station and the city's first UHF station, as a political analyst and news commentator. A review of his weekly program in the Miami News began with, "those melisonant [sic] vibrations dripping from WITV's transmitter each Sunday should send fear into the hearts of every news commentator across the nations." He ran for governor again in 1956, promising "to maintain segregation in Florida" but lost the election to opponent LeRoy Collins.

Warren died in Miami in 1973.

== Legacy and honors ==
- The Fuller Warren Bridge in Jacksonville is named for him.

Party political offices
| Preceded by Millard Caldwell | Democratic nominee for Governor of Florida; 1948 | Succeeded by Daniel T. McCarty |
Political offices
| Preceded by Millard F. Caldwell | Governor of Florida; 1949–1953 | Succeeded by Daniel T. McCarty |
