= William A. Washburne Jr. =

American politician

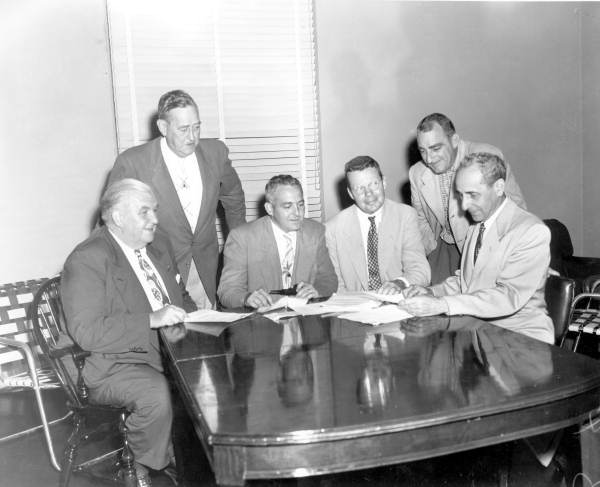
- Washburne (left) with J. Frank Houghton, Donald C. McLaren, Fred C. Petersen, Henry S. Bartholomew and B. E. Shaffer, 1953

Member of the Florida House of Representatives from Sarasota County
- In office 1953

Personal details
- Died: March 24, 1974 (aged 76)
- Party: Republican

William A. Washburne Jr. (died March 24, 1974) was an American politician. He served as a Republican member of the Florida House of Representatives.

== Life and career ==
Before moving to Florida in 1947 Washburne lived in White Plains, New York and worked as an executive for the Gulf Oil company.

Washburne was a campaign manager for the GOP in 1952. Washburne served in the Florida House of Representatives in 1953. In 1956, Washburne was the Republican candidate for governor of Florida losing to Leroy Collins. Washburne died March 24, 1974, at the age of 76 in Bay Pines hospital.
