= C. Farris Bryant =

34th Governor of Florida

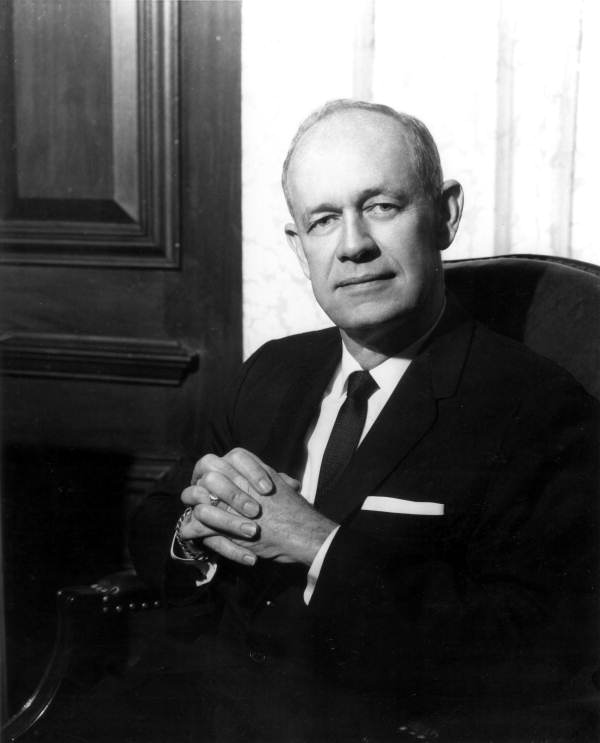

Director of the Office of Emergency Planning
- In office March 23, 1966 – October 9, 1967
- President: Lyndon B. Johnson
- Preceded by: Buford Ellington
- Succeeded by: Price Daniel

34th Governor of Florida
- In office January 3, 1961 – January 5, 1965
- Preceded by: LeRoy Collins
- Succeeded by: W. Haydon Burns

Speaker of the Florida House of Representatives
- In office 1953–1954
- Preceded by: Elmer B. Elliott
- Succeeded by: Thomas E. David

Personal details
- Born: Cecil Farris Bryant; July 26, 1914 Marion County, Florida, U.S.
- Died: March 1, 2002 (aged 87) Jacksonville, Florida, U.S.
- Party: Democratic
- Spouse: Julia Burnett
- Education: Emory University (attended); University of Florida (BA); Harvard University (LLB)

Military service
- Allegiance: United States
- Branch/service: United States Navy
- Years of service: 1942–1945
- Battles/wars: World War II

Cecil Farris Bryant (July 26, 1914 – March 1, 2002) was an American conservative politician serving as the 34th governor of Florida. He also served on the United States National Security Council as director of the Office of Emergency Planning during the administration of President Lyndon B. Johnson, who also appointed Bryant chair of the U.S. Advisory Commission on Intergovernmental Relations.

== Early life and career ==
Bryant was born in Ocala, Marion County, Florida, to Charles Cecil Bryant and Lela Margaret (Farris) Bryant. His paternal grandparents, William Robert Bryant and Amy Emma (Lantz) Bryant, moved to Marion County from Missouri in 1890. Lela Margaret Bryant was the daughter of Oscar A. and Marry M. Farris of Ocala and the sister of Ion Farris, who became a prominent Florida legislator and an unsuccessful gubernatorial candidate in 1916. His mother hoped Farris would follow her brother into politics and succeed to become the governor of Florida. According to Bryant, on the day he was born, his mother “had my father hold me up and she said, hello, governor.” His mother, Bryant said, was the force behind his decision to enter politics.

After graduating from Ocala High School, Bryant attended Emory University in Atlanta, Georgia, from 1931 to 1932. He pledged Alpha Tau Omega (ATO). Bryant later utilized the ATO social network to help his political campaigns and had ATO brothers on his staff as governor. He completed his undergraduate studies at the University of Florida in Gainesville in 1935 with a business degree. There he was a member of Florida Blue Key, Alpha Tau Omega fraternity, and the Alpha Kappa Psi business fraternity. Bryant continued his education at Harvard University in Cambridge, Massachusetts, where he earned a law degree in 1938.

In 1939, unable to find a decent salaried position in a law office, Bryant took a job as an auditor with the office of the Florida comptroller in Tallahassee. It was in Tallahassee that Bryant met his future wife, Julia Burnett. Born on April 26, 1918, in Madison, Florida, Julia was the daughter of Daniel Felix Burnett Jr. and Eunice Lovett Burnett. She attended and graduated from the Florida State College for Women in Tallahassee. Julia was teaching in Tallahassee when she met Farris Bryant. He proposed on their first date; she accepted on their third. They married on September 18, 1940, in Madison and made their home in Ocala. She and Farris had three children, all daughters: Julie, Cecilia, and Adair. Julia played a key role in assisting Farris in his political campaigns and as the first lady of Florida during his governorship. They were married for fifty-six years until her death in 1996.

As the United States prepared for the possibility of war in 1941, Bryant joined the newly formed Florida State Guard. Soon after the United States entered World War II, he volunteered to join the U.S. Navy. In May 1942, Bryant won election to represent Marion County in the Florida House of Representatives. However, he gave up his seat to stay in the Navy. Bryant was commissioned as an ensign and served as a gunnery officer on oil tankers and Liberty ships in the North Atlantic and the Mediterranean in 1943. In 1944, he was transferred to serve aboard a destroyer doing convoy escort duty. Bryant later served in the Pacific against the Japanese. He ended his service as a lieutenant in 1945. Bryant later joined the American Legion and the Veterans of Foreign Wars.

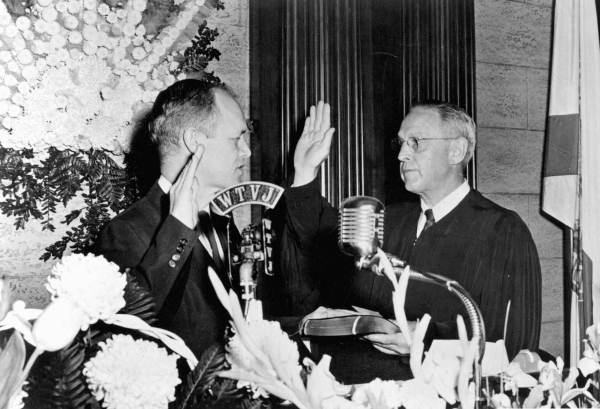
Farris Bryant being sworn in as Speaker of the Florida House of Representatives, 1953

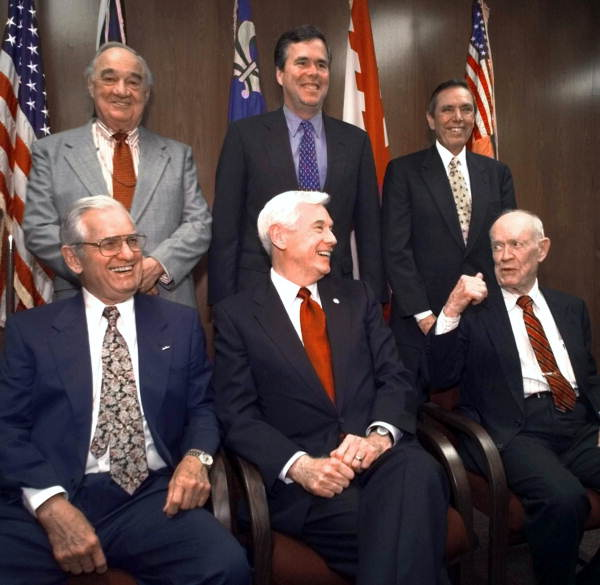
Bryant with other Florida Governors in 2000

== Florida House of Representatives ==
When he returned from the war in 1945, Bryant was determined to regain the Florida House seat that he had given up after joining the Navy. He won election in 1946 and served his first session in the Florida Legislature in 1947 (the legislature had biennial sessions). Bryant served in the Florida House for five more sessions; his last session was in 1957. He sponsored, cosponsored, and supported legislation that led to the expansion of the state's junior college system, the creation of Florida's Turnpike, centralization of state purchasing, and the establishment of the Minimum Foundation Program, which ensured that even the poorest school districts could provide a decent, foundational education for children. And he led the effort to establish the Florida Legislative Council, a research body designed to report on the pros and cons of potential legislation while the legislature was out of session. He was conservative on fiscal matters, supporting economy in government. Influenced by his Methodist faith, Bryant was also conservative on many social issues and supported legislation to limit gambling in the state. His legislative prominence led to his election as speaker of the Florida House of Representatives in 1953. Bryant had fond memories of his time in the Florida House: "I had more fun in those ten years in the political world than I had at any other time."

== Gubernatorial campaigns ==
=== 1956 ===
After being elected speaker of the Florida House of Representatives, Bryant was determined to run for governor in 1956. His opponents in the Democratic primary were the sitting governor, LeRoy Collins, former governor Fuller Warren, and wealthy businessman and former National Guard general Sumter Lowry. Bryant hoped to win based on his legislative experience, his advocacy of responsible and restrained government spending, and his support for revision of the Florida Constitution. Governor Collins ran on a similar platform, and both men appealed to Florida's growing business sector. However, the issue of racial integration overshadowed all other issues in the Democratic primary. Governor Collins believed Florida had to follow federal law and accept the US Supreme Court's 1954 decision in Brown v. Board of Education that ruled segregation in public education was inherently unequal and its subsequent decision (Brown II) that the states must move to implement integration in their public schools. He and Bryant insisted that integration should be through lawful means, not through rebellion and violence. Bryant said the question of integration must be approached '"with cool heads, clear minds, and a keen concern for the welfare of all Floridians, black and white."' Sumter Lowry ran as a staunch defender of segregation and opposed any compromise with integration brought on by the Brown decision. He attacked integration as a Communist-backed conspiracy to destroy the white race in America. Lowry accused Collins and Bryant of being soft on segregation and unwilling to defend states' rights against federal intrusion. Early on in his campaign, Bryant stated that he did not believe Florida was ready for racial integration: '“In the homes of Negroes we find different intellectual levels, and moral and sanitary standards. Negroes have come very far in these past 100 years but not as far as they will go in their next 100. I feel that it would not be good for two groups with such different standards to be drawn into direct contact.”’ He hoped that by making his position clear on integration he could move on to campaign on the government reform and pro-growth agenda that he preferred to discuss. However, Lowry's uncompromising segregationist platform won support among many Florida Democrats, and he soon became the main challenger to Collins, leaving Bryant and Warren behind. Bryant came in third in the primary. Governor Collins went on to win reelection.

=== 1960 ===
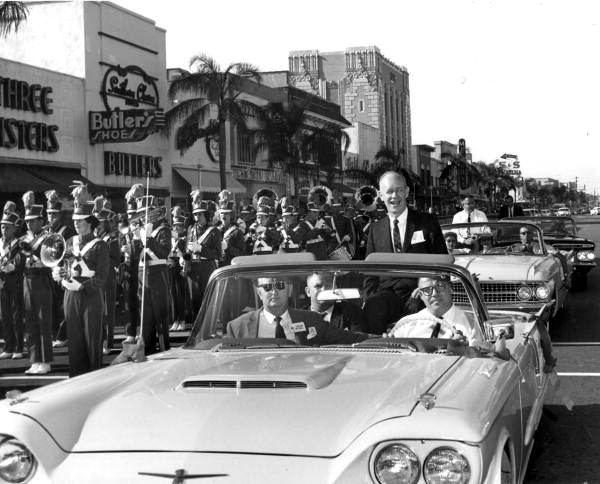
Democratic gubernatorial candidate Farris Bryant in lead car during a parade in Daytona Beach, 1960

Four years after his loss in 1956, Bryant was the clear front runner in the Democratic race for governor in 1960. He recognized that two of the main reasons for his defeat in 1956 were poor fundraising and lack of a statewide campaign organization. By the time he entered the race in 1960, Bryant had the best funded and best organized campaign in the field of ten candidates in the Democratic primary. After garnering the most votes in the initial primary, Bryant faced a runoff against Doyle E. Carlton Jr., the son of former Florida governor Doyle E. Carlton. Integration was the dominant issue of the runoff election. Both candidates supported segregation and opposed further integration of Florida's public schools; however, both men emphasized that opposition to integration must be non-violent and orderly. Carlton was an ally of Governor LeRoy Collins, whose willingness to support gradual integration became a liability for Carlton in 1960. Bryant made effective use of television, radio, and newspapers to call into question Carlton's support for segregation while at the same time extolling his own experience and expertise as a legislator and government leader, who proposed a reform agenda of constitutional revision, reapportionment, fiscal restraint, and modernization in education and transportation. His campaign slogan, "It's Time for Bryant," saturated the airwaves. White opposition to Civil Rights protests in Florida (in Tallahassee) helped him win the election in 1960. When the polls closed on May 24, 1960, Bryant won a convincing victory. He went on to defeat Republican George C. Peterson in November.

== Governorship ==
=== Inauguration ===
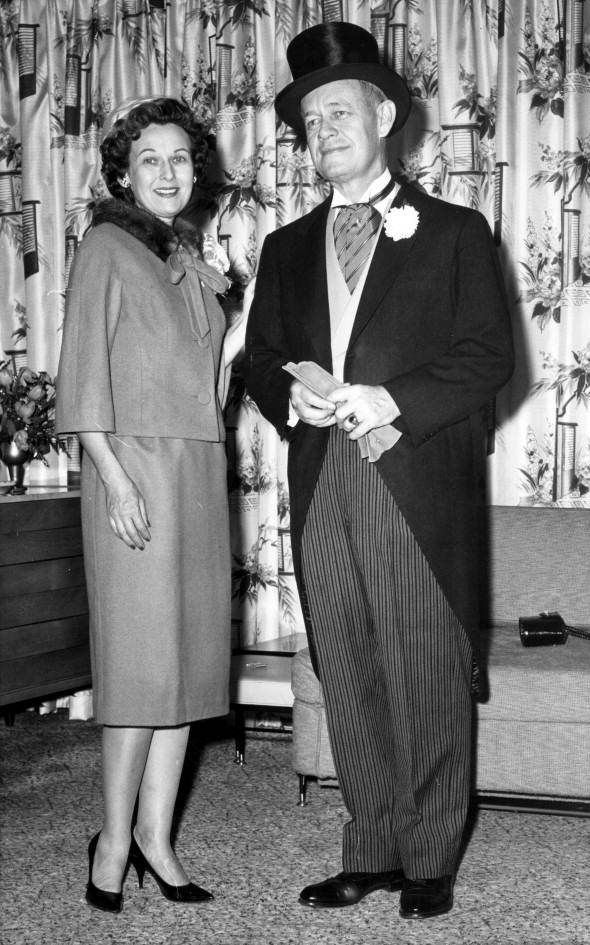
Governor Bryant and Florida First Lady Julia Bryant on Inauguration Day

C. Farris Bryant took the oath of office on January 3, 1961. In his inaugural address, Governor Bryant called for unity in the state and an end to political factionalism in the Florida Legislature. He said the people of Florida should expect his term of office to be an administration of the highest standards in its work, morality, and achievements. Bryant called for improvement in education, the hiring of the most qualified people for state positions, cleaning out corruption in the State Road Department, reapportionment, more efficient tax collection, and a minimum level of dignified subsistence for all Floridians. Alluding to how he would handle integration, Bryant insisted that his administration would not interfere in issues “best left in the hands of local officials,” and he would “oppose with vigor any efforts by the federal government to usurp the proper and lawful prerogatives of the state.”

=== Roads ===
Bryant believed the state had to invest in infrastructure to handle the needs of its ever-growing population and to encourage more tourism, which would mean more revenue through the sales tax. A supporter of Florida's Turnpike (then known as the Sunshine State Parkway) since its inception in 1955, Bryant approved a new bond issue to complete the turnpike by extending it from Fort Pierce on the Atlantic to Wildwood in Sumter County in central Florida. The extension was completed in 1964, during the last months of his administration. Other road building initiatives during the Bryant years included the improvement and completion of US Highway 1, running along Florida's Atlantic coast from the Georgia border to Key West; the extension of I-10 to Lake City and progress on the extension of I-75 north of Lake City to Tampa; the completion of I-4 from the Tampa/St. Petersburg area across the state to Daytona Beach on the Atlantic; and the beginning of construction of the Everglades Parkway or “Alligator Alley” from Naples on the Gulf coast to Fort Lauderdale north of Miami.

=== Cross Florida Barge Canal ===
Since the territorial days, Florida governors had dreamed of building a canal across the state as a way of improving the economy, expanding settlement, and increasing revenue. Governor Bryant had long supported the construction of what became known as the Cross Florida Barge Canal. Plans called for the canal to cut through the peninsula from Palatka on the St. Johns River to Yankeetown on the Gulf of Mexico. Barges would be able to cross the state from Jacksonville to the Gulf and from the Gulf to the Atlantic. Proponents like Bryant believed that the canal would be a major inducement for investment in the state and a further way to meet the growth demands of Florida's burgeoning population. During the 1960 presidential campaign, John F. Kennedy promised that his presidency would fund construction of the canal. President Kennedy requested money from Congress for initial building costs. After the Cuban Missile Crisis of October 1962, Bryant and other canal supporters argued that the canal would be vital to the defense of the United States; shipping could pass safely through the canal without having to go near Cuba and the threat from Soviet submarines and warplanes. The canal, supporters claimed, would be the perfect highway to safely transport rockets and related material to what would become the National Aeronautics and Space Administration's (NASA) Kennedy Space Center at Cape Canaveral. In June 1961, the governor testified in Congress about the benefits of the canal, including flood control in an area of the state that had seen massive flood damage over the decades. However, it was not until December 1963, during the first month of the administration of President Lyndon B. Johnson, that federal money started to flow to the canal project. President Johnson wanted to ensure that he would carry Florida in the 1964 presidential election. He was present with Governor Bryant for the groundbreaking ceremony for the canal at Palatka on February 27, 1964. With this promising beginning, it looked like the canal would be realized. Unfortunately for Bryant, by the end of the 1960s, increased concern about the environmental damage the canal posed to the Ocklawaha River and other waterways and the massive cost of the project led to the eventual demise of the canal. Until the end of his life, Bryant defended the canal and believed the failure to complete it was a great loss to the state.

=== Education ===
One of the biggest impacts of the Bryant administration on the state was in the area of education. Bryant created the Committee on Quality Education in 1961. A year later, he launched the First Governors Conference on Higher Education. Outcomes from the recommendation of these committees, other experts, and the governor's own study of the issues, resulted in many changes. In primary education, there was improvement in teacher certification, recruitment of instructors, promotion of vocational training, and the use of libraries and guidance services, among other initiatives. The most consequential educational reforms, however, were in higher education. He received legislative support to increase salaries for university faculty, funded more junior colleges, improved continuing education with the Florida Institute for Continuing University Studies, instituted year-round education in Florida's state universities, secured funds for the construction of what would become the University of West Florida in Pensacola, realized the finishing and opening of Florida Atlantic University in 1964, pushed for the creation of the future University of Central Florida, and funded several new buildings for existing Florida universities. Bryant funded this massive educational building program through a bond initiative that would raise the funds necessary for long-term building projects while paying off the bond debt through the state tax on utilities.

=== Promoting Florida ===
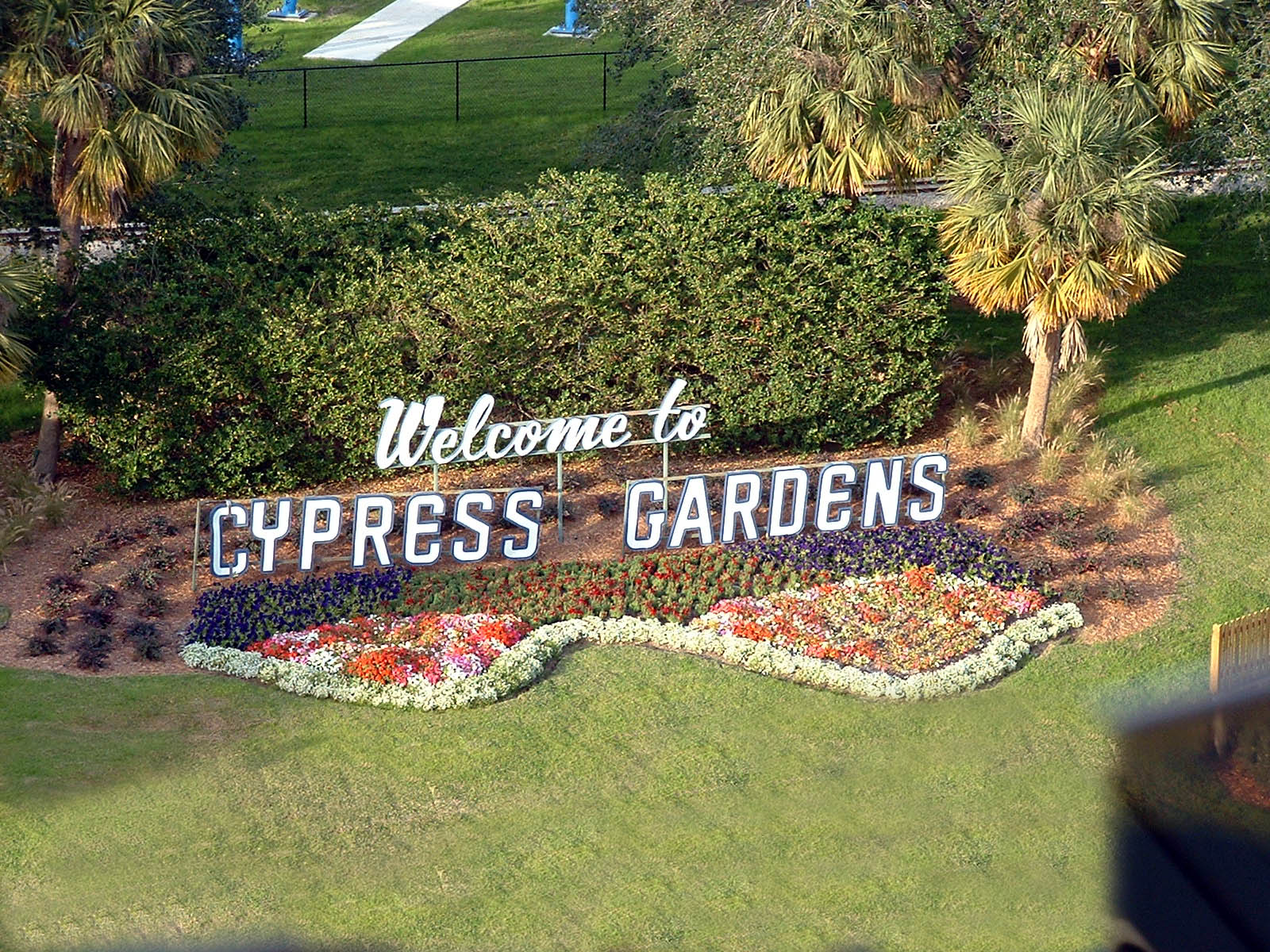
Cypress Gardens, Florida

Governor Bryant devoted much of his time in office to promoting the virtues of visiting, doing business, and living in Florida. As he did during his campaign for governor in 1960, he used radio and television to promote Florida, especially its citrus industry. As governor-elect in December 1960, he led a delegation to South America to encourage mutual investment and tourism between Florida and that continent. In October 1961, he took his family to Europe to vacation and promote Florida tourism. Bryant, an avid pilot and flyer, flew around the state and country to meet with business and governmental leaders to talk about investing in Florida. The governor increased the number of state parks and promoted historical sites such as San Marcos de Apalache south of Tallahassee. He made sure Florida was represented at the 1964 New York World's Fair. Bryant took pride in the fact that NASA used Cape Canaveral as its launch site for crewed space missions and pointed to this development as a sign that Florida was leading the nation into space.

=== The Cold War and Cuba ===
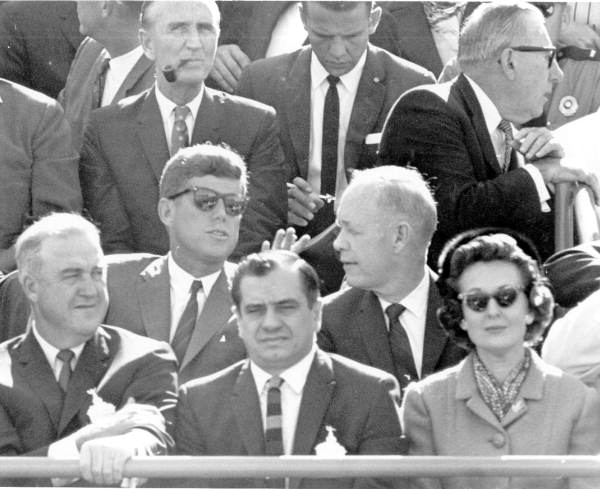
President John F. Kennedy talks with Governor Bryant at the Orange Bowl in Miami, January 1963. Behind Kennedy and Bryant are Senator Mike Mansfield (with pipe) and Florida congressman Claude Pepper (turning). Sitting in front of Kennedy (L-R): Grant Stockdale, U.S. Ambassador to Ireland, Congressman Dante Fascell, and Florida First Lady Julia Bryant.

Bryant entered the governorship in January 1961, only two years after Fidel Castro's revolutionary forces came to power in Cuba. An ardent opponent of Communism and the Soviet Union since his early days in the legislature, Bryant favored a firm national policy against the Soviet-supported Castro government and pushed to implement civil defense measures in case of war between Soviet Union and the United States. As evidence of Soviet military aid to Cuba grew, Governor Bryant called for the United States to do whatever was necessary to end the Castro regime. A month before the Cuban Missile Crisis, he spoke about his support for a military blockade of Cuba and even an invasion of the island. The governor believed that only the downfall of the Cuban government would end the flow of Cuban refugees to Florida—a situation that he constantly asked the Kennedy administration to relieve. At the same time, he worried about the economic impact the Cuban crisis was having on Florida, especially in south Florida in the days following the Cuban Missile Crisis, when he tried to assure Americans and the world that Florida was safe for tourists. During the missile crisis, he fully backed President Kennedy's actions towards Cuba and the Soviet missiles; however, in private, he urged the president to invade Cuba and end the Castro regime. Governor Bryant called out the Florida National Guard, including its air arm, to back up the US military presence in Florida, addressed Floridians about the crisis on the radio, and rushed to strengthen civil defense measures. Bryant remained a Cold warrior after the missile crisis, supporting the Johnson and Nixon policies in Vietnam and endorsing an aggressive stand against Communism wherever it was in power. He supported the requirement that all Florida high school students had to pass a course in Americanism versus Communism before graduation. In 1963, Bryant created the Florida Center for Cold War Education, an institute designed to promote patriotism and to educate Floridians on the threats posed by Communist ideas and countries.

=== Segregation and civil rights ===
As a north central Florida politician from a small town, Farris Bryant grew up in a world where whites and blacks were not supposed to question the dominance of whites in a firmly segregated society. As an ambitious politician with a conservative view of life, Bryant, although he never endorsed violence, never questioned the segregation system in public. He, like almost all Florida lawmakers during his time in the Florida Legislature, opposed the Brown decision with its federal call for the integration of the nation's schools. After seeing the political price his old rival LeRoy Collins paid for his eventual willingness to implement integration in Florida's public schools, Bryant, after losing the governor's race in 1956, was determined to uphold segregation when he ran for governor in 1960. He led the effort in the Florida House of Representatives to successfully pass an interposition resolution in opposition to the Brown decision. However, after winning the 1960 gubernatorial race, he preferred to downplay the race issue. Bryant allowed the integration of Florida's public schools begun under Governor Collins to continue.

When it came to calls for integration and civil rights beyond Florida's court ordered integration of public schools, Bryant remained opposed to what he said was a threat to law and order. He did not call for the use of state law enforcement in the bloody repression of civil rights demonstrators as seen in some other southern states, preferring to let local authorities deal with protestors and their racist attackers. In the summer of 1961, Freedom Riders drove across Florida from Pensacola to Jacksonville. Governor Bryant ordered the Florida Highway Patrol to make sure that restaurants, rest stops, and bus terminals along the route did not refuse the riders service. If they did not want to provide service, they were supposed to close, but not protest. There were a couple of violent incidents in Tallahassee, but the Freedom Riders’ journey across Florida was mostly untroubled.

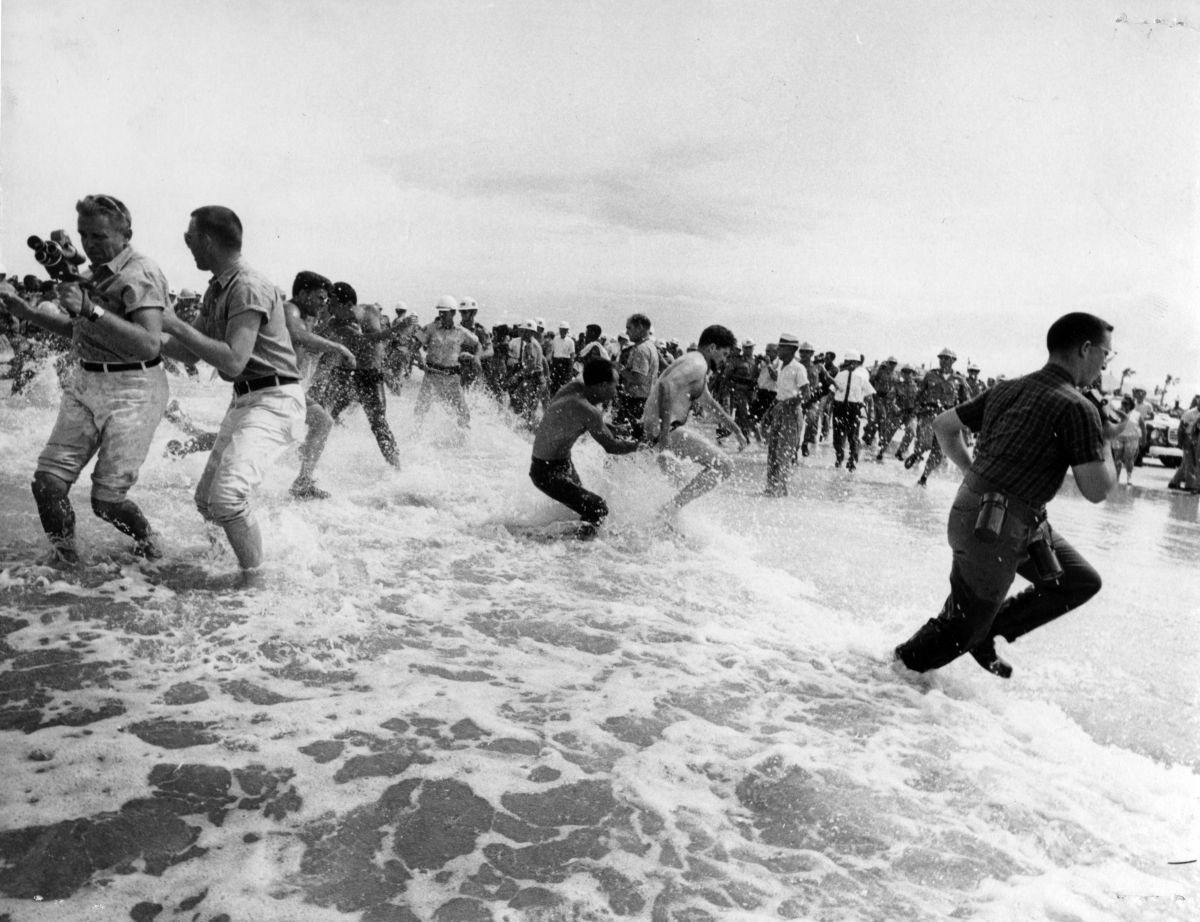
Segregationists trying to prevent African Americans from swimming at a "White Only" Beach in St. Augustine, June 25, 1964

As a result of the St. Augustine movement, in the summer of 1963, African American demonstrators, and allies launched sit-in demonstrations at white owned establishments in St. Augustine, Florida, and marched for civil rights. The violent clashes between whites and the demonstrators were eventually contained and died down but resumed in greater force in the spring of 1964, as the state and city planned events celebrating the city's upcoming 400th anniversary of its founding in 1965. Local police arrested demonstrators and white militants attacked marchers and hounded blacks going about their daily business. Civil rights leader Martin Luther King Jr. called for massive demonstrations in the city. St. Augustine quickly received national attention as the new battlefield in the civil rights struggle. King arrived in the city to direct and support the demonstrators while a number out of state racists, including the notorious Georgia Klansman J. B. Stoner, came to the scene to encourage the racist attackers. Governor Bryant initially failed to stem the violence. He called in too few state troopers to intervene between the demonstrators and their attackers. When he issued an order to ban nighttime demonstrations, federal judge Bryan Simpson overturned the order and placed the blame for the violence on the white counter-protestors. Governor Bryant called for calm and the establishment of a biracial committee to negotiate an end to the violence. He also sent aides to meet with Reverend King to coordinate actions. Although the violence decreased, the crisis in the city did not end until the Civil Rights Act became law in early July 1964.

=== Methodism and morality ===
Governor Bryant's commitment to his Christian faith and Methodism informed his decisions on many issues. He and his wife, Julia, were teetotalers, who forbade the serving of alcohol in the Florida Governor's Mansion. He opposed legalized gambling, the elimination of prayer and Bible readings in public schools, and the spread of pornography. And although he supported the death penalty, he anguished over the signing of death warrants, calling the process—ten death row inmates were executed during Bryant's term—'“a soul-searching experience.”'

== Later life and legacy ==
=== Business and law ===
After leaving office, Farris Bryant and the family moved to Jacksonville, Florida, where Bryant headed the National Life Insurance Company. Bryant later served as president of the Voyager Group insurance corporation. He made investments in banks and other ventures, including television stations. Bryant also maintained his law practice. In 1970, he became a founding partner in the law firm Bryant Miller Olive.

=== Federal offices ===
Farris Bryant being sworn in as Director of the Office of Emergency Planning, March 23, 1966

In March 1966, President Lyndon Johnson appointed Bryant director of the Office of Emergency Planning (OEP). The agency coordinated disaster relief, managed the nation’s civil defense efforts, and maintained reserves of emergency supplies. As director of OEP, Bryant also served on the National Security Council. Bryant, however, was more than a director of a federal agency. President Johnson saw Bryant as his ambassador to the states’ governors. He headed OEP until October 1967.

While Bryant was serving as director of OEP, President Johnson, in February 1967. appointed him chair of the U.S. Advisory Commission on Intergovernmental Relations, an agency designed to coordinate actions and resolve problems between federal, state, and local governments. His term as chair ended in October 1969.

=== 1970 Senate campaign ===
In 1970, Bryant entered the race for the U.S. Senate seat long held by retiring senator Spessard Holland. Bryant's years of political experience and high name recognition made him the candidate to beat in the Florida Democratic primary. Although most candidates did not want to discuss it, the hot topic of the day was federally mandated school busing to speed up the integration of the nation’s public schools. Bryant and most of the Democratic candidates opposed busing. He called on the states to take public schools out of the jurisdiction of the courts. Bryant won the first primary but had to face state senator Lawton M. Chiles Jr. in the runoff. Chiles pulled an upset victory and went on to defeat his Republican opponent in the November election. The 1970 race was Bryant's last run for political office.

=== Last years ===
Bryant’s wife, Julia, died of cancer on September 8, 1996, at age 78. Recalling her loss in 2000, Bryant said. “She and I were one person. To lose her was hell.” After Julia died, Bryant entered a period of deep depression; however, he managed to find joy during his remaining years by spending time with his daughters, grandchildren, and practicing his Methodist faith. Farris Bryant died in Jacksonville on March 1, 2002, age eighty-seven, after suffering a stroke. He wanted to be remembered as the governor who laid the foundation for the modernization of Florida through the following initiatives: his building program for higher education and expansion of the junior college and university systems; increased transportation infrastructure through the completion of the Florida Turnpike and other highway systems; the promotion of business investment and tourism in Florida; and his embrace and promotion of NASA's presence in Florida as proof that the growth and modernization of Florida was vital to the state and the nation. Bryant, however, recognized that his support for segregation during his years in the Florida Legislature and as governor would forever be a part of his place in history. While he came to accept civil rights for African Americans as the right thing for Florida and the country, he maintained that true equality would only come when people changed their own minds about race and learned to accept one another as individuals.

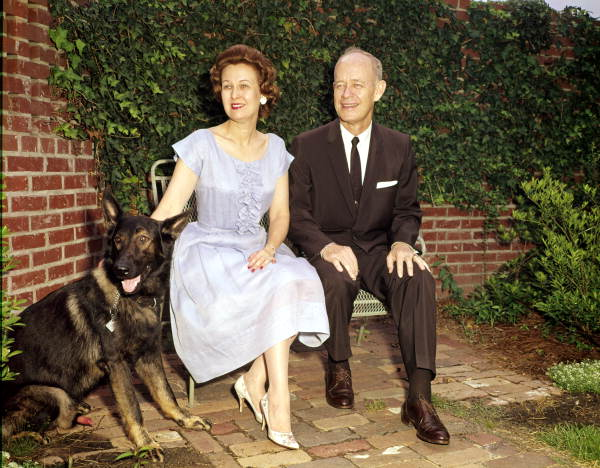
Governor Farris Bryant and Florida first lady Julia Bryant pose with Vic, the family's German shepherd, at the Florida Governor's Mansion

In 2000, Bryant created the Farris and Julia Bryant Florida History Preservation Fund Endowment for the University of Florida George A. Smathers Libraries to preserve Florida history and culture. Collections digitally and physically preserved include the Papers of C. Farris Bryant and the Florida History and Heritage Collections".

The Age of the Mind is a 2013 documentary film about Bryant's policies and their lasting impact on Florida. Focusing on his years as governor, the documentary highlights many contentious episodes during his administration, including the St. Augustine Civil Rights protests, the construction of the Florida Turnpike and Florida Barge Canal, and the Cuban refugee crisis that resulted from the failed Bay of Pigs invasion.

Political offices
Preceded by Elmer B. Elliott	Speaker of the Florida House of Representatives; 1953–1954	Succeeded by Thomas E. David
Preceded by LeRoy Collins	Governor of Florida; 1961–1965	Succeeded by W. Haydon Burns
Preceded by Buford Ellington	Director of the Office of Emergency Planning; 1966–1967	Succeeded by Price Daniel
Party political offices
Preceded by LeRoy Collins	Democratic nominee for Governor of Florida; 1960	Succeeded by W. Haydon Burns
