= Donald C. McLaren =

American politician (1918–1983)

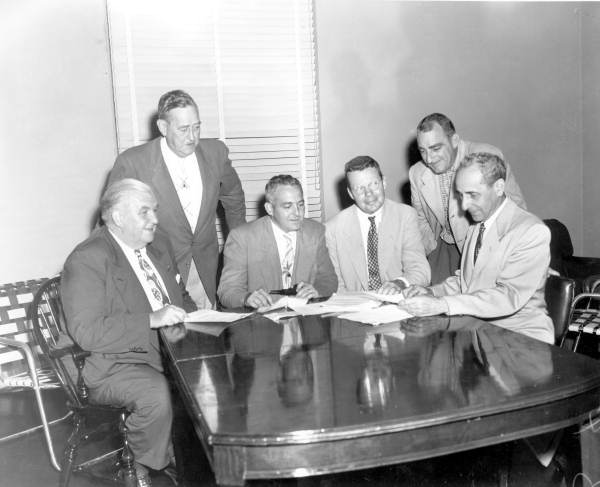
- McLaren with William A. Washburne Jr., J. Frank Houghton, Fred C. Petersen, Henry S. Bartholomew and B. E. Shaffer in 1953

Member of the Florida House of Representatives from Pinellas County
- In office 1951–1953

Personal details
- Born: June 29, 1918 Grand Rapids, Michigan, U.S.
- Died: March 24, 1983 (aged 64)
- Party: Republican
- Education: Grand Rapids Junior College; Michigan State College

Donald C. McLaren (June 29, 1918 – March 24, 1983) was an American politician. He served as a Republican member of the Florida House of Representatives.

== Life and career ==
McLaren was born in Grand Rapids, Michigan. He attended Grand Rapids Junior College and Michigan State College.

McLaren served in the Florida House of Representatives from 1951 to 1953.

McLaren died on March 24, 1983, at the age of 64.
