= J. Thomas Watson =

American politician (1885–1954)

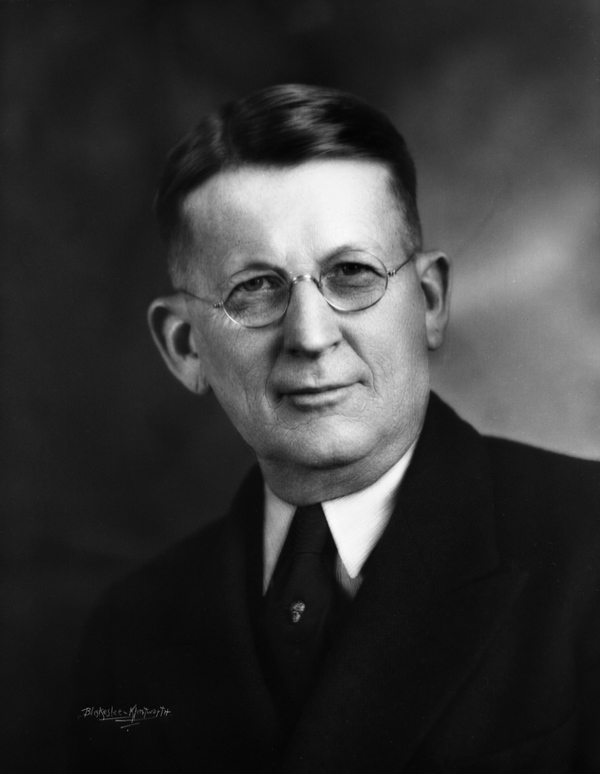

27th Florida Attorney General
- In office January 7, 1941 – January 4, 1949
- Governor: Spessard Holland; Millard Caldwell
- Preceded by: George Couper Gibbs
- Succeeded by: Richard Ervin

Personal details
- Born: November 20, 1885; Danville, Virginia, U.S.
- Died: October 24, 1954 (aged 68); Tampa, Florida, U.S.
- Political party: Democratic (before 1954); Republican (after 1954)
- Spouse: Mary Wicks Boisseau (m. 1915)
- Children: 3
- Education: Washington and Lee University (LLB)
- Profession: Lawyer

John Thomas Watson (November 20, 1885 – October 24, 1954) was an American lawyer and politician who served as the 27th Florida attorney general from 1941 to 1949.

== Early life and education ==
Watson was born in Danville, Virginia, on November 2, 1885. In 1903, he became superintendent of the Havana-American Cigar Company in Tampa, Florida. He served in this position until 1908, when he returned to Virginia to attend Washington and Lee University, where he received his Bachelor of Laws in 1911. Upon graduation, Watson was admitted to the Virginia Bar and the Florida Bar.

== Political career ==
Watson served as a municipal judge in Tampa from 1913 until 1915. In 1931, he represented part of Hillsborough County in the Florida House of Representatives. In 1932, he ran for Governor of Florida. Facing a tough competition, including former Governors John W. Martin and Cary A. Hardee, Watson finished last in the Democratic primary out of eight candidates, receiving just 1.42% of the vote.

In 1935 Watson was appointed as a United States Special Attorney by the U.S. Department of Justice, a position he served in until 1938.

Watson won election in 1940 to become the 27th Attorney General of Florida. As Attorney General, Watson was very strict in his opposition to labor unions. Watson instituted legal action in order to outlaw closed shops, believing they violated public policy. This was a result of a controversial closed shop agreement between the Tampa Shipbuilding Corporation and the American Federation of Labor. Watson also supported the Taft–Hartley Act and instituted right-to-work laws. Watson served as Florida Attorney General until 1948.

In 1948, Watson became a practicing attorney in Tampa. He ran again for governor in 1948, finishing fifth out of nine in the Democratic primary, receiving 9% of the vote. He then ran for the U.S. House of Representatives, running in District 1, which included Hillsborough County. Watson lost in the Democratic primary runoff, losing 59% to 41% to State Attorney Chester B. McMullen.

In 1954, Watson changed his party affiliation to Republican in order to run for a special election following the death of Governor Dan McCarty. Watson defeated Charles E. Compton in the Republican primary, and faced State Senator LeRoy Collins, a staunch segregationist, in the general election. However, Watson died just two weeks before the election. Despite his death, he still received 20% of the vote.

Party political offices
Preceded by Harry S. Swan	Republican nominee for Governor of Florida; 1954 (died)	Succeeded by William A. Washburne Jr.
Legal offices
Preceded by George Couper Gibbs	Florida Attorney General; 1941–1949	Succeeded by Richard Ervin
