= 1954 Florida gubernatorial special election =

- November 2, 1954
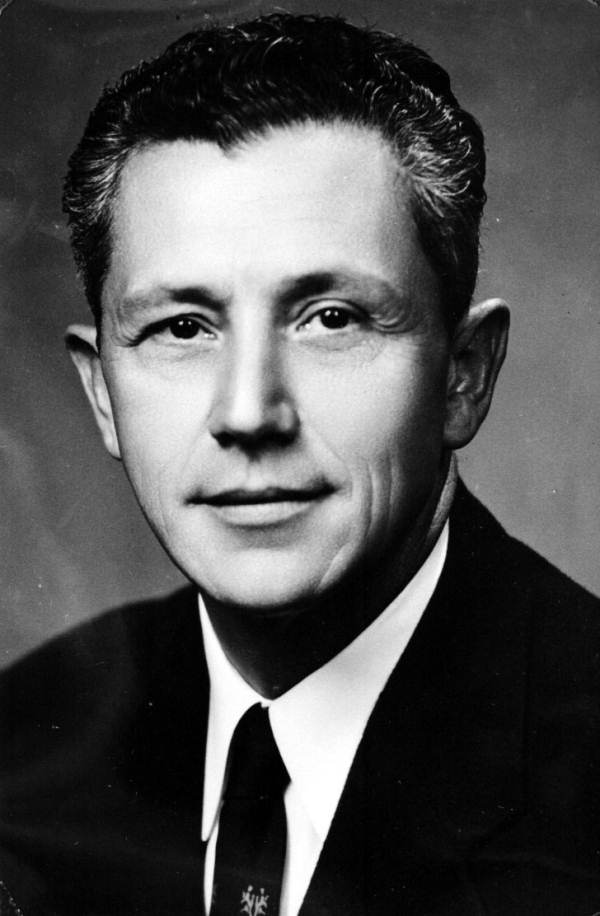

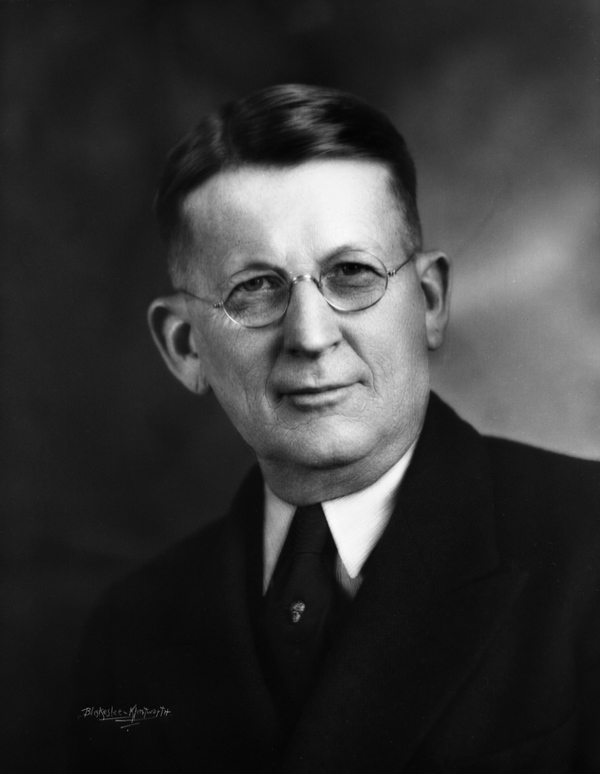
Nominee	LeRoy Collins	J. Thomas Watson †
Party	Democratic	Republican
Popular vote	287,769	69,852
Percentage	80.43%	19.52%
- County results Collins: 60–70% 70–80% 80–90% >90%
Governor before election
Charley E. Johns (acting)
Democratic
Elected Governor
LeRoy Collins
Democratic

The 1954 Florida gubernatorial special election was held on November 2, 1954, to elect a successor to Daniel T. McCarty, who died in office on September 28, 1953.

State Senator LeRoy Collins won the Democratic nomination in a three-way race against acting Governor Charley E. Johns and J. Brailey Odham. He defeated Johns in a run-off election with 54.8% of the vote. In the general election, Collins faced J. Thomas Watson, the former Attorney General who had switched his party affiliation to run as a Republican in the special election. However, Watson died two weeks before the election, and Collins won a landslide with 80.43% of the vote.

== Background ==
On September 28, 1953, Governor Daniel T. McCarty, who was elected in the 1952 gubernatorial election, died in office of pneumonia. McCarty's death elevated Florida Senate President Charley E. Johns to acting governor and a special election for November 1954 was called to fill the position for the final two years of McCarty's term. The state constitution was revised in 1968 to establish a position of Lieutenant Governor who is first in line to succeed the governor.

== Primary elections ==
Primary elections were held on May 4, 1954, with the Democratic runoff held on May 25, 1954.

=== Democratic primary ===
30.1% of the voting age population participated in the Democratic primary.

==== Candidates ====
- LeRoy Collins, State Senator
- Charley E. Johns, incumbent acting Governor
- J. Brailey Odham, former State Representative

==== Results ====
Democratic Primary Runoff by county Collins: 50–60%; 60–70%; Johns: 50–60%; 60–70%; 70–80%; >90%

Democratic primary results
Party	Candidate	Votes	%
Democratic	Charley E. Johns (incumbent)	255,787	38.39
Democratic	LeRoy Collins	222,791	33.43
Democratic	J. Brailey Odham	187,782	28.18
Total votes		666,360	100.00

Democratic primary runoff results
Party	Candidate	Votes	%
Democratic	LeRoy Collins	380,323	54.76
Democratic	Charley E. Johns (incumbent)	314,198	45.24
Total votes		694,521	100.00

=== Republican primary ===
1.6% of the voting age population participated in the Republican primary.

==== Candidates ====
- J. Thomas Watson, former Florida Attorney General
- Charles E. Compton

==== Results ====
Republican primary results
Party	Candidate	Votes	%
Republican	J. Thomas Watson	24,429	67.89
Republican	Charles E. Compton	11,552	32.11
Total votes		35,981	100.00

== General election ==
=== Candidates ===
- LeRoy Collins, Democratic
- J. Thomas Watson, Republican

=== Campaign ===
Watson, the Republican nominee, died on 24 October. His name remained on the ballot.

=== Results ===
1954 Florida gubernatorial election
Party	Candidate	Votes	%	±%
Democratic	LeRoy Collins	287,769	80.43%	
Republican	J. Thomas Watson	69,852	19.52%	
Write-ins		162	0.05%	
Majority		217,917	60.91%	
Turnout		357,783	100.00%	
Democratic hold		Swing		

== Works cited ==
- Morris, Allen (1965). The Florida Handbook, 1965-66. Tallahassee, FL: The Peninsular Publishing Company.
- Gray, R. A. (1955). Report of the Secretary of State of Florida, 1953-54. Florida. Office of Secretary of State.
- Glashan, Roy R. (1979). American Governors and Gubernatorial Elections, 1775-1978. Meckler Books. ISBN 0-930466-17-9.
- Steed, Robert; Moreland, Laurence; Baker, Tod, eds. (1980). Party Politics in the South. Praeger Publishers. ISBN 0030565863.
