= George Couper Gibbs =

American lawyer and politician

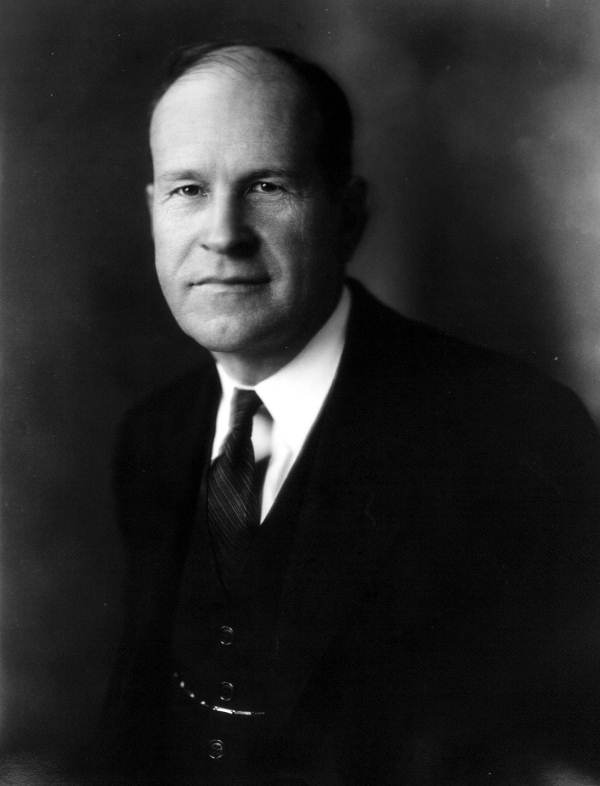

26th Florida Attorney General
- In office May 16, 1938 – January 7, 1941
- Governor: Fred P. Cone
- Preceded by: Cary D. Landis
- Succeeded by: J. Thomas Watson

Judge of the Fourth Judicial Circuit Court of Florida
- In office 1913–1935
- Appointed by: Park Trammell

Judge of the Duval County Municipal Court
- In office 1912–1913
- Governor: Albert W. Gilchrist

Personal details
- Born: October 28, 1879 Jacksonville, Florida, US
- Died: September 17, 1946 (aged 66) Jacksonville, Florida, US
- Party: Democratic
- Spouse: Lenora Bausch
- Children: 4
- Education: Washington and Lee University (LL.B)
- Occupation: Attorney

Military service
- Allegiance: United States
- Branch/service: Florida Army National Guard
- Years of service: 1898
- Rank: Corporal
- Unit: 1st Florida Volunteer Infantry Regiment
- Battles/wars: Spanish–American War

George Couper Gibbs (October 28, 1879 – September 17, 1946) was an American attorney and politician who served as the 26th Florida Attorney General from 1938 until 1941.

== Early life and education ==
Gibbs was born in Jacksonville, Florida on October 28, 1879. Gibbs was named after his grandfather, Colonel George Couper Gibbs, an officer in the Confederate States Army during the American Civil War.

Gibbs was mustered into service on April 25, 1898, the day the Spanish–American War began. He served in the Florida Army National Guard, having been assigned as a corporal in Company G of the 1st Florida Volunteer Infantry. His regiment did not see any combat, remaining in Tampa, Florida, and later Huntsville, Alabama, for the majority of the war. Gibbs was mustered out of the military on October 8, 1898.

In 1901, Gibbs began attending Washington and Lee University in Lexington, Virginia. He graduated with his Bachelor of Laws degree in 1903. Gibbs was admitted to the Florida Bar the same year, and he joined the law firm A. W. Cockrell & Son as a law assistant.

== Political career ==
In 1912, Gibbs was elected to the municipal court of Duval County. He served until 1913, when Governor Park Trammell appointed him to the Fourth Judicial Circuit Court of Florida. Gibbs served on the court for an extended period of time, resigning to return to private practice in 1935.

=== Death of Arthur Maillefert ===
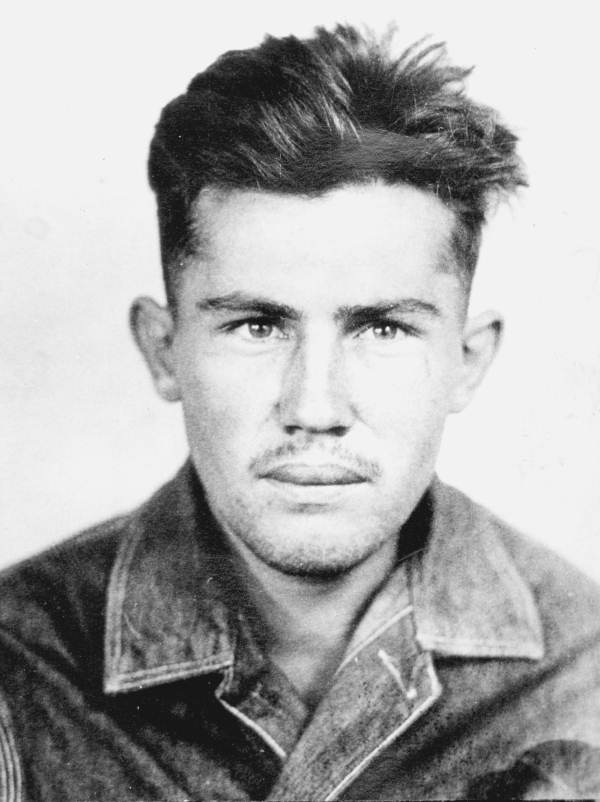
The 19 year old inmate, Arthur Maillefert, died in the Sunbeam Prison Camp in Florida. He was strangled by the chain that held him in place; he was unable to stand because his feet were in stocks. The Maillefert case of abuse received much attention and was reported in the New York Times.

During his time on the court, Gibbs was launched into national fame when he presided over a case involving the death of Arthur Maillefert. Maillefert was a 22-year-old drifter from New Jersey who moved to Florida to try to make it big as a criminal during the Great Depression. After being run out of Dade County in 1930, Maillefert was arrested following an armed robbery at a Daytona Beach gas station. After being caught following his escape, Maillefert was sentenced to 9 years in the Sunbeam Prison Camp, also known as Road Camp 36, near Jacksonville. The prison utilized prisoner labor in order to clear out swampland for the creation of U.S. Route 1. One day while in solitary confinement for refusing to work, Maillefert was able to escape.

On June 3, 1932, a guard, Solomon Higginbotham, chased Maillefert with two bloodhounds and recaptured him. The camp's warden, George Washington Courson, personally tied a chain around Maillefert's neck and left him in solitary confinement. When guards checked on him an hour later, Maillefert had asphyxiated. After a sensational article by the New York Times garnered national attention, Courson and Higginbotham were both charged with first-degree murder. Gibbs, presiding over the trial, acquitted Higginbotham and sentenced Courson to 20-years of hard labor. The verdict was reversed on appeal and a new trial ordered which never took place.

Gibbs retired from the court 3 years later, having served a total of 22 years on the bench. He returned to private practice in Jacksonville.

=== Florida Attorney General ===
On May 16, 1938, Governor Fred P. Cone appointed Gibbs as the 26th Florida Attorney General, succeeding Cary D. Landis, who had died in office. While he was in office, World War II began in Europe. In the 1940 commencement address at the University of Florida, Gibbs stressed the importance of patriotism in America, citing the lack of freedoms in Nazi Germany and the quick conquest of the neighboring countries. Gibbs did not seek a full term in the 1940 election, preferring to return to private practice.

== Death and personal life ==
Gibbs was a member of Civitan International, Phi Delta Phi, and Phi Kappa Psi. Gibbs died in Jacksonville on September 17, 1946. The George Couper Gibbs residence at 2717 Riverside Avenue in Jacksonville was designed by Mellen Clark Greeley. It is listed on the National Register of Historic Places as part of the Riverside Historic District.
