= Belfalls, Texas =

- Unincorporated community
- Location within Texas Location within the United States
- Coordinates: 31°10′24″N 97°12′13″W
- Country: United States
- State: Texas
- County: Bell
- Elevation: 551 ft (168 m)
- Time zone: UTC-6 (Central (CST))
  - Summer (DST): UTC-5 (CDT)
- Area code: 254
- GNIS feature ID: 1351814

Belfalls is an unincorporated community in Bell County, Texas, United States. According to the Handbook of Texas, the community had a population of 20 in 2000. It is located within the Killeen-Temple-Fort Hood metropolitan area.

== Geography ==
Belfalls is located at the intersection of Farm to Market Roads 438 and 935, 9 mi (14 km) northeast of Temple in northeastern Bell County.

== Education ==
In 1903, Belfalls had a school with 69 students and two teachers. Today, the community is served by the Troy Independent School District.

== Notable person ==
- Elmer B. Elliott, speaker at the Florida House of Representatives, was born in Belfalls.
