= 1956 Florida gubernatorial election =

- November 6, 1956
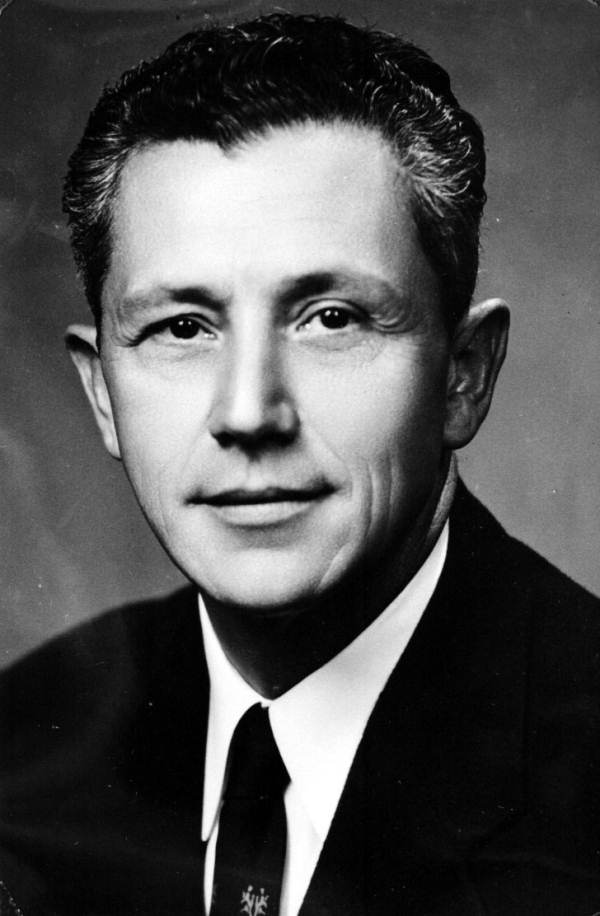

Nominee	LeRoy Collins	William A. Washburne Jr.
Party	Democratic	Republican
Popular vote	747,753	266,980
Percentage	73.69%	26.31%
- County results Collins: 60–70% 70–80% 80–90% >90%
Governor before election
LeRoy Collins
Democratic
Elected Governor
LeRoy Collins
Democratic

The 1956 Florida gubernatorial election was held on November 6, 1956. Incumbent Democrat LeRoy Collins defeated Republican nominee William A. Washburne Jr. in a landslide with 73.69% of the vote.

== Primary elections ==
Primary elections were held on May 8, 1956.

=== Democratic primary ===
34.1% of the voting age population participated in the Democratic primary.

==== Candidates ====
- LeRoy Collins, incumbent Governor
- Sumter de Leon Lowry Jr., businessman, retired National Guard general, opponent of racial integration, and anti-communist activist
- C. Farris Bryant, former State Representative
- Fuller Warren, former Governor
- Peaslee Streets
- W.B. "Bill" Price

==== Results ====
Democratic Primary by county Collins: 30–40%; 40–50%; 50–60%; 60–70%; 70–80%; Lowry: 30–40%; 40–50%; 50–60%; Bryant: 50–60%; Warren: 30–40%; 50–60%; 70–80%

Democratic primary results
Party	Candidate	Votes	%
Democratic	LeRoy Collins (incumbent)	434,274	51.69
Democratic	Sumter de Leon Lowry Jr.	179,019	21.31
Democratic	C. Farris Bryant	110,469	13.15
Democratic	Fuller Warren	107,990	12.86
Democratic	Peaslee Streets	5,086	0.61
Democratic	W.B. "Bill" Price	3,245	0.39
Total votes		840,083	100.00

== General election ==
=== Candidates ===
- LeRoy Collins, Democratic
- William A. Washburne Jr., Republican

=== Results ===
1956 Florida gubernatorial election
Party	Candidate	Votes	%	±%
Democratic	LeRoy Collins (incumbent)	747,753	73.69%	
Republican	William A. Washburne Jr.	266,980	26.31%	
Majority		480,773		
Turnout		1,014,733		
Democratic hold		Swing		

== Works cited ==
- Steed, Robert; Moreland, Laurence; Baker, Tod, eds. (1980). Party Politics in the South. Praeger Publishers. ISBN 0030565863.
