= Cary D. Landis =

American attorney and politician

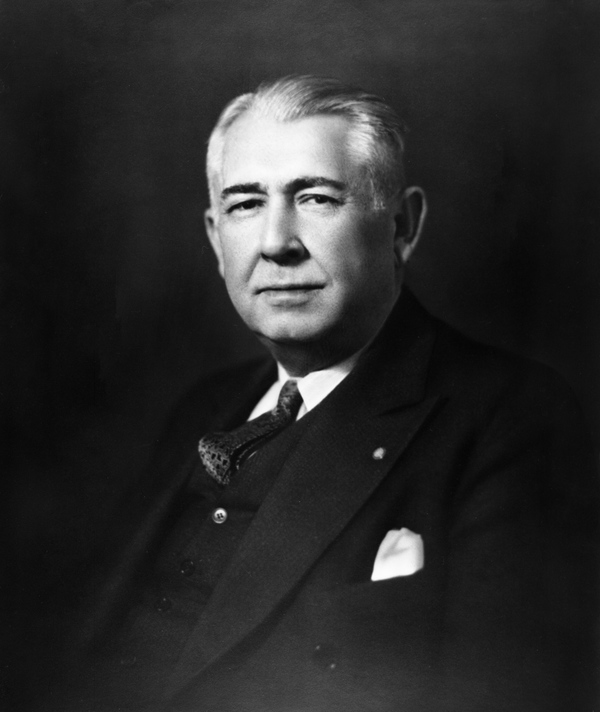

25th Florida Attorney General
- In office March 9, 1931 – May 10, 1938
- Governor: Doyle E. Carlton; David Sholtz; Fred P. Cone
- Preceded by: Fred Henry Davis
- Succeeded by: George Couper Gibbs

State Attorney for the Seventh Judicial Circuit Court of Florida
- In office 1911–1913
- Governor: Albert W. Gilchrist

Superintendent of the Carroll Consolidated School Corporation
- In office 1894–1896

Personal details
- Born: May 10, 1873 Claypool, Indiana, U.S.
- Died: May 10, 1938 (aged 65) Tallahassee, Florida, U.S.
- Party: Democratic
- Spouse: Margaret Weaver (m. 1895)
- Children: 3
- Education: North Manchester College; Indiana Normal School; University of Michigan (LL.B)
- Occupation: Educator

Cary Dayton Landis (May 10, 1873 – May 10, 1938) was an American attorney and politician who served as the 25th Florida Attorney General, serving from 1931 until 1938.

== Early life and education ==
Landis was born in Claypool, Indiana, a small town in rural Kosciusko County, on May 10, 1873. Landis is Pennsylvania Dutch via his father's side of the family, and was raised Presbyterian.

In 1889, Landis began attending nearby North Manchester College, and graduating in 1891. He then began attending Indiana Normal School, now known as Indiana State University, the same year. While attending Indiana Normal School Landis served as the principal of Silver Lake High School in Silver Lake, Indiana, a small town just south of Claypool.

After graduating from Indiana Normal School in 1892, Landis moved to Carroll County, Indiana and became the principal of Carroll High School in Flora, Indiana. He remained in this position until 1894, when he was appointed the Superintendent of the Carroll Consolidated School Corporation, at the time based out of nearby Burlington, Indiana.

Landis left this position in 1896 in order to pursue legal studies at the University of Michigan. Landis graduated with his Bachelor of Laws degree in 1899, and was admitted into the Indiana Bar the same year. He later created a law partnership in Huntington, Indiana with Fred H. Bowers, a friend and fellow Indianan from the University of Michigan.

In 1901, Landis became a professor at the newly established College of Law at Stetson University in DeLand, Florida. The following year, Landis began a law partnership with Bert Fish, who would later become the U.S. Ambassador to Egypt and later the first U.S. Ambassador to Saudi Arabia. Landis stopped teaching in 1905, though he continued his law practice with Fish.

== Political career ==
In 1911, Landis, a Democrat, was elected the State Attorney for the Seventh Judicial Circuit Court of Florida, winning a majority in every county in the district. He did not seek reelection in 1913, opting to instead return to private practice.

On March 9, 1931, Landis was appointed Florida Attorney General by Governor Doyle E. Carlton, in order to complete the term of Fred Henry Davis, who had been appointed to the Supreme Court of Florida. Landis was elected to a full term in 1932, having run unopposed. As the Florida Attorney General, Landis imposed weight limits on trucks in order to preserve the surface of the roads, enforced via a dozen weight inspectors. This force of inspectors would later evolve into the Florida Highway Patrol.

Landis also argued several tax-related cases before the Supreme Court of the United States, most notably McNee v. Wall (1933), Lee v. Bickell (1934), and Atlantic Coast Railroad v. State of Florida (1935).

== Death and legacy ==
Landis died in office on his 65th birthday, May 10, 1938, after a two-week illness. His remains were sent back to Carroll County, and he is buried in Ball Hill Cemetery in Cutler, Indiana.

In 1939, Florida State University renamed Seniors Hall to Landis Hall in his honor. Landis Hall now serves as a freshman dormitory for the Florida State University Honors Program. The university's central common was also renamed the Landis Green.

In 2016, Donald Lehe and Heath VanNatter, both members of the Indiana House of Representatives, created a resolution urging the Indiana Department of Transportation to rename part of Indiana State Road 75 to the Cary D. Landis Memorial Mile. The resolution faded into obscurity and the road was not renamed.

== Personal life ==
Landis married Margaret Weaver, a native of Carroll County, in 1895. They had three children together, sons Erskine Weaver and William David and daughter Guinevere Elizabeth. Guinevere died in 1928 and William, who was mentally disabled, died in 1934.

Landis was a member of the Freemasons, Shriners, Elks, and Kiwanis.
