= ZooTampa at Lowry Park =

Nonprofit zoo in Tampa, Florida

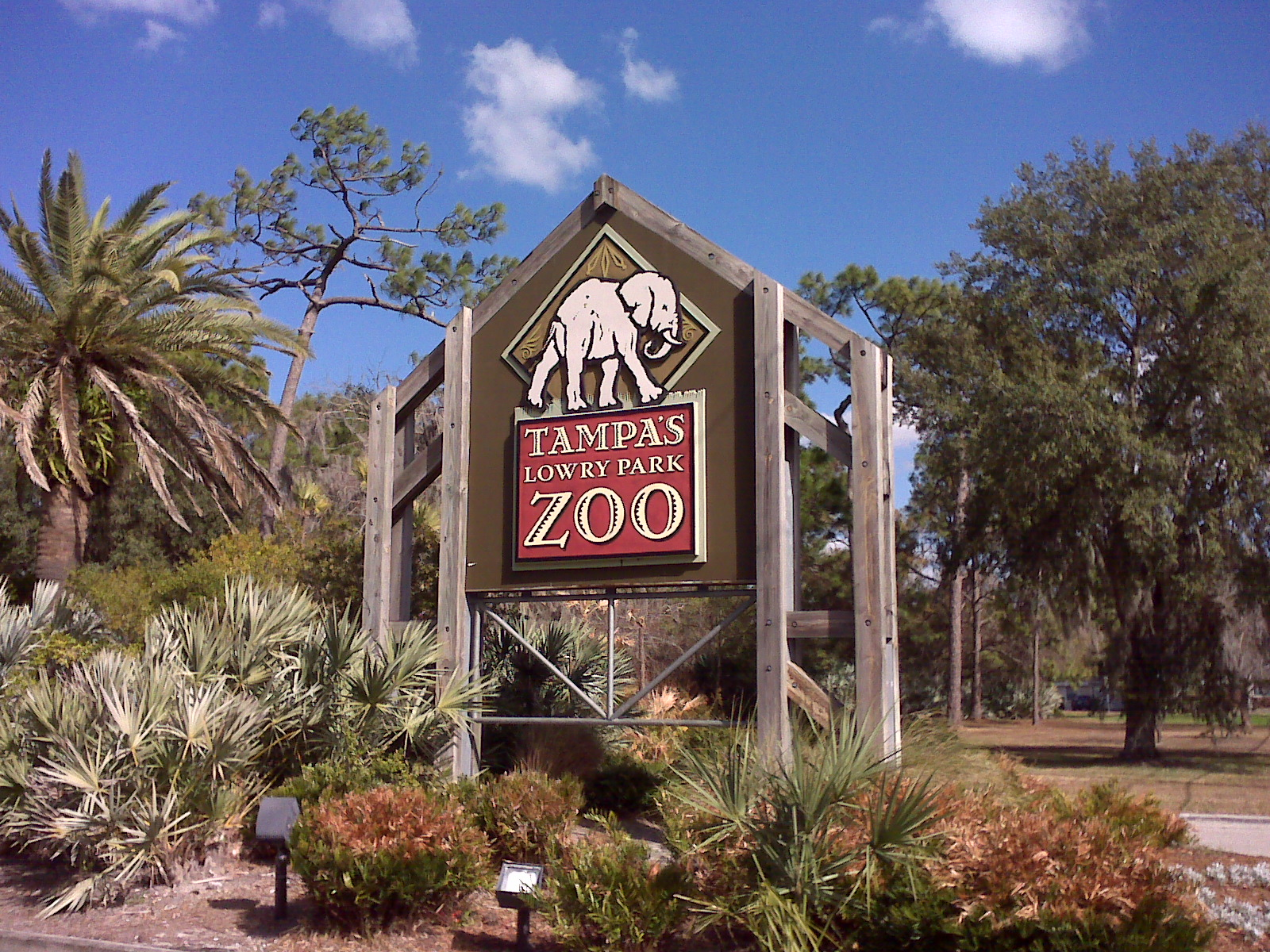
- Interactive map of ZooTampa at Lowry Park
- 28°00′48″N 82°28′10″W
- Date opened: 1957
- Location: 1101 W. Sligh Avenue, 33604 Tampa, Florida, United States
- Land area: 63 acres (25 ha)
- No. of animals: 1,300+
- Memberships: AZA
- Website: zootampa.org

ZooTampa at Lowry Park (originally known as Tampa Fairyland and later Tampa Fairyland Zoo, Lowry Park Zoo, and Lowry Park Zoological Garden) is a 63-acre (25 ha) nonprofit zoo located in Tampa, Florida. In 2009, Lowry Park Zoo was voted the #1 Family Friendly Zoo in the US by Parents Magazine, and is recognized by the State of Florida as the center for Florida wildlife conservation and biodiversity (HB 457). The zoo is operated by the Lowry Park Zoological Society, an independent 501(c)(3) non-profit organization. The zoo also exists as a center for conservation of endangered wildlife both locally and around the globe. Tampa’s Lowry Park Zoo is accredited by the Association of Zoos and Aquariums (AZA) as well as a member of the World Association of Zoos and Aquariums (WAZA), Conservation Breeding Specialist Group (CBSG), the Florida Association of Zoos and Aquariums (FAZA) and the Florida Attractions Association (FAA).

ZooTampa traces its origins to a small animal exhibit that was located on the campus of the University of Tampa in downtown beginning in the 1930s. It moved to its current location in the Seminole Heights neighborhood in 1957 and became known as the Lowry Park Zoo, with various small rides and other entertainment facilities added in the following years. The animal enclosures were run down and deemed unhealthy by the 1980s, and after several years of fundraising, the zoo was completely redesigned and rebuilt in 1987-1988. Since reopening, several new sections and attractions have been added, often with a geographic theme.

A 24-year-old trainer was crushed to death by an Asian Elephant in July 1993. The zoo moved both of their elephants two weeks later and did not bring them back for another decade.

In 2018, the zoo was rebranded as "ZooTampa at Lowry Park" as part of another large renovation and expansion project. Nearly 1 million people visit the 63-acre (25 ha) zoo a year to see its more than 1,300 animals.

== History ==
Tampa's first zoo was a small collection of exotic animals in Plant Park on the grounds of the University of Tampa across the Hillsborough River from downtown.

In the 1950s, city council member and (later) mayor Nick Nuccio led the push to establish a larger zoo at a more spacious location. and the city chose a plot of land across the street from existing Lowry Park, a public greenspace in the neighborhood of Seminole Heights along the Hillsborough River. The park had been created in 1925 and named after Sumter de Leon Lowry Sr., a Tampa city commissioner and gubernatorial candidate who was a somewhat controversial figure for his vocal support of segregation and his active membership in the Sons of Confederate Veterans. Lowry's son, Sumter de Leon Lowry Jr., later made significant contributions to improve the park, including donating money to construct a bandstand and paying the purchase price for an elephant which he then donated to the zoo.

The old rainbow bridge to Fairyland, Lowry Park Zoo, c. 1980

Tampa Fairyland Zoo opened in 1957, where back then concrete statues depicting fairy tales and nursery rhymes were along a winding maze of paths beneath the limbs of sprawling oak trees. This whimsical area was accessible via a large rainbow bridge, with the zoo located on the other side.

As the wildlife collection grew, other attractions and rides were also added. By the early 1980s, the zoo featured a small roller coaster, a skyride, and a kid-sized train, among other kiddie rides. However, the zoo facilities were in need of repair and renovation, with the animals cramped concrete quarters so poor that the Humane Society called it "one of the worst zoos in America".

After several years of fundraising and with the help and support of mayor Bob Martinez and the city of Tampa, the original Lowry Park Zoo closed on September 7, 1987 for a $20 million reconstruction in which nearly all traces of the original zoo (including Fairyland) were removed and replaced with more modern facilities. The first phase of the revamped zoo opened on March 5, 1988. Several additions and expansions since then have brought the zoo to its current configuration. Fairyland ceased to exist by 1996, and the Rainbow Bridge was removed in the early 2000s.

In March 2018, Joseph Couceiro, the zoo's CEO, introduced a new logo and signage. Formerly Lowry Park Zoo, the name was changed to ZooTampa at Lowry Park to emphasize not only its connections to Tampa and the region, but the progress the area is undergoing as well. Over the next 10 years, Couceiro indicated a desire to continue to expand and redesign several zoo features.

== Exhibits ==
=== Asian Gardens ===
One of the zoos oldest sections, the Asian Domain, was renovated and renamed the Asian Gardens in 2007. Animals in this area include the Indian rhinoceros, Malayan tigers, babirusa, Visayan warty pig, Komodo dragon, Binturongs, Lowland anoa, sun bears, gharials, Malayan tapir, and an Indonesian-themed aviary. The pagoda-like design is subtle but noticeable, giving an authentic Asian feel.

The area also has a Sulawesi aviary, which includes bleeding-heart doves, mandarin ducks, giant Asian pond turtles, and Reeve's muntjac deer.

=== Florida Wildlife Center ===
The Florida Wildlife Center is an American-based exhibit that stretches across nearly a half-mile, accessible through Asian Gardens. The exhibit includes many North American species and a few Central American species (with an Asian twist), including striped skunks, American alligators, a False gharial, North American black bears, a small pack of red wolves, West Indian manatees, and an Alligator snapping turtle.

It also includes a manatee education show, an aquatic center with sharks, eels, seahorses, and a wide collection of snakes, including eastern diamondback rattlesnakes, copperheads, and eastern coral snakes. A Discovery Center highlights the amphibian residents of the zoo, showcasing various species of frogs, toads and other creatures.

=== Primate World ===
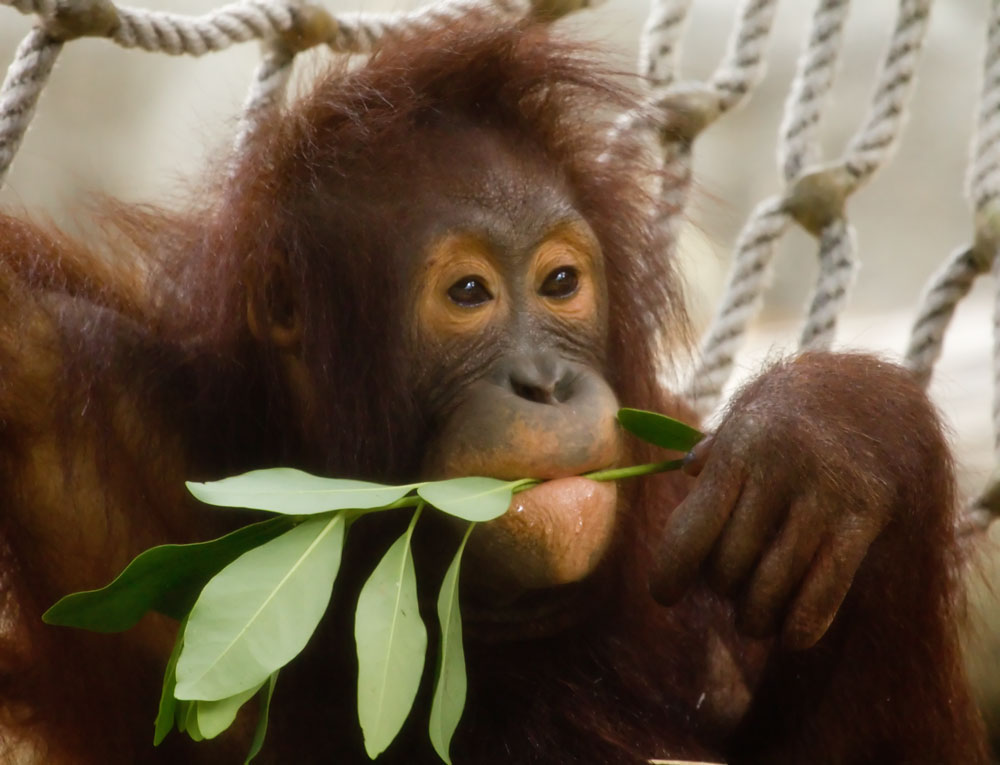
Orangutan with a leaf at Lowry Park

The primate section of the zoo has every exhibit appearing to be seemingly connected by a running system of rocky waterfalls and waterways that stretch across the entire section. There is an array of great apes, including siamang gibbons, Hamadryas baboons, and Bornean orangutans. There is also a wide array of other primates, including Angolan black-and-white colobus monkeys, golden lion tamarins, ring-tailed lemurs, and mandrills.

=== Wallaroo Station ===
The Wallaroo Station Children's Zoo re-opened on February 27, 2015 after its first renovation since opening in 2002. It is home to an array of Australian-native species including koalas, yellow-footed rock wallabies, Australian singing dogs and emus, along with a varying collection of cockatoos, and flying foxes.

This section of the zoo is home to an interactive bat habitat, a "Flying Bananas" ride, a kiddie train ride called the Overlook Express, a budgie encounter and a family roller coaster called the Tasmanian Tiger Roller Coaster. It also has splash play area for younger kids titled "The Billabong".

=== Safari Africa ===
Shaded by acacia trees, the area is home to a safari tram ride that provides an in-depth look behind the scenes of the zoo. Martial eagles and Patas monkeys are visible only by this ride. This exhibit is home to many landmark African species, including meerkats, duikers, the Reticulated giraffe, Hartmann's mountain zebra, African bush elephant, East African crowned crane, African penguins, and the southern white rhinoceros.

The Ituri Forest, a later addition to the Safari Africa section, brought in the concept of a washed-out African river bank. The area includes a wide array of species, including greater flamingos, okapis, pygmy hippopotamuses, saddle-billed storks, and shoebill storks.

In mid-to late-2014, the warthog exhibit was closed down and renovated to house Aldabra tortoises and juvenile Galapagos giant tortoises, who were previously behind-the-scenes exclusive animals.

=== Main Aviary ===
The main free-flight aviary, accessible nearly at the entrance, is almost hidden in overgrown brush and plants. Inside, the whole area is covered head-to-toe in free-flight birds and waterfowl, including great hornbills, red-legged seriemas, toco toucans, boat-billed herons, African openbill storks, scarlet ibises, white-faced whistling ducks, guineafowl, Raggiana Birds-of-paradise, an array of ducks and tanagers, and two-toed sloths.

==== Spirits of the Sky Raptor Show ====
This show, held twice a day at the Zooventures Theater, is an experience that provides kids and adults with facts of birds of prey and what we can do to protect them. Some of the exhibited species include the Eurasian eagle-owl, the bald eagle, and the Andean condor.

=== Conservation ===
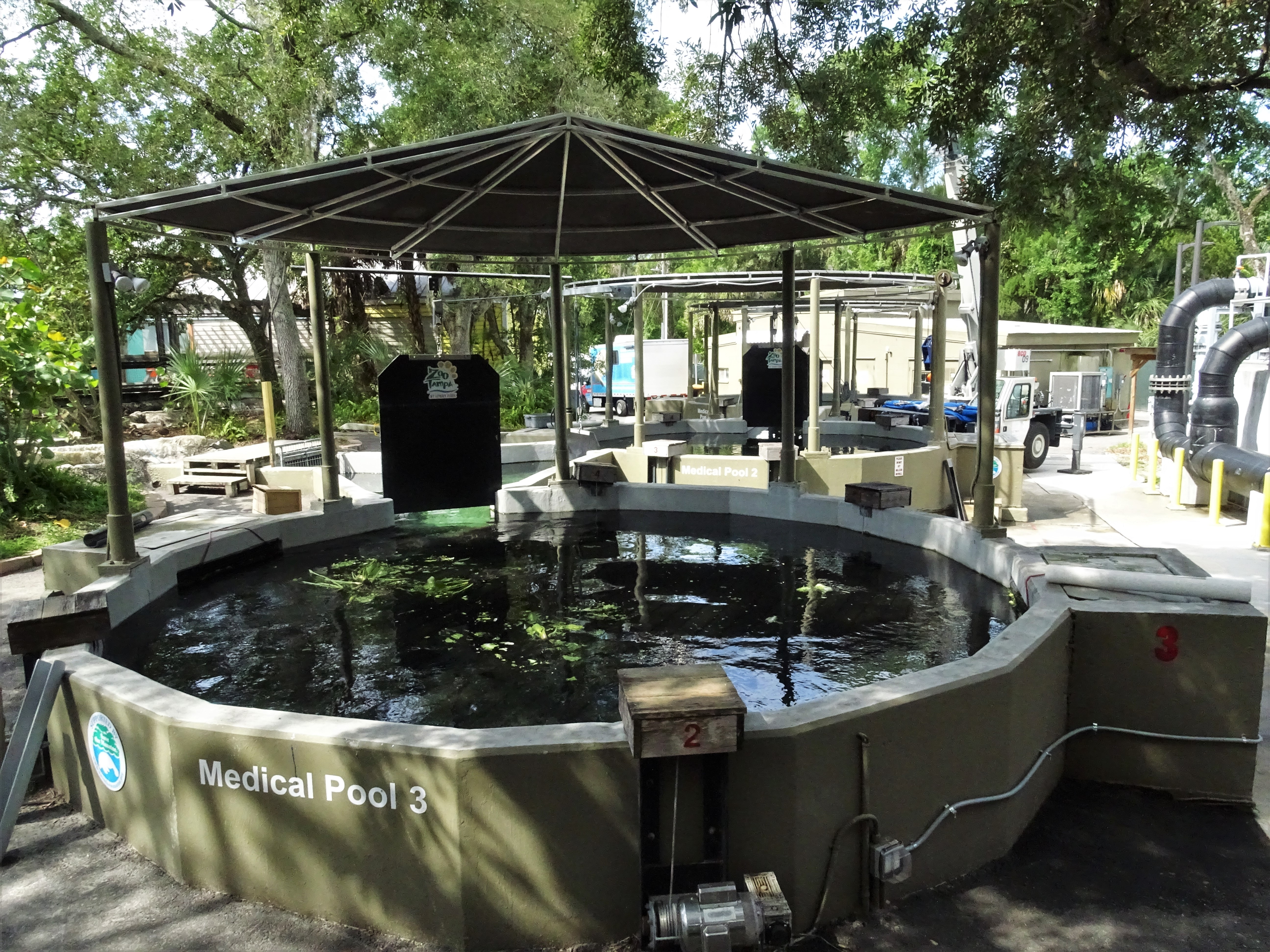
Manatee medical pools

The zoo has 95 Species Survival Plan projects, which includes threatened and endangered species and species of special concern. These include chimpanzees, Bornean orangutans, mandrills, siamangs, black-and-white colobus monkeys, golden lion tamarins, Indian rhinoceroses, clouded leopards, sloth bears, babirusa, red wolves, African elephants, Bali mynah, Victoria crowned pigeon, great Indian hornbills, palm cockatoo, and Komodo dragon programs.

The zoo hosts a hospital for Florida manatees in which injured animals are rehabilitated with the intent of returning them to the wild. It is the only non-profit hospital in the world specifically dedicated to critical care for injured, sick and orphaned wild manatees. The zoo works in partnership with the U.S. Fish and Wildlife Service and the Florida Fish and Wildlife Conservation Commission to rescue, rehabilitate and release Florida’s endangered manatees. In 2012, Tampa’s Lowry Park Zoo was honored with a “Significant Achievement in North American Conservation Award” for its work with manatees, presented by the Association of Zoos and Aquariums (AZA).

=== Rides ===
Starting with the Australia addition, Lowry Park Zoo has added several children's rides over the years. Rides include a zoo menagerie carousel named the Jungle Carousel, a small aerial carousel-type ride known as "Boomer’s Flyin’ Bananas", a kiddie train ride named the “Overland Express”, as well as a mini roller coaster called the Tasmanian Tiger Family Coaster, which was previously located at Wild Adventures Theme Park in Valdosta, Georgia.

Roaring Springs, which opened in June 2018, is a shoot the chute ride manufactured by WhiteWater West. The ride features a single three-story drop that splashes riders and onlookers standing in the attraction's splash zone. Roaring Springs replaced the former log flume known as “Gator Falls”.

== Controversies ==
=== Tiger escape ===
In 2006, one of the zoo's two Sumatran tigers, a 14-year-old female named Enshala, slipped through an unlocked gate and into an area undergoing renovation. The zoo director, Lex Salisbury, defended his decision to shoot and kill the animal after attempts to tranquilize the tiger failed and the animal lurched toward the animal doctor that had shot the tranquilizer dart.

Later in 2006, a group known as "Tampa's Zoo Advocates" formed. The organization seeks to improve the living conditions of the animals as well as working conditions of the employees of Lowry Park Zoo.

=== Salisbury scandal ===
In April 2008, 15 patas monkeys escaped from Safari Wild, a for-profit animal attraction under development east of Tampa in rural Polk County. This brought media attention to the venture, which is owned and operated by long-time Lowry Park Zoo director Lex Salisbury.

Subsequent investigations revealed many questionable transactions between Safari Wild and Lowry Park Zoo, including the transfer of over 200 zoo animals to Safari Wild, zoo funds being used to build structures on Safari Wild property, and payments from the zoo to "board" animals at Safari Wild. The city of Tampa, which provides a portion of the zoo's annual budget, demanded an audit detailing the relationship between Lowry Park, Salisbury, and his outside business ventures.

The audit was released in December 2008 and disclosed many questionable dealings between the zoo and Safari Wild. It also uncovered violations of zoo policies by Salisbury, including increasing his own bonus payments, charging the zoo for personal travel, and using zoo employees for his personal work. Auditors estimated that Salisbury owed the zoo more than $200,000 and suggested a criminal investigation. On December 19, 2008, Salisbury, under pressure from the zoo's board of directors and the city of Tampa, resigned from his position at the zoo.

As a result of possible violations of animal transfer rules and species survival plans, the Association of Zoos and Aquariums suspended the membership of Lowry Park Zoo and of Larry Killmar, the zoo's Director of Collections who had authorized many of Salisbury's questionable animal transfers. Under Killmar, the zoo reorganized its internal policies over several months, and on March 27, 2009, the AZA reinstated the membership of both Lowry Park Zoo and its director of collections.

The saga came to a close in August 2009 when Salisbury and the Lowry Park Zoo board agreed to a settlement in which Salisbury paid $2,200 and agreed to return all the structures, fencing, and equipment that the zoo had built at Safari Wild but did not admit to any wrongdoing.
