= Elmer B. Elliott =

American politician

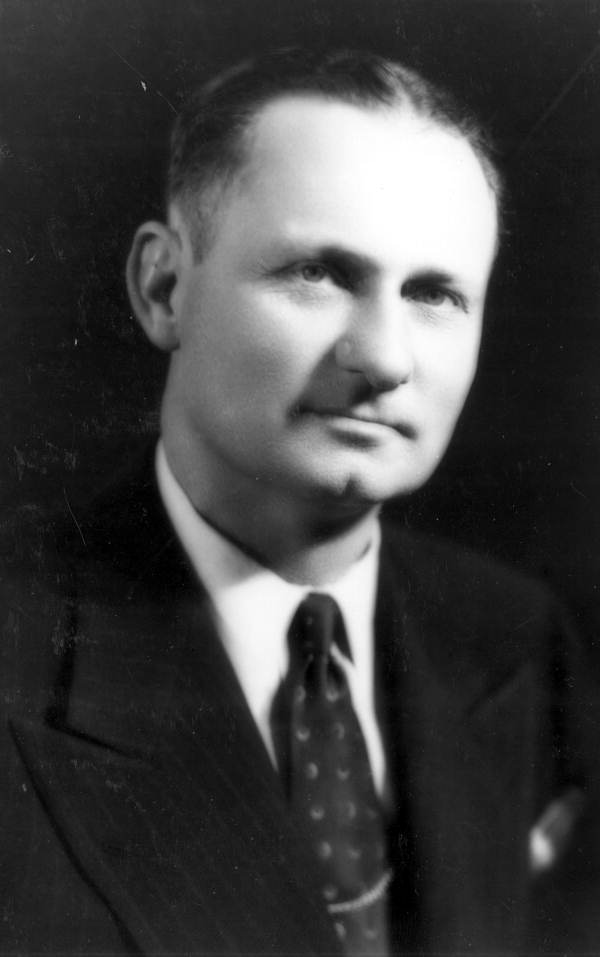
Portrait of Florida House Representative Elmer B. Elliott - Pahokee, Florida

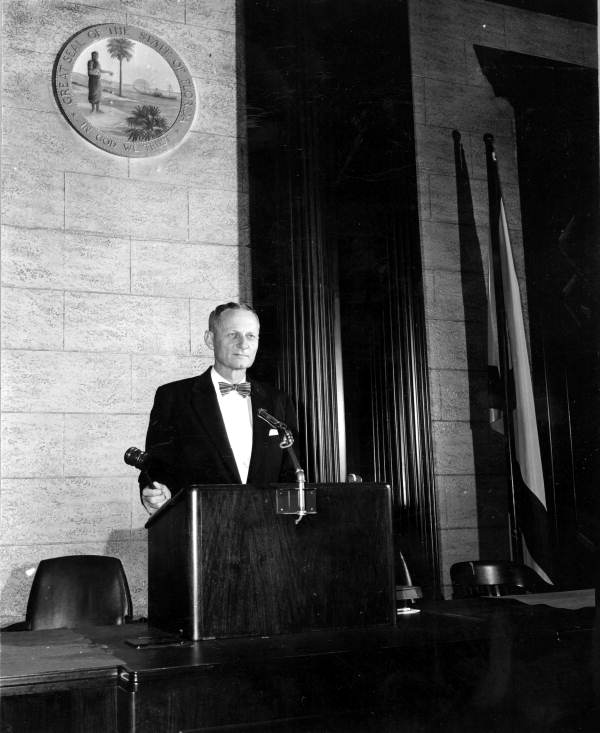
Former House Speaker Elmer B. Elliott addressing the legislature - Tallahassee, Florida

Elmer B. Elliott (March 13, 1902 – September 22, 1960) was Speaker of the Florida House in 1951 and 1952. and served in the Florida House of Representatives for 10 years from 1945 until 1955.

== Life ==
Elliott was born in Belfalls, Texas, on March 13, 1902, and moved to Florida in 1921. He was an automobile dealer and rancher in Pahokee, Florida, and served on the city commission.

Elliott represented Palm Beach County in the House from 1945 until the 1953 term.

The Florida archives have a photograph of Elmer Elliott and his sons from 1959 on the occasion of his Florida House portrait unveiling. The archives also have a 1957 photo of him by Charles Lee Barron (1917 - 1997) addressing the House. He died September 22, 1960, in Lake Worth hospital, leaving behind his wife Velva, a daughter, and three sons, one also called Elmer B. Elliott.

== See also ==
- List of speakers of the Florida House of Representatives
