= Sumter de Leon Lowry Jr. =

American National Guard officer (1893–1985)

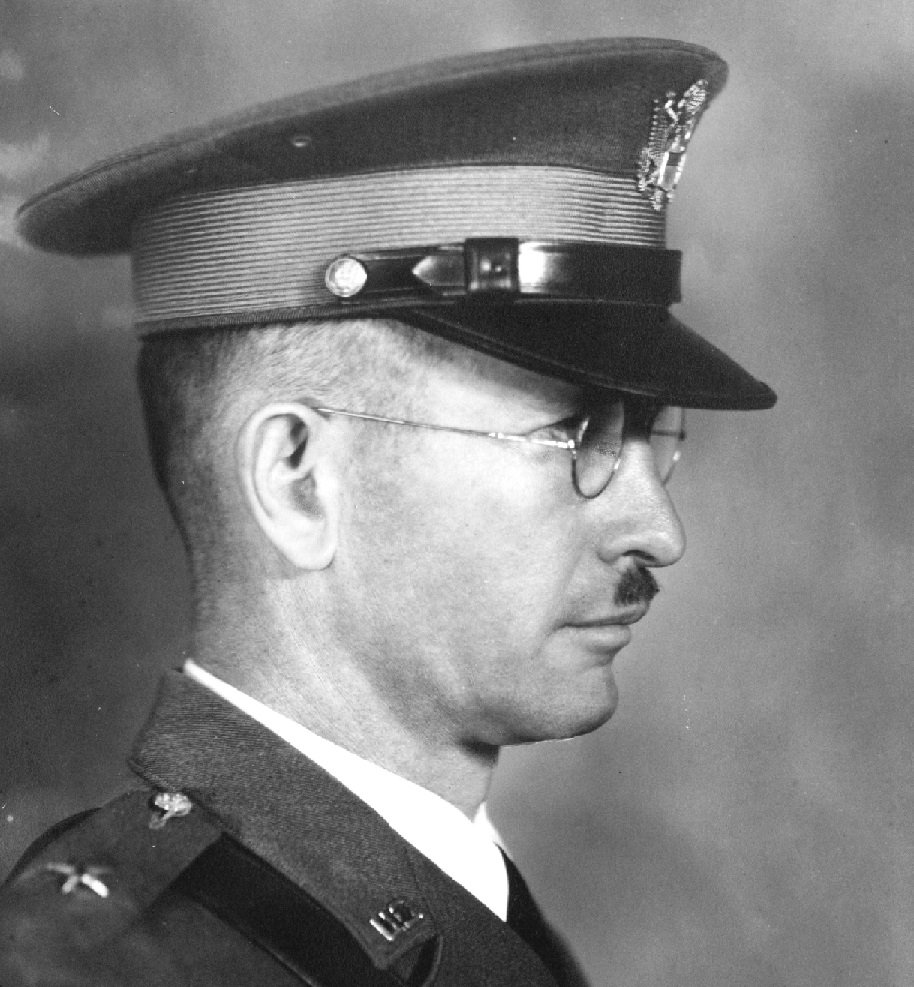
- Lowry as a brigadier general, circa 1936
- Born: August 27, 1893; St. Augustine, Florida, U.S.
- Died: February 3, 1985 (aged 91); Tampa, Florida, U.S.
- Burial place: Woodlawn Cemetery, Tampa, Florida
- Alma mater: Virginia Military Institute
- Spouse(s): Elizabeth Bellamy Parkhill (m. 1916; died 1942) Ivilyn Ingram (m. 1945)
- Children: 5
- Military career
- Allegiance: United States; Florida
- Branch: United States Army
- Service years: 1914–1952
- Rank: Major General (National Guard); Lieutenant General (Florida, retired list)
- Unit: Florida National Guard
- Commands: Company H, 2nd Florida Infantry Regiment; Company H, 124th Infantry Regiment; Company I, 331st Infantry Regiment; 2nd Battalion, 124th Infantry Regiment; 1st Battalion, 116th Field Artillery Regiment; Benjamin Field Military Post; 116th Field Artillery Regiment; 56th Artillery Brigade, 31st Infantry Division; 31st Infantry Division Artillery; 51st Infantry Division
- Conflicts: Pancho Villa Expedition; World War I: Occupation of the Rhineland; World War II: Dutch East Indies campaign; New Guinea campaign
- Awards: Army Distinguished Service Medal; Bronze Star Medal
- Other work: Insurance executive

Sumter de Leon Lowry Jr. (August 27, 1893 – February 3, 1985) was an American insurance executive, National Guard officer, and political candidate from Florida. A veteran of the Pancho Villa Expedition, World War I, and World War II, he is best known for his service as commander of several units in the Florida National Guard. Lowry served in the military for 38 years and attained the rank of major general. Apart from his military service, he is remembered for his opposition to racial integration, on which he based his unsuccessful 1956 campaign for governor of Florida.

A native of St. Augustine, Florida, Lowry was raised in Tampa, where his father served as a member of the city commission. He was educated in Tampa, and was a 1914 graduate of Virginia Military Institute. After graduation, Lowry began his long association with the United States Army by joining the Florida National Guard and organizing a new unit, Company H, 2nd Infantry Regiment, which he commanded as a captain. Lowry served with his unit on the Texas–Mexico border during the Pancho Villa Expedition in 1916–1917. The 2nd Florida Infantry was federalized for wartime service as the 124th Infantry, and sent to France as replacement soldiers. Lowry served with the unit in the U.S. then went to France as commander of Company I, 331st Infantry. The Armistice occurred before his company saw combat, and he performed post–war occupation duty until returning home in early 1919. After the war, he participated in the Florida National Guard's reorganization by helping organize the 116th Field Artillery Regiment, which he eventually commanded as a colonel. Lowry also began a career in the insurance industry in the early 1920s, and was the longtime chairman of the board of the Gulf Life Insurance Company. In 1934, he was promoted to brigadier general as commander of the 56th Artillery Brigade, a unit of the 31st Infantry Division.

Lowry was among the Florida National Guard members activated for World War II; he commanded the 31st Infantry Division Artillery, and participated in the Dutch East Indies and New Guinea campaigns, for which he received the Bronze Star Medal and other awards. After returning to Florida after the war, Lowry aided in the state's post–war National Guard reorganization, and was assigned to command the 51st Infantry Division as a major general. He retired from the military in 1952; in addition to receiving the Army Distinguished Service Medal, he received a state promotion to lieutenant general on Florida's retired list in recognition of his many years of service.

An ardent anti–communist and a believer in racial segregation, Lowry regarded the civil rights movement of the 1950s and 1960s as an extension of a plot to spread communism throughout the world. In 1956, he was a candidate for the Democratic nomination for governor of Florida. Running on the single issue of maintaining school segregation, Lowry failed to gain much traction, and was defeated by incumbent LeRoy Collins, who went on to win the general election. In 1962, he made a run for the United States House of Representatives in a newly created Tampa–based district. Running on a segregationist platform, he lost the Democratic nomination to Sam Gibbons, who went on to win the general election.

In retirement, Lowry continued to reside in Tampa. He died there on February 3, 1985, and was buried in Woodlawn Cemetery in Tampa.

== Childhood ==
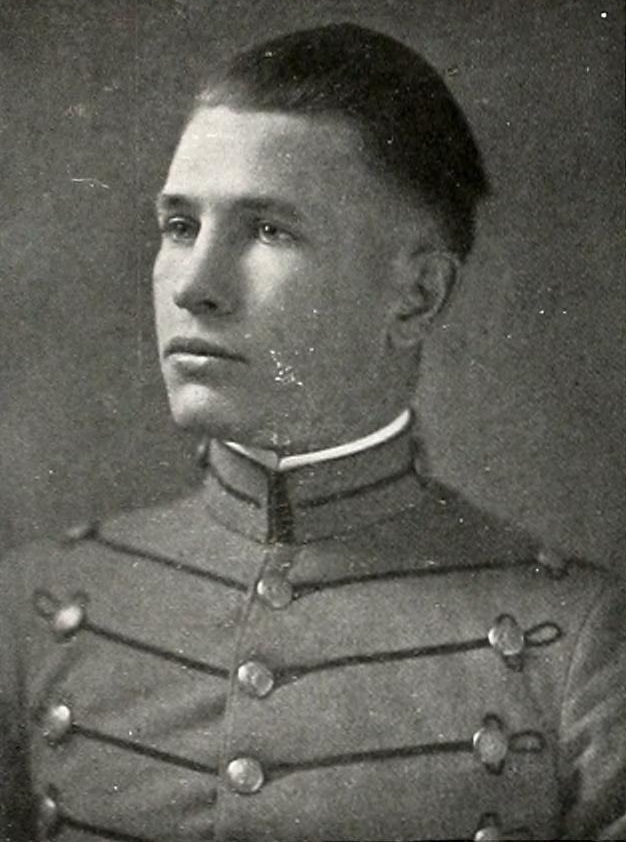
Lowry as a senior cadet at VMI, 1914

Lowry was born in St. Augustine, Florida; his parents were Sumter de Leon Lowry Sr. (1861–1936), and Willie Miller Lowry (1862–1946). The family moved to Tampa when he was an infant, and the senior Lowry became a successful businessman. Lowry Sr. and his wife became active in a host of Tampa area civic causes and historical projects, including leadership roles in the Sons of Confederate Veterans and Daughters of the Confederacy. Lowry Sr. was also an advocate for establishing a city commission government for Tampa; when his initiative succeeded in the early 1920s, he won election to the city commission and served from 1922 to 1928. Lowry Sr. also made an unsuccessful run for the U.S. House in 1932. The Lowry family's contributions to Tampa's civic life were recognized in 1925, when the city named a newly created city park Lowry Park in honor of Sumter Lowry Sr.

The younger Lowry was educated in Tampa, and was a 1911 graduate of Hillsborough High School. He then attended the Virginia Military Institute (VMI), from which he graduated in 1914. Lowry was a standout student at VMI, serving as a cadet captain, starting on the football team, and serving as captain of the basketball team. At graduation, he was ranked first in his class of 75, which resulted in the offer of a commission in the United States Army, which he declined.

== Civilian career ==
Lowry's father was active in the insurance industry, and Lowry Jr. followed Lowry Sr. into the business He was a district agent for the National Life Insurance Company of Chicago and represented the Aetna Casualty and Security Company and other insurers. Lowry served as president of the Victory National Insurance Company from 1921 until 1928, when it merged with the Gulf Life Insurance Company. He moved from Tampa to Jacksonville in 1929, and came back to Tampa after returning to Florida following his World War II military service. Lowry remained with Gulf Life until 1959, and after selling a large portion of the company's assets to Clint Murchison Jr. and John D. Murchison, he remained on the board of directors. Lowry was "exceedingly successful as a businessman" and his other ventures included real estate development in Florida and nearby states, and serving as chairman of the board for both Jacksonville's Bushnell Steel Company and Havana's Cuban American Metal Distributors.

Lowry wrote two pieces for Review of Reviews in the early 1930s, in which he argued in favor of a proposed cross–Florida ship canal, "A Florida Ship Canal" and "A Canal Across Florida".

== Military career ==
=== Early years ===
Lowry began his military career after his VMI graduation in 1914 by assisting in the creation of Company H, 2nd Florida Infantry, which he was elected to command with the rank of captain. He served with his regiment on the Texas-Mexico border during the Pancho Villa Expedition of 1916–1917.

=== World War I ===
When the 2nd Florida Infantry was federalized for service in World War I, Lowry served with the newly designated 124th Infantry as commander of Company H during pre–mobilization training at Camp Wheeler, Georgia. 124th Infantry soldiers were sent from Camp Wheeler to Camp Mills, New York for embarkation to France as replacement troops for units already in combat, and as commander of the regiment's 2nd Battalion, Lowry was part of a small cadre that remained in the United States with the intent of receiving and training new recruits. In October, he deployed to France as commander of Company I, 331st Infantry Regiment, a unit of the 83rd Division. The Armistice of November 11, 1918 ended the war before Lowry saw active combat, and he commanded his company during post–war occupation duty until January 1919, when he returned to the United States. He was mustered out of federal service at Fort Oglethorpe, Georgia in February and returned to Tampa.

=== American Legion founder ===
Lowry was an early proponent of the American Legion, and when each state was requested to nominate individuals to serve as the national organization's official incorporators, Herbert J. Drane nominated Lowry to represent Florida, who then attended the Legion's first organizational meeting. The national organization recruited him to oversee creation of its Florida department, and he was chosen as the department's first adjutant, a post he held from 1919 to 1921. He was then elected commander of the Florida department, which he headed from 1921 to 1923.

=== Post–World War I ===
After the war Lowry was one of the organizers of the Florida National Guard's 116th Field Artillery Regiment. After commanding the regiment's 1st Battalion as a major, he commanded the Benjamin Field Military Post as a lieutenant colonel, then commanded the regiment from 1923 to 1934 with the rank of colonel. In 1934 he was promoted to brigadier general as commander of 56th Artillery Brigade, 31st Division.

In the 1930s and 1940s, Lowry authored several articles on military topics for professional journals. Among these were "The 116th Field Artillery Makes History" (The Field Artillery Journal, Jan.–Feb. 1936, pp. 88–89) and "Is This Perfection?" (The Field Artillery Journal, Sep.–Oct. 1937, pp. 333–336).

=== World War II ===
During World War II, Lowry commanded the 31st Division Artillery. He led the organization during training at several posts in the United States before deploying to the Pacific Theater in 1944. Lowry's unit took part in the Dutch East Indies and New Guinea campaigns against the Japanese, and returned home in early 1945. After returning to the United States, Lowry served as assistant commandant of the Infantry Replacement Training Center at Camp Livingston, Louisiana until he was discharged from active duty following the end of the war. Lowry's wartime service was recognized with award of the Army Distinguished Service Medal and Bronze Star Medal.

=== Post–World War II ===
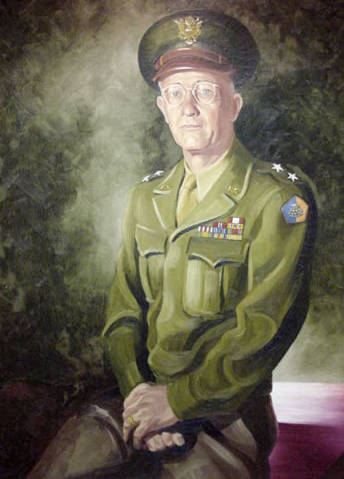
Lowry as commander of the 51st Infantry Division, circa 1951 (artist unknown).

From 1946 until his 1952 retirement, Lowry commanded the 51st Infantry Division as a major general. The newly organized division was made up of units from Florida and South Carolina, and Lowry commanded during its initial organization, equipping, and training. At his retirement, he received a state promotion to lieutenant general (three stars) on Florida's retired list in recognition of his long years of military service.

=== Awards and decorations ===
In addition to the Distinguished Service Medal and Bronze Star Medal, Lowry's other decorations included the Mexican Border Service Medal, World War I Victory Medal, American Defense Service Medal, Asiatic–Pacific Campaign Medal, and World War II Victory Medal.

=== Distinguished Service Medal citation ===
The citation for Lowry's Distinguished Service Medal read:

For exceptional meritorious and distinguished service to the government in a position of great responsibility from November 1940 to September 1944, when he was artillery commander of the Thirty-first Infantry Division, a National Guard unit from Florida, Alabama, Mississippi, and Louisiana. In March, 1942, although seriously handicapped by loss of key officers and non-commissioned officers to other organizations, he directed the division artillery in completing the Army Ground Forces tests with a rank of first in the corps and fourth in the entire U.S. Army. His highly efficient direction of amphibious and mountain training prior to overseas movement resulted in eminently successful artillery employment against the Japanese at Maffin Bay, New Guinea from July to September 1944. Again on the island of Morotai, Dutch East Indies, at about H plus 1, he landed the division artillery with great skill and aggressiveness, overcoming tremendous difficulties. Gen. Lowry's brilliant record as an unusually capable leader, organizer and tactician was a material contribution to the combat readiness of his division and was a substantial factor in the success of military operations.
Service: Army Rank: Brigadier General General Orders: War Department, General Orders No. 20 (1945)

== Political views ==
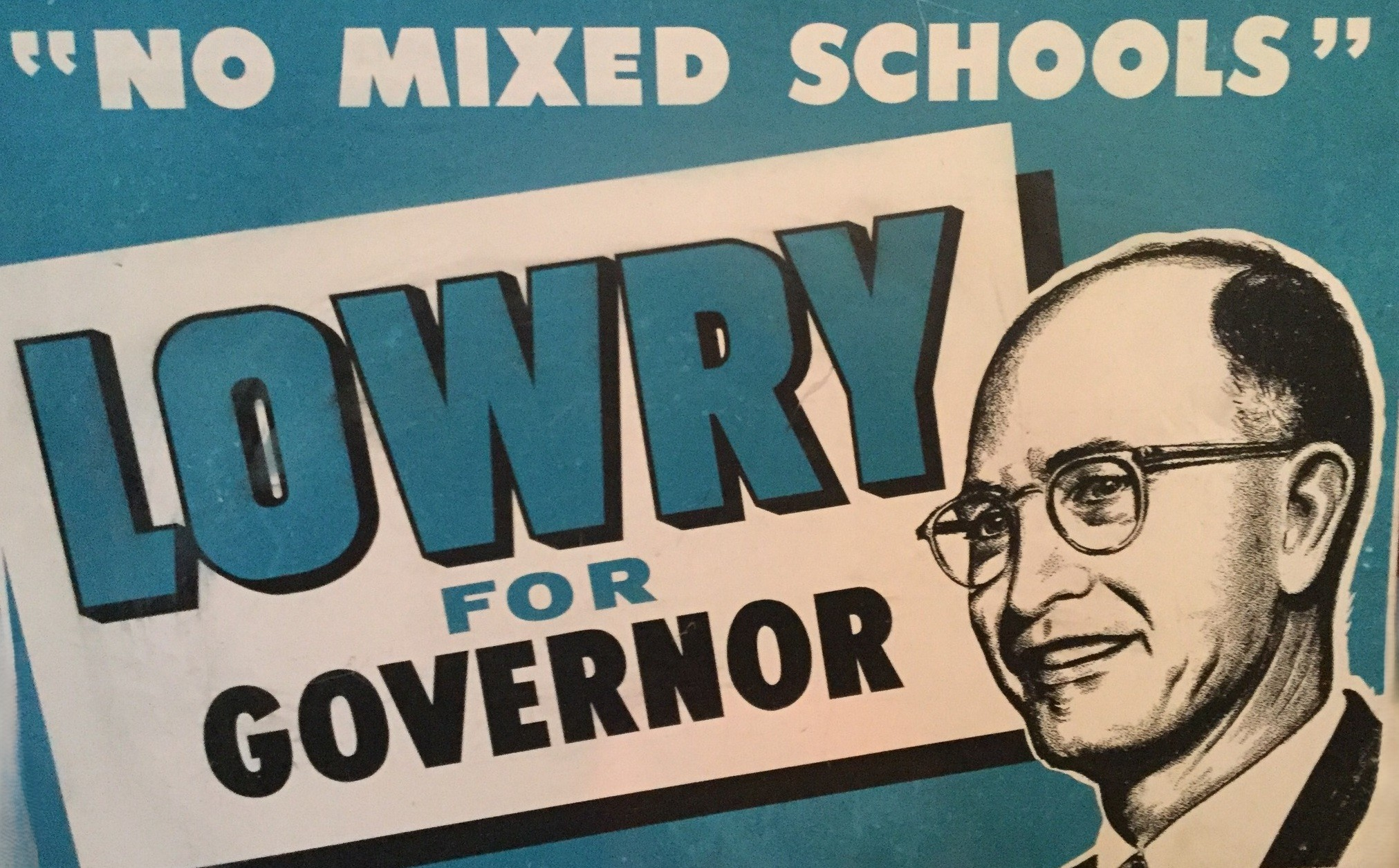
Campaign sign from Lowry's 1956 campaign for Florida governor

=== Opposition to the United Nations, communism, and civil rights ===
Lowry's first political activity was his post–World War II opposition to the creation of the United Nations. In addition, Lowry regarded the civil rights movement of the 1950s and 60s as part of an international plot to spread communism worldwide. As he expressed it in a January 11, 1956, address to the Duval County Democratic Executive Committee, just before he announced his candidacy for governor:

Our great nation was created by white men. It was shaped out of the customs and the culture of the white race by many generations of our people. It will continue to live as a white race, or it will perish as a mongrel race! ...Any white person knows that to mingle little white and colored children together in schools or playgrounds or pools means intermarriage, and soon! The mixing of the races in churches or movies or dance halls means mongrelization! The communists know this!

=== Opposition to school integration and campaign for governor (1956) ===
Lowry was described in a 1956 news article as a "popeyed patriot" who displayed a "rabid brand of racism".

He ran for governor in 1956 on the single issue of maintaining school segregation, which had become an issue due to the 1954 Brown v. Board of Education decision. He was supported by the Ku Klux Klan, but his "principal supporter" was Florida businessman Ed Ball. According to contemporary accounts, Lowry was "responsible for injecting the segregation question into the [1956] campaign" and "saw desegregation as part of the 'international Communist conspiracy." He attacked one candidate, former governor Fuller Warren, for allowing black guests in the governor's mansion, and published a picture of the current governor LeRoy Collins, who Lowry claimed "caught the Moscow train shortly after World War II", shaking hands with a black man.

Lowry broadened his platform as the campaign went on, including "roads...school facilities...tourists...industry" but continued to argue that integration "will create the biggest economic disaster in the history of Florida"; and continued segregation was "the greatest issue before the people in the last 100 years". Collins dismissed Lowry's candidacy, saying that "Lowry was a man 'who admittedly knows nothing of the vast problems and issues with which he would be confronted in this important office, a man who pitches his entire campaign on his ability by lies and misrepresentations to incite hate and anarchy and disorder and violence.'" In an election that was watched nationally for signs of moderation on race and civil rights as a viable approach, Collins demonstrated its strength by soundly defeating Lowry in the Democratic primary and going on to win the general election.

=== Campaign for Congress (1962) ===
In 1962, Lowry was a candidate for U.S. Representative in the newly created 10th Congressional District. Running on a segregationist platform, Lowry finished second of five candidates in the Democratic primary, which advanced him to a runoff against first–place finisher Sam Gibbons. Gibbons was solidly liberal, while Lowry was backed by conservatives from across Florida. The other three primary candidates all endorsed Gibbons, who went on to defeat Lowry in the runoff and win the seat.

=== Continued political activity ===
After his Congressional campaign, Lowry organized and financed the Florida Coalition of Patriotic Societies. This organization created and distributed materials warning about the dangers it perceived in communism and the United Nations, which it argued were attempting to eliminate U.S. sovereignty and establish a single worldwide government. Lowry authored some of these works himself, including 1965's America's Book of Infamy, a pamphlet form of an open letter he wrote to President Lyndon B. Johnson detailing over 100 supposed insults to the honor of the United States, and demanding that the United States retaliate or risk losing its standing in the world. Lowry was also active in other right–wing organizations, including the John Birch Society, the Christian Crusade of Billy James Hargis, the Federation for Constitutional Government, and the Liberty Lobby.

== Retirement and death ==
In retirement, Lowry continued to reside in Tampa. He maintained an interest in state government as a member of the Florida Canal Authority. He was also active in efforts to improve Tampa and preserve his family's legacy, including purchasing an elephant in 1960, which he donated to the Lowry Park Zoo. Lowry and other family members also established several charities that work to better Tampa, including the Sumter & Ivilyn Lowry Charitable Foundation, the Sumter L. Lowry Foundation, and the Lowry Murphey Family Foundation. Among other endeavors, the Sumter L. Lowry Foundation maintains Mount Lyn Lowry, a mountain and mountaintop memorial to Lowry's daughter in Haywood County, North Carolina. Lowry died in Tampa on February 3, 1985, and was buried at Woodlawn Cemetery in Tampa.

== Legacy ==
Lowry was the recipient of the honorary degree of Doctor of Humanities from Trinity College of Florida, which was awarded in 1966. (Note: Some Lowry obituaries indicate he received an honorary degree from the University of Tampa. According to the university's public information staff, Lowry did not receive an honorary degree from that school and the obituaries are incorrect.)

In 1974, Tampa's Civitan International Club named Lowry the city's "Man of the Year". In announcing the award, the club's spokesman said Civitan selected Lowry in recognition of his many years of service to the community, including his military experience, civic and charitable efforts, and work to promote patriotism and anticommunism.

Lowry was named Virginia Military Institute's Distinguished Alumni for 1974. He also endowed VMI's Sumter L. Lowry Award. VMI presents an annual award, The Society of the Cincinnati Medal, to a top performing cadet, and Lowry was the 1914 recipient. VMI's Lowry Award is one of several that provide a cash prize to the recipient of the Cincinnati Medal. In addition, Lowry was the creator of the Florida National Guard's Lowry Award, which is presented annually to the organization's top company grade officer (captain or lieutenant). Lowry also endowed the Lowry Freedom Award at the University of Tampa for presentation to each year's top performing Reserve Officers' Training Corps cadet.

In 1986, the Florida National Guard constructed an armory in Plant City, Florida. The armory was named after Lowry in 1991 and underwent renovation in 2013 and 2014.

== Family ==
In 1916 he married Elizabeth Bellamy Parkhill (1896–1942), and their children included: Helen (1917–1918); Elizabeth (Betty) (1920–1925); Sumter (1924–2000); and Ann (1934–2005), the wife of David R. Murphey III. In 1945, Lowry married Ivilyn Ingram (1903–1988), whom he met while he was stationed at Camp Livingston. They were the parents of a daughter, Ivilyn (Lyn) (1947–1962).

== Archival material ==
- Lowry Papers, Special and Digital Collections, University of South Florida Tampa Library (27 boxes).
- Sumter Lowry Currency Collection, University of South Florida — Tampa Library.
- Sumter L. Lowry scrapbook, Virginia Military Institute Library.
