= LeRoy Collins =

American politician (1909–1991)

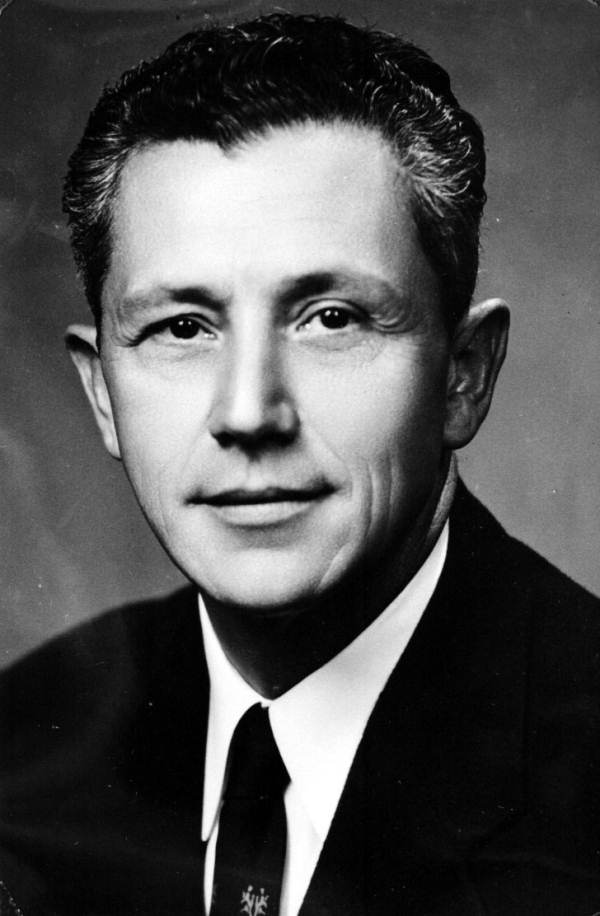

33rd Governor of Florida
- In office January 4, 1955 – January 3, 1961
- Preceded by: Charley Eugene Johns
- Succeeded by: C. Farris Bryant

Chair of the National Governors Association
- In office May 18, 1958 – June 25, 1959
- Preceded by: William Stratton
- Succeeded by: J. Caleb Boggs

Member of the Florida Senate from the 8th district
- In office 1946–1954
- Preceded by: Charles S. Ausley
- Succeeded by: Wilson Carraway
- In office 1940–1943
- Succeeded by: Charles S. Ausley

Member of the Florida House of Representatives
- In office 1934–1940

Personal details
- Born: Thomas LeRoy Collins; March 10, 1909 Tallahassee, Florida, U.S.
- Died: March 12, 1991 (aged 82) Tallahassee, Florida, U.S.
- Party: Democratic
- Spouse: Mary Call Darby (m. 1932)
- Education: Eastman Business College; Cumberland University (LLB)
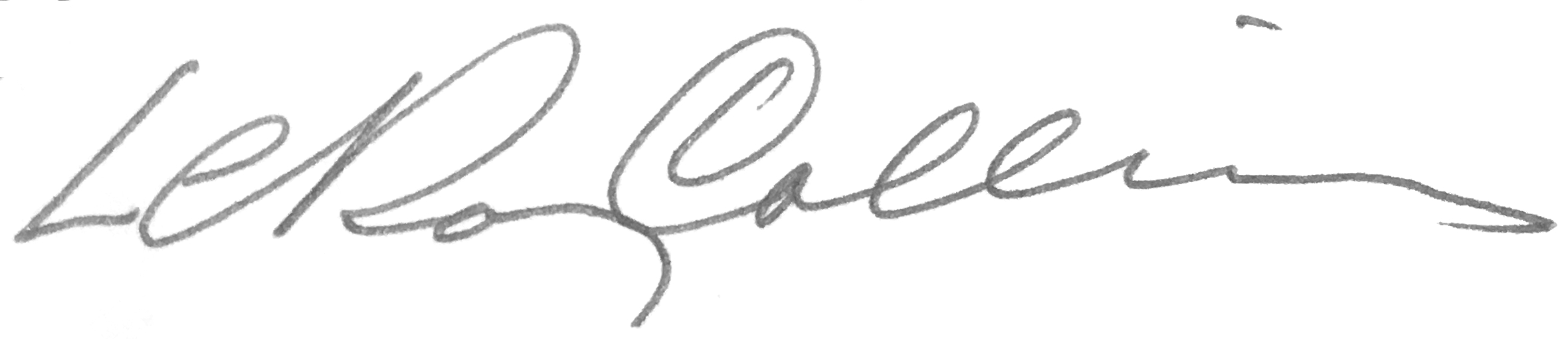
- Signature

Military service
- Allegiance: United States
- Branch/service: United States Navy
- Years of service: 1944–1946
- Rank: Lieutenant
- Unit: 13th Naval District (Seattle, Washington)
- Battles/wars: World War II

Thomas LeRoy Collins (March 10, 1909 – March 12, 1991) was an American politician who served as the 33rd governor of Florida from 1955 to 1961. Collins began his governorship after winning a special election in 1954, and was elected to a four-year term in 1956.

Prior to winning election as governor, Collins served several terms in the Florida House of Representatives and Senate. He was the first governor from the South to promote ending segregation. Described as moderate or moderate to progressive, he counseled "progress under law," a moderate course in favor of incremental improvements during the 1950s and 1960s and is remembered as a voice in favor of civil rights.

== Early life ==
Collins, "an example of the poor boy made good," was born and raised in Tallahassee, Florida, son of a "neighborhood grocer". He attended Leon High School. He went on to attend Eastman Business College in Poughkeepsie, New York, and then the Cumberland School of Law, at that time in Lebanon, Tennessee, where he earned a law degree. In 1932, he married Mary Call Darby, great-granddaughter of Richard K. Call, twice territorial governor of Florida.

== Start of career ==
=== Political start ===
Collins was first elected to public office in 1934, as Leon County's representative to the Florida House of Representatives. He continued to serve in the House until 1940, when he was elected to the Florida Senate to fill an unexpired term of the late William Hodges.

In 1941, he purchased The Grove Plantation, the house built by Richard K. Call in Tallahassee across the street from the Governor's Mansion. Re-elected to the Senate in 1942, Collins resigned to join the military for World War II.

=== Military service ===
Collins attempted to enlist in 1943, but was rejected by the United States Navy because of his age. In 1944, he was accepted and received his commission as a lieutenant junior grade. He attended officer training first in Hollywood, Florida, and then in Princeton, New Jersey. Originally slated for assignment to a unit that would oversee post-war rebuilding of countries previously held by the Japanese, he began training in the Chinese language in Monterey, California. When the unit was disbanded, Collins was transferred to the Navy's judge advocate general corps. He was posted to the 13th Naval District headquarters in Seattle, Washington, where he was assigned as an attorney for Navy boards and courts. Collins was discharged from active duty as a lieutenant in March 1946, and returned to Florida to resume his legal and political career.

=== Return to politics ===
After the war, in 1946 he was elected again to the Florida Senate. He was re-elected in 1950, serving until 1954. That year a special election was held to fill the remaining two years in the term of Governor Daniel T. McCarty, who had died in office in 1953.

Collins twice received the title of "Most Valuable Senator" (the first time in 1947 by the Capital Press Corps and in 1953 by fellow lawmakers).

== Governorship ==
Governor McCarty died on September 28, 1953, just nine months after assuming office, having suffered a debilitating heart attack on February 25. At that time, Florida had no lieutenant governor, and the president of the Florida Senate, Charley Eugene Johns, became acting governor to serve until a special election.

Collins challenged Johns in the 1954 Democratic primary election and won the nomination. Due to the disenfranchisement of most blacks in the South, the Democratic Party dominated regional politics and a primary win nearly guaranteed victory in the general election. Collins was sworn in as governor on January 4, 1955. In 1956, he was reelected to serve a regular four-year term, Collins was the first governor of Florida to serve two consecutive terms.

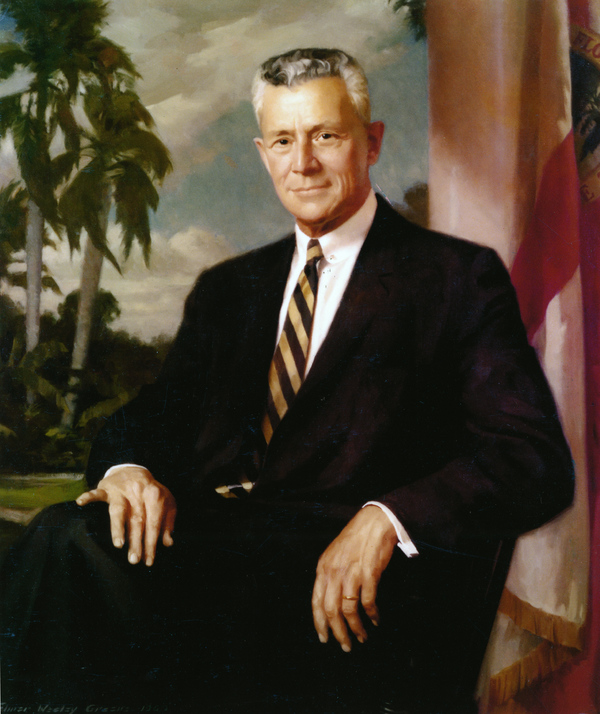
Painted portrait of Governor LeRoy Collins.

In the 1956 election, Collins made history by becoming the first governor to win the Democratic nomination without a runoff election, defeating segregationist Sumter de Leon Lowry Jr. and four other Democrats with over 51 percent of the vote. During his term, Collins focused on education, working to strengthen the state's school system. In the racial unrest caused by the Civil Rights Movement seeking enforcement of constitutional rights, he took a moderate course, counseling obedience to the law, though gradually, to avoid disruption. The state had minimal disorder compared to other states in the Deep South.

Although he initially condemned the US Supreme Court decision in Brown v. Board of Education (1954), as did almost all Southern elected officials, he fought with the Florida Legislature to try to prevent them from passing an "interposition" resolution. This indicated the intent of the legislature to "interpose" itself between the citizens of Florida and the United States government to prevent what the legislature contended was an illegal intrusion upon the right of the state by imposing integration.

Collins prevented passage of the resolution the first time by using his power under Section 10 of Article Four of the state constitution to unilaterally adjourn the legislature. After the legislature returned and passed the resolution, Collins could not veto it, because it was not a proposed law but only a resolution expressing the sentiments of the legislature.

When the interposition resolution reached his office, Collins noted on it the following, in his own handwriting:

This concurrent resolution of 'Interposition' crosses the Governor's desk as a matter of routine. I have no authority to veto it. I take this means however to advise the student of government, who may examine this document in the archives of the state in the years to come, that the Governor of Florida expressed open and vigorous opposition thereto. I feel that the U. S. Supreme Court has improperly usurped powers reserved to the states under the constitution. I have joined in protesting such and in seeking legal means of avoidance. But if this resolution declaring the decisions of the court to be 'null and void' is to be taken seriously, it is anarchy and rebellion against the nation which must remain 'indivisible under God' if it is to survive. Not only will I not condone 'interposition' as so many have sought me to do, I decry it as an evil thing, whipped up by the demagogues and carried on the hot and erratic winds of passion, prejudice, and hysteria. If history judges me right this day, I want it known that I did my best to avert this blot. If I am judged wrong, then here in my own handwriting and over my signature is the proof of guilt to support my conviction.

— "LeRoy Collins, Governor." May 2, 1957.

The document is held by the State Archives of Florida.

In 1955, Collins personally reviewed the case of the Groveland Four, a case that had been unjust to four black men. Two of these men had been murdered during the case, an underage boy was given life in prison, and Walter Irvin was sentenced to death for a rape where there was little to no evidence against him. Collins decided to commute Irvin's sentence to life in prison, explaining: "My conscience told me it was a bad case, badly handled, badly tried ... I was asked to take a man's life. My conscience would not let me do it."

Collins became Chairman of the Southern Governors' Association in 1957.

Collins fell just a few votes short of persuading the first Constitution Revision Commission to send an amendment to voters to abolish capital punishment in the state. He later recalled that he worked for the amendment because every time an execution was carried out under his order, it left him feeling nearly as guilty as the murderers. His two immediate successors, C. Farris Bryant and Haydon Burns, also opposed the death penalty.

=== Speech on race relations, March 20, 1960 ===
Though Collins is now remembered as a voice for civil rights, in his campaign for Florida's governorship he had identified as a staunch segregationist who regarded the practice as "part and parcel of our way of life." Yet biographer Martin Dyckman argues that, in his speeches and statements, Collins never extolled segregation as a virtue, but defended it legalistically. For instance, although he took issue with the Supreme Court's ruling in Brown v. Board of Education, he acknowledged the court's authority. By 1957 Collins was expressing doubts that whites would universally react negatively to integration (though he still criticized the NAACP for "forcing the issue").

Tensions were mounting in Tallahassee as 1960 neared. Bus boycotts and lunch counter sit-ins were taking place in Tallahassee and across Florida. On March 20, 1960, against the advice of his friends, Collins gave an impassioned speech about his conviction that as governor he represented all the people of Florida, "whether that person is black or white, whether that person is rich or poor, or whether that person is influential or not influential." He was the first southern governor to speak so frankly in support of the moral necessity of the end of segregation. His speech generated hundreds of responses, mostly positive, from citizens across the state.

Collins' reputation as a moderate secured him the chairmanship of the 1960 Democratic National Convention. Some historians believed he had a good chance for the vice-presidential nomination, but the party nominated Lyndon Johnson in order to win Texas voters to support the ticket with John F. Kennedy from Boston.

=== Presidential and vice-presidential possibilities ===
During the 1956 Democratic National Convention, Collins was among contenders for the vice presidential nomination, when presidential nominee Adlai Stevenson II allowed the convention to choose his running-mate. Collins received 29 votes on the first ballot.

Before the 1960 presidential election, Collins was seriously considered as a possible candidate because of his popularity as a Southern governor. He was also acceptable to Northern liberals because of his support for civil rights. But he did not seek the nomination, even in the Florida primary, which went to favorite son candidate Senator George Smathers.

=== Chairman of the 1960 Democratic National Convention ===
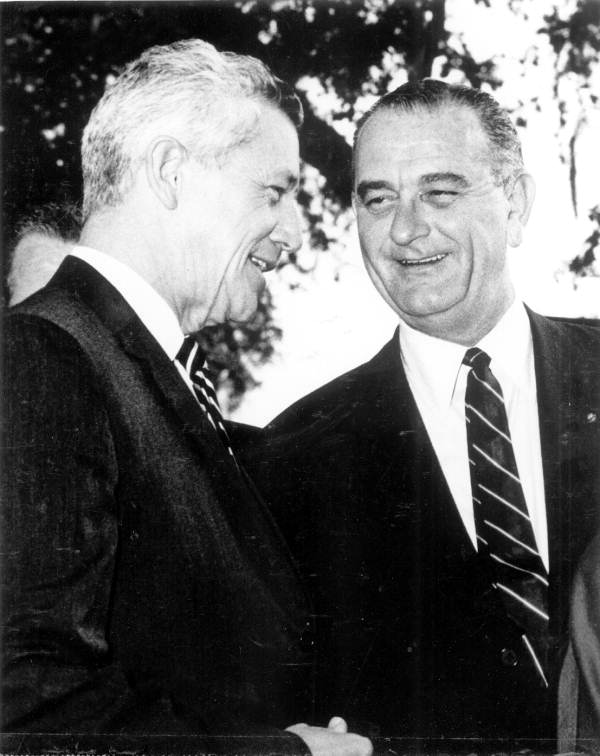
Collins with Lyndon B. Johnson on October 13, 1960

Collins served as chairman of the 1960 Democratic National Convention, which nominated Senator John F. Kennedy of Massachusetts for President and Senate Majority Leader Lyndon B. Johnson of Texas for Vice President.

== Post-governorship ==
Upon completion of six years as governor, he became president of the National Association of Broadcasters. While at the National Association of Broadcasters he He resigned this at the request of President Lyndon B. Johnson to become the first Director of the Community Relations Service under the 1964 Civil Rights Act. Also by presidential appointment, he became United States Under Secretary of Commerce on July 7, 1965. He resigned the following year going back to private practice in Tampa.

In 1968, he was nominated by the Democratic Party for the United States Senate seat vacated by fellow Democrat George Smathers. However, he lost the general election to Republican U.S. Representative Edward Gurney. Gurney partisans distributed a photograph of Collins walking alongside the Reverend Martin Luther King Jr., during the second of the March 1965 Selma to Montgomery marches in Alabama. The photograph contained no caption or other explanation of why Collins was in Selma. In fact, Collins had not participated in the march, but had shuttled back and forth between the marchers and the Alabama authorities to pursue a compromise to avoid a repeat of the violence perpetrated two days earlier, by state troopers and a deputized county posse, on the county side of the Edmund Pettus Bridge during the "Bloody Sunday" march. He conducted these negotiations as a part of his job as head of the Community Relations Service, at the behest of President Lyndon B. Johnson. He succeeded, as the marchers were allowed to cross the bridge, pray, and return to the other side, completing the "Turnaround Tuesday" march.

A death penalty opponent, Collins participated in a protest against execution of John Spenkelink in 1979. This was the first post-Furman involuntary execution in the U.S. and the first in Florida since 1964. The protest was held outside the gubernatorial mansion he had once occupied. (Then-Governor Bob Graham let the execution proceed.)

After Collins' defeat in the Senate race, he left his law firm in Tampa and returned to "The Grove" in Tallahassee, where he lived until his death from cancer in 1991. He was called "the greatest Governor of Florida" by former governors Reubin Askew, Bob Graham, and Jeb Bush.

== Family ==
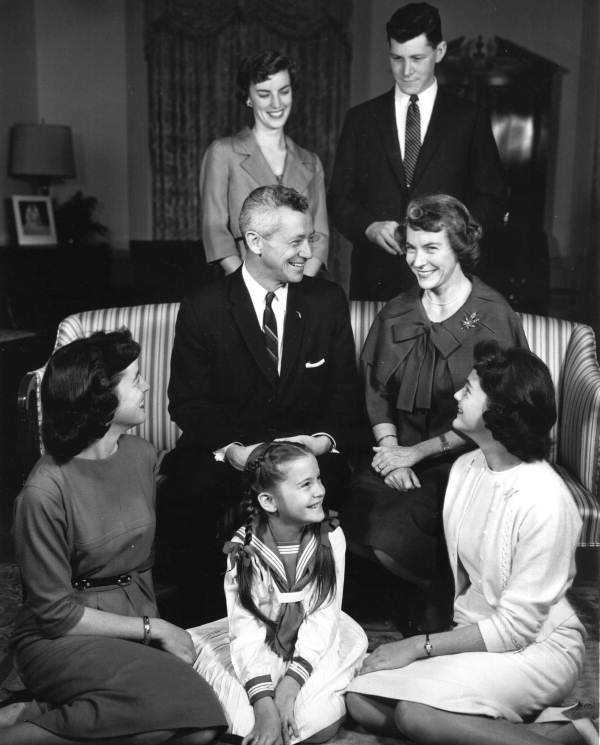
Governor LeRoy Collins surrounded by his family at the Governor's Mansion, in 1960.

His son, LeRoy Collins Jr., a retired United States Navy rear admiral, unsuccessfully sought the 2006 Republican nomination for the United States Senate from Florida, losing to Congresswoman Katherine Harris.

== Legacy and honors ==
- On March 19, 1991, a tribute was entered in the official record of the United States House of Representatives by Florida Representatives James Bacchus and Charles E. Bennett
- His papers are held by the University of South Florida, and a road on the university's Tampa campus is named after him
- The Leon County Public Library is named after him.
- Opening in 2017, the Governor LeRoy Collins Farm Park, situated on 84 acres of now undeveloped land in western Davie, Florida will be a public park devoted to agricultural education and open space. It will provide opportunities for experimental learning about agriculture

== Works ==
- Forerunners Courageous: Stories of Frontier Florida Colcade, Tallahassee, FL, 1971

Party political offices
Preceded by Daniel T. McCarty	Democratic nominee for Governor of Florida; 1954, 1956	Succeeded by C. Farris Bryant
Preceded by Sam Rayburn	Permanent Chair of the Democratic National Convention; 1960	Succeeded by John W. McCormack
Preceded by George Smathers	Democratic nominee for U.S. Senator from Florida (Class 3); 1968	Succeeded by Richard Stone
Political offices
Preceded by Charley Eugene Johns	Governor of Florida; 1955–1961	Succeeded by C. Farris Bryant
Preceded by William Stratton	Chair of the National Governors Association; 1958–1959	Succeeded by J. Caleb Boggs
