= Fred C. Petersen =

American politician (born 1908)

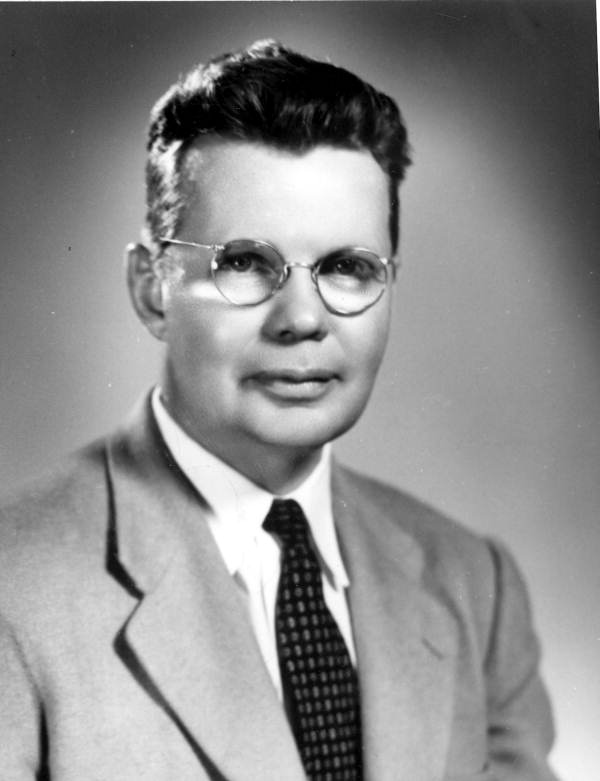
- Petersen in 1953

Member of the Florida House of Representatives from Pinellas County
- In office 1953–1957

Personal details
- Born: February 16, 1908 New York, U.S.
- Died: October 21, 1989 (aged 81)
- Party: Republican

Fred C. Petersen (February 16, 1908 – October 21, 1989) was an American politician. He served as Republican member of the Florida House of Representatives.

== Life and career ==
Petersen was born in New York. He was a real estate broker.

Petersen served in the Florida House of Representatives representing Pinellas County from 1953 to 1957.
