= Political party strength in Florida =

Politics in the US state of Florida

The state of Florida has historically been dominated by the Democratic party, with a brief period of Republican officeholders during Reconstruction, before becoming a core state of the Solid South. A dramatic reversal began in the late 20th century, with the 21st century having been dominated by Republicans.

== Party affiliation ==
=== Current ===
Party registration as of May 23, 2026
Party	Number of voters	Fraction
Republican	5,533,168	41.4%
Democratic	4,027,949	30.1%
No Party Affiliation	3,317,918	24.8%
Independent Party of Florida	315,225	2.4%
Conservative Party of Florida	41,339	0.3%
Libertarian	34,594	0.3%
America First Party of Florida	19,777	0.1%
Constitution	18,383	0.1%
Boricua Party	17,311	0.1%
Green	9,533	0.1%
Coalition with a Purpose	8,605	0.1%
American Solidarity Party	7,982	0.1%
Ecology Party of Florida	7,982	0.1%
Party for Socialism and Liberation	2,258	0.0%
Forward Party	1,909	0.0%
Jeffersonian	106	0.0%
MGTOW	61	0.0%
We the People	12	0.0%
Total	13,360,319	100.0%

=== Historically ===
Political party registration by year
Year	REP	DEM	IPF	LPF	CPF	GRE	REF	IDP	Others	Unaffiliated	Total
2024	5,499,717	4,421,790	276,467	35,964	19,708	9,089	188	–	70,075 (Note: "Other" political affiliations listed as follows: Conservative Party of Florida – 30,022; No Labels – 16,163; Boricua Party – 9,297; Coalition with a Purpose – 4,247; Ecology Party of Florida – 3,264; Party for Socialism and Liberation – 2,172; American Solidarity Party – 1,966; People's Party – 1,553; Forward Party – 735; Natural Law Party (United States) – 656)	3,616,170	13,949,168
2022	5,277,394	4,971,444	206,024	39,451	3,893	7,826	1,456	–	3,505 (Note: "Other" political affiliations listed as follows: Party for Socialism and Liberation – 1,604; Ecology Party of Florida – 1,253; People's Party – 579; Coalition with a Purpose – 69)	3,992,985	14,503,978
2020	5,169,012	5,303,254	163,406	39,538	2,492	7,335	1,474	–	2,072 (Note: "Other" political affiliations listed as follows: Party for Socialism and Liberation – 1157; Ecology Party of Florida – 915)	3,753,286	14,441,869
2018	4,681,598	4,944,867	58,413	32,843	1,724	6,915	1,407	–	1,209 (Note: "Other" political affiliations listed as follows: Party for Socialism and Liberation – 606; Ecology Party of Florida – 603)	3,549,094	13,278,070
2016	4,550,311	4,877,749	262,599	28,287	1,265	6,605	1,511	44,194	1,323 (Note: "Other" political affiliations listed as follows: America's Party of Florida – 768; Ecology Party of Florida – 314; Party for Socialism and Liberation – 241)	3,089,929	12,863,773
2014	4,172,232	4,628,178	268,358	23,665	1,142	5,901	1,717	49,112	2,681 (Note: "Other" political affiliations listed as follows: Florida Tea Party – 1264; America's Party of Florida – 607; Peace and Freedom – 306; Ecology Party of Florida – 191; Party for Socialism and Liberation – 127; Florida Socialist Worker's Party – 100; Justice Party – 86)	2,778,547	11,931,041
2012	4,245,991	4,781,978	248,671	19,892	974	5,705	1,961	55,074	1,299 (Note: "Other" political affiliations listed as follows: America's Party of Florida – 395; Florida Tea Party – 227; Florida Pirate Party – 214; Ecology Party of Florida – 151; Party for Socialism and Liberation – 108; Americans Elect – 103; Objectivist Party – 66; Florida Whig Party – 15; Florida Socialist Worker's Party – 10; Peace and Freedom – 10)	2,572,901	11,934,109
2010	4,039,259	4,631,068	262,116	17,888	1,112	5,827	2,473	57,761	13,634 (Note: "Other" political affiliations listed as follows: Independent Democrats – 7,703; Christian Party of Florida – 1,130; Veterans' Party of Florida – 826; Socialist Party of Florida – 584; Florida Tea Party – 514; Surfers' Party – 417; Family Values Party – 385; Socialist Worker's Party – 326; Faith and Patience – 312; American Reform Party – 219; America's Party of Florida – 205; American Party of Florida – 178; Unity '08 – 152; Florida Whig Party – 121; Ecology Party of Florida – 106; Progressive Libertarian Party – 106; Real Food Party – 82; Possibility Party – 79; Objectivist Party – 48; Prohibition Party – 44; British Reformed Sectarian Party – 38; Party for Socialism and Liberation – 21; Others – 38)	2,186,246	11,217,384
2008	4,064,301	4,722,076	253,520	16,883	982	6,007	3,093	63,415	13,756 (Note: "Other" political affiliations listed as follows: Independent Democrats – 7,767; Christian Party of Florida – 1,268; Veterans' Party of Florida – 932; Socialist Party of Florida – 614; Family Values Party – 429; Socialist Workers Party – 380; Faith and Patience – 385; Surfers' Party – 352; American Reform Party – 258; Poor People's Party – 236; Unity '08 – 161; American Party of Florida – 119; Ecology Party of Florida – 101; Progressive Libertarian Party – 96; Real Food Party – 88; Possibility Party – 84; Florida Whig Party – 59; Florida Tea Party – 51; Prohibition Party – 51; British Reformed Sectarian Party – 43; Objectivist Party – 40; Southern Party of Florida – 39; America's Party of Florida – 30; Term Limits for Congress Party – 8; Party for Socialism and Liberation – 7; America First Party – 640)	2,103,119	11,247,634
2006	3,935,675	4,219,531	237,990	15,533	847	6,607	3,790	39,791	9,962 (Note: "Other" political affiliations listed as follows: Independent Democrats – 4,440; Christian Party of Florida – 1,354; Veterans' Party of Florida – 1,129; Socialist Party of Florida – 553; Surfers' Party – 169; America First Party – 527; Family Values Party – 484; Socialist Workers Party – 311; Faith and Patience – 209; American Reform Party – 345; American Libertarian Party – 105; Progressive Libertarian Party – 85; Possibility Party – 24; Prohibition Party – 39; Moderate Party of Florida – 80; Poor Peoples' Party – 75; British Reformed Sectarian Party – 33)	1,964,123	10,433,849
2004	3,892,492	4,261,249	212,750	13,806	585	6,646	3,872	16,838	7,039 (Note: "Other" political affiliations listed as follows: Veterans' Party of Florida – 1,502; Independent Democrats – 1,246; Christian Party of Florida – 1,034; No Partisan Affiliation Party – 717; Southern Party of Florida – 484; Family Values Party – 411; American Reform Party – 384; Socialist Party of Florida – 363; America First Party – 305; Socialist Workers Party – 266; Faith and Patience – 132; Citizens' Party of Florida – 94; Progressive Libertarian Party – 39; Patriot Party of Florida – 22; United Independents of God – 21; British Reformed Sectarian Party – 16; Surfers' Party – 3)	1,886,013	10,301,290
2002	3,599,053	3,958,910	179,711	11,852	336	5,590	4,616	5,018	3,107 (Note: "Other" political affiliations listed as follows: We The People Party – 502; Southern Party of Florida – 444; American Reform Party – 431; Family Values Party – 343; Natural Law Party – 310; Socialist Party of Florida – 264; Reform–Silly Party – 240; Socialist Workers Party – 201; Workers World – 51; America First Party – 24; Reform Party USA – 14; Faith and Patience – 11; No Partisan Affiliation Party – 6; Progressive Libertarian Party – 0)	1,534,433	9,302,360
2000	3,420,238	3,803,081	146,559	9,462	94	2,728	4,672	–	2,452 (Note: "Other" political affiliations listed as follows: Natural Law Party – 669; Conservative Party of Florida – 486; American Reform Party – 357; Reform–Silly Party – 168; Socialist Party of Florida – 167; Southern Party of Florida – 165; Socialist Workers Party – 156; Family Values Party – 151; We The People Party – 77; Christian Party of Florida – 40; Workers World – 16)	1,353,431	8,742,717
1998	3,292,589	3,691,742	113,361	7,037	–	965	2,695	–	1,910 (Note: "Other" political affiliations listed as follows: Conservative Party of Florida – 1,356; Natural Law Party – 207; Socialist Workers Party – 117; Socialist Party of Florida – 87; American Reform Party – 57; Reform–Silly Party – 54; Family Values Party – 16; We The People Party – 16)	1,109,960	8,220,259
1996	3,309,105	3,728,513	101,138	5,509	79	731	1,557	1,148	1,605 (Note: "Other" political affiliations listed as follows: Conservative Party of Florida – 1,159; American Party of Florida – 183; Natural Law Party – 119; Socialist Workers Party – 107; Reform–Silly Party – 37)	928,492	8,077,877
1994	2,747,074	3,245,518	34,403	3,585	35	453	–	474	375 (Note: "Other" political affiliations listed as follows: American Taxpayers' Party – 177; Socialist Workers Party – 72; Populist Party of Florida – 81; Whig Party – 45)	527,681	6,559,598

== Partisan affiliation of elected officials ==
The following tables indicate party affiliation in the U.S. state of Florida for the individual elected offices of:

- Governor
- Lieutenant Governor
- Attorney General
- Chief Financial Officer
- Commissioner of Agriculture

As well as the following historical offices that were elected from 1889 to 2005:

- Secretary of State
- Comptroller
- Treasurer/Insurance Commissioner/Fire Marshal
- Commissioner of Education (called the Superintendent of Public Instruction before 1969)

The table also indicates the historical party composition in the:

- State Senate
- State House of Representatives
- State delegation to the U.S. Senate (individually)
- State delegation to the U.S. House of Representatives

For years in which a presidential election was held, the table indicates which party's nominees received the state's electoral votes. For the Civil War years, the table indicates the state's delegation to the Confederate Congress, in lieu of the U.S. Congress.

=== 1845–1888 ===
Year	Executive offices		State Legislature		United States Congress			Electoral votes
Year	Governor	Lt. Governor	State Senate	State House	U.S. Senator (Class I)	U.S. Senator (Class III)	U.S. House	Electoral votes
1845	William Dunn Moseley (D)	no such office	11D, 6W	30D, 10W, 1?	David Levy Yulee (D)	James Westcott (D)	Edward C. Cabell (W)	
1846	William Dunn Moseley (D)	no such office	11D, 6W	30D, 10W, 1?	David Levy Yulee (D)	James Westcott (D)	William H. Brockenbrough (D) (Note: The election was successfully contested in the U.S. House by the Democrat who initially lost.)	
1847	William Dunn Moseley (D)	no such office	12D, 7W	22D, 17W	David Levy Yulee (D)	James Westcott (D)	Edward C. Cabell (W)	
1848	William Dunn Moseley (D)	no such office	12W, 7D	21W, 11D, 7?	David Levy Yulee (D)	James Westcott (D)	Edward C. Cabell (W)	Zachary Taylor/ Millard Fillmore (W) ✓
1849	Thomas Brown (W)	no such office	12W, 7D	24W, 16D	David Levy Yulee (D)	Jackson Morton (W)	Edward C. Cabell (W)	Zachary Taylor/ Millard Fillmore (W) ✓
1850	Thomas Brown (W)	no such office	12W, 7D	24W, 16D	David Levy Yulee (D)	Jackson Morton (W)	Edward C. Cabell (W)	Zachary Taylor/ Millard Fillmore (W) ✓
1851	Thomas Brown (W)	no such office	10D, 9W	21D, 19W	Stephen Mallory (D)	Jackson Morton (W)	Edward C. Cabell (W)	Zachary Taylor/ Millard Fillmore (W) ✓
1852	Thomas Brown (W)	no such office	10D, 9W	21D, 19W	Stephen Mallory (D)	Jackson Morton (W)	Edward C. Cabell (W)	Franklin Pierce/ William R. King (D) ✓
1853	James E. Broome (D)	no such office	12D, 6W, 1I	26D, 13W, 1 vac.	Stephen Mallory (D)	Jackson Morton (W)	Augustus Maxwell (D)	Franklin Pierce/ William R. King (D) ✓
1854	James E. Broome (D)	no such office	12D, 6W, 1I	26D, 13W, 1 vac.	Stephen Mallory (D)	Jackson Morton (W)	Augustus Maxwell (D)	Franklin Pierce/ William R. King (D) ✓
1855	James E. Broome (D)	no such office	11D, 7W, 1 vac.	23D, 17W, 1?	Stephen Mallory (D)	David Levy Yulee (D)	Augustus Maxwell (D)	Franklin Pierce/ William R. King (D) ✓
1856	James E. Broome (D)	no such office	11D, 7W, 1 vac.	23D, 17W, 1?	Stephen Mallory (D)	David Levy Yulee (D)	Augustus Maxwell (D)	James Buchanan/ John C. Breckinridge (D) ✓
1857	Madison S. Perry (D)	no such office	13D, 7KN, 1?	29D, 16KN	Stephen Mallory (D)	David Levy Yulee (D)	George Sydney Hawkins (D)	James Buchanan/ John C. Breckinridge (D) ✓
1858	Madison S. Perry (D)	no such office	13D, 7KN, 1?	29D, 16KN	Stephen Mallory (D)	David Levy Yulee (D)	George Sydney Hawkins (D)	James Buchanan/ John C. Breckinridge (D) ✓
1859	Madison S. Perry (D)	no such office	15D, 6O	35D, 10O	Stephen Mallory (D)	David Levy Yulee (D)	George Sydney Hawkins (D)	James Buchanan/ John C. Breckinridge (D) ✓
1860	Madison S. Perry (D)	no such office	15D, 6O	35D, 10O	Stephen Mallory (D)	David Levy Yulee (D)	George Sydney Hawkins (D)	John C. Breckinridge/ Joseph Lane (SD) ✗
1861	John Milton (D) (Note: Died in office.)	no such office	13D, 8O	37D, 10O	vacant during Civil War			John C. Breckinridge/ Joseph Lane (SD) ✗
1862	John Milton (D)	no such office	13D, 8O	37D, 10O	James McNair; Baker (Fmr. W/KN) (Note: Served in the Congress of the Confederate States.)	Augustus Maxwell (Fmr. D)	2 Fmr. D	John C. Breckinridge/ Joseph Lane (SD) ✗
1863	John Milton (D)	no such office			James McNair; Baker (Fmr. W/KN)	Augustus Maxwell (Fmr. D)	2 Fmr. D	John C. Breckinridge/ Joseph Lane (SD) ✗
1864	John Milton (D)	no such office			James McNair; Baker (Fmr. W/KN)	Augustus Maxwell (Fmr. D)	2 Fmr. D	Civil War
1865	Abraham K. Allison (D) (Note: As president of state Senate, filled unexpired term.) (Note: Resigned from office to go into hiding from approaching Union troops.)	no such office			James McNair; Baker (Fmr. W/KN)	Augustus Maxwell (Fmr. D)	2 Fmr. D	Civil War
1865	vacant	no such office			vacant during Reconstruction			Civil War
1865	William Marvin (D) (Note: Appointed Provisional Governor by President Andrew Johnson following the Civil War.)	no such office			vacant during Reconstruction			Civil War
1865	vacant	no such office			vacant during Reconstruction			Civil War
1866	David S. Walker (IR) (Note: Most sources state Walker was a Democrat; the state archives say he was "Conservative". He was formerly a Whig, Know Nothing, and Constitutional Unionist, and he ran in the 1868 election as an "Independent Republican.")	William W. J. Kelly (R)	21NP	47NP	William Marvin (D) (Note: Elected in 1865, but his credentials were not accepted by the Congress.)	Wilkinson Call (D)	Frederick McLeod (D)	Civil War
1867	David S. Walker (IR)	William W. J. Kelly (R)	21NP	47NP	vacant during Reconstruction			Civil War
1868	David S. Walker (IR)	William W. J. Kelly (R)	21NP	47NP	vacant during Reconstruction			Civil War
1868	Harrison Reed (R) (Note: Was popularly elected; assumed office on June 8, 1868. It was not until July 4, 1868, however, that the military commander of Florida, still under Reconstruction, recognized the validity of the state constitution and the election.)	William Henry Gleason (R)	16R, 8D	37R, 15D	Adonijah Welch (R)	Thomas W. Osborn (R)	Charles Memorial Hamilton (R)	Ulysses S. Grant/ Schuyler Colfax (R) ✓
1869	Harrison Reed (R)	vacant	16R, 8D	37R, 15D	Abijah Gilbert (R)	Thomas W. Osborn (R)	Charles Memorial Hamilton (R)	Ulysses S. Grant/ Schuyler Colfax (R) ✓
1870	Harrison Reed (R)	Edmund C. Weeks (R)	16R, 8D	37R, 15D	Abijah Gilbert (R)	Thomas W. Osborn (R)	Charles Memorial Hamilton (R)	Ulysses S. Grant/ Schuyler Colfax (R) ✓
1871	Harrison Reed (R)	Samuel T. Day (R)	11R, 10D (Note: The Legislature rejected the returns from three Senate districts; had they been admitted, the Senate would have been tied 12-12.)	23R, 20D (Note: The Legislature rejected the returns from nine House districts; had they been admitted, the House would have had a 28-23 Democratic majority with 1 Independent.)	Abijah Gilbert (R)	Thomas W. Osborn (R)	Josiah T. Walls (R)	Ulysses S. Grant/ Schuyler Colfax (R) ✓
1872	Harrison Reed (R)	Samuel T. Day (R)	11R, 10D	23R, 20D	Abijah Gilbert (R)	Thomas W. Osborn (R)	Silas L. Niblack (D)	Ulysses S. Grant/ Henry Wilson (R) ✓
1873	Ossian B. Hart (R)	Marcellus Stearns (R)	13R, 11D	29R, 23D	Abijah Gilbert (R)	Simon B. Conover (R)	2R	Ulysses S. Grant/ Henry Wilson (R) ✓
1874	Marcellus Sterns (R) (Note: As lieutenant governor, filled unexpired term.)	vacant	13R, 11D	29R, 23D	Abijah Gilbert (R)	Simon B. Conover (R)	2R	Ulysses S. Grant/ Henry Wilson (R) ✓
1875	Marcellus Sterns (R)	vacant	12D, 12R	28D, 24R	Charles W. Jones (D)	Simon B. Conover (R)	2R	Ulysses S. Grant/ Henry Wilson (R) ✓
1876	Marcellus Sterns (R)	vacant	12D, 12R	28D, 24R	Charles W. Jones (D)	Simon B. Conover (R)	1D, 1R (Note: The election for the 2nd District was successfully contested in the U.S. House by the Democrat who initially lost.)	Rutherford B. Hayes/ William A. Wheeler (R) ✓
1877	George Franklin Drew (D)	Noble A. Hull (D)	15D, 9R	31D, 21R	Charles W. Jones (D)	Simon B. Conover (R)	1D, 1R	Rutherford B. Hayes/ William A. Wheeler (R) ✓
1878	George Franklin Drew (D)	Noble A. Hull (D)	15D, 9R	31D, 21R	Charles W. Jones (D)	Simon B. Conover (R)	2D	Rutherford B. Hayes/ William A. Wheeler (R) ✓
1879	George Franklin Drew (D)	Noble A. Hull (D)	25D, 7R	46D, 28R, 1I, 1 tied	Charles W. Jones (D)	Wilkinson Call (D)	2D	Rutherford B. Hayes/ William A. Wheeler (R) ✓
1880	George Franklin Drew (D)	Noble A. Hull (D)	25D, 7R	46D, 28R, 1I, 1 tied	Charles W. Jones (D)	Wilkinson Call (D)	1D, 1R (Note: The election for the 2nd District was successfully contested in the U.S. House by the Republican who initially lost.)	Winfield Scott Hancock/ William Hayden English (D) ✗
1881	William D. Bloxham (D)	Livingston W. Bethel (D)	27D, 5R	58D, 18R	Charles W. Jones (D)	Wilkinson Call (D)	2D	Winfield Scott Hancock/ William Hayden English (D) ✗
1882	William D. Bloxham (D)	Livingston W. Bethel (D)	27D, 5R	58D, 18R	Charles W. Jones (D)	Wilkinson Call (D)	1D, 1R	Winfield Scott Hancock/ William Hayden English (D) ✗
1883	William D. Bloxham (D)	Livingston W. Bethel (D)	17D, 9I, 6R	34D, 27R, 15I (Note: Though not winning enough seats to form an outright majority, the Democrats received enough votes to claim the Speakership and organize the House.)	Charles W. Jones (D)	Wilkinson Call (D)	1D, 1R	Winfield Scott Hancock/ William Hayden English (D) ✗
1884	William D. Bloxham (D)	Livingston W. Bethel (D)	17D, 9I, 6R	34D, 27R, 15I	Charles W. Jones (D)	Wilkinson Call (D)	1D, 1R	Grover Cleveland/ Thomas A. Hendricks (D) ✓
1885	Edward A. Perry (D)	Milton H. Mabry (D)	17D, 8I, 7R	48D, 25R, 3I	Charles W. Jones (D)	Wilkinson Call (D)	2D	Grover Cleveland/ Thomas A. Hendricks (D) ✓
1886	Edward A. Perry (D)	Milton H. Mabry (D)	17D, 8I, 7R	48D, 25R, 3I	Charles W. Jones (D)	Wilkinson Call (D)	2D	Grover Cleveland/ Thomas A. Hendricks (D) ✓
1887	Edward A. Perry (D)	Milton H. Mabry (D)	24D, 5R, 3I	55D, 13R, 8I	Samuel Pasco (D)	Wilkinson Call (D)	2D	Grover Cleveland/ Thomas A. Hendricks (D) ✓
1888	Edward A. Perry (D)	Milton H. Mabry (D)	24D, 5R, 3I	55D, 13R, 8I	Samuel Pasco (D)	Wilkinson Call (D)	2D	Grover Cleveland/ Allen G. Thurman (D) ✗

=== 1889–1960 ===
Year	Executive offices							State Legislature		United States Congress			Electoral votes
Year	Governor	Sec. of State	Attorney General	Comptroller	Treasurer	Comm. of Ed.	Comm. of Ag.	State Senate	State House	U.S. Senator (Class I)	U.S. Senator (Class III)	U.S. House	Electoral votes
1889	Francis P. Fleming (D)	John L. Crawford (D)	William Bailey Lamar (D)	William D. Barnes (D)	Francis J. Pons (D)	Albert J. Russell (D)	Lucius B. Wombwell (D)	27D, 5R	58D, 9R, 9I	Samuel Pasco (D)	Wilkinson Call (D)	2D	Cleveland/ Thurman (D) ✗
1890	Francis P. Fleming (D)	John L. Crawford (D)	William Bailey Lamar (D)	William D. Bloxham (D)	Francis J. Pons (D)	Albert J. Russell (D)	Lucius B. Wombwell (D)	27D, 5R	58D, 9R, 9I	Samuel Pasco (D)	Wilkinson Call (D)	2D	Cleveland/ Thurman (D) ✗
1891	Francis P. Fleming (D)	John L. Crawford (D)	William Bailey Lamar (D)	William D. Bloxham (D)	E. J. Triay (D)	Albert J. Russell (D)	Lucius B. Wombwell (D)	31D, 1R	76D	Samuel Pasco (D)	Wilkinson Call (D)	2D	Cleveland/ Thurman (D) ✗
1892	Francis P. Fleming (D)	John L. Crawford (D)	William Bailey Lamar (D)	William D. Bloxham (D)	E. J. Triay (D)	Albert J. Russell (D)	Lucius B. Wombwell (D)	31D, 1R	76D	Samuel Pasco (D)	Wilkinson Call (D)	2D	Cleveland/ Stevenson (D) ✓
1893	Henry L. Mitchell (D)	John L. Crawford (D)	William Bailey Lamar (D)	William D. Bloxham (D)	Clarence B. Collins (D)	William N. Sheats (D)	Lucius B. Wombwell (D)	31D, 1R	76D	Samuel Pasco (D)	Wilkinson Call (D)	2D	Cleveland/ Stevenson (D) ✓
1894	Henry L. Mitchell (D)	John L. Crawford (D)	William Bailey Lamar (D)	William D. Bloxham (D)	Clarence B. Collins (D)	William N. Sheats (D)	Lucius B. Wombwell (D)	31D, 1R	76D	Samuel Pasco (D)	Wilkinson Call (D)	2D	Cleveland/ Stevenson (D) ✓
1895	Henry L. Mitchell (D)	John L. Crawford (D)	William Bailey Lamar (D)	William D. Bloxham (D)	Clarence B. Collins (D)	William N. Sheats (D)	Lucius B. Wombwell (D)	31D, 1P	74D, 1R, 1I	Samuel Pasco (D)	Wilkinson Call (D)	2D	Cleveland/ Stevenson (D) ✓
1896	Henry L. Mitchell (D)	John L. Crawford (D)	William Bailey Lamar (D)	William D. Bloxham (D)	Clarence B. Collins (D)	William N. Sheats (D)	Lucius B. Wombwell (D)	31D, 1P	74D, 1R, 1I	Samuel Pasco (D)	Wilkinson Call (D)	2D	Bryan/ Sewall (D) ✗
1897	William D. Bloxham (D)	John L. Crawford (D)	William Bailey Lamar (D)	William H. Reynolds (D)	James B. Whitfield (D)	William N. Sheats (D)	Lucius B. Wombwell (D)	31D, 1P	63D, 3R, 2I	Samuel Pasco (D)	Stephen Mallory II (D)	2D	Bryan/ Sewall (D) ✗
1898	William D. Bloxham (D)	John L. Crawford (D)	William Bailey Lamar (D)	William H. Reynolds (D)	James B. Whitfield (D)	William N. Sheats (D)	Lucius B. Wombwell (D)	31D, 1P	63D, 3R, 2I	Samuel Pasco (D)	Stephen Mallory II (D)	2D	Bryan/ Sewall (D) ✗
1899	William D. Bloxham (D)	John L. Crawford (D)	William Bailey Lamar (D)	William H. Reynolds (D)	James B. Whitfield (D)	William N. Sheats (D)	Lucius B. Wombwell (D)	32D	68D	James Taliaferro (D)	Stephen Mallory II (D)	2D	Bryan/ Sewall (D) ✗
1900	William D. Bloxham (D)	John L. Crawford (D)	William Bailey Lamar (D)	William H. Reynolds (D)	James B. Whitfield (D)	William N. Sheats (D)	Lucius B. Wombwell (D)	32D	68D	James Taliaferro (D)	Stephen Mallory II (D)	2D	Bryan/ Stevenson (D) ✗
1901	William Sherman Jennings (D)	John L. Crawford (D)	William Bailey Lamar (D)	A. C. Croom (D)	James B. Whitfield (D)	William N. Sheats (D)	Benjamin E. McLin (D)	32D	68D	James Taliaferro (D)	Stephen Mallory II (D)	2D	Bryan/ Stevenson (D) ✗
1902	William Sherman Jennings (D)	Henry Clay Crawford (D) (Note: Initially appointed to fill vacancy; later elected in his own right.)	William Bailey Lamar (D)	A. C. Croom (D)	James B. Whitfield (D)	William N. Sheats (D)	Benjamin E. McLin (D)	32D	68D	James Taliaferro (D)	Stephen Mallory II (D)	2D	Bryan/ Stevenson (D) ✗
1903	William Sherman Jennings (D)	Henry Clay Crawford (D)	James B. Whitfield (D)	A. C. Croom (D)	William V. Knott (D)	William N. Sheats (D)	Benjamin E. McLin (D)	32D	67D, 1R	James Taliaferro (D)	Stephen Mallory II (D)	3D	Bryan/ Stevenson (D) ✗
1904	William Sherman Jennings (D)	Henry Clay Crawford (D)	W. H. Ellis (D)	A. C. Croom (D)	William V. Knott (D)	William N. Sheats (D)	Benjamin E. McLin (D)	32D	67D, 1R	James Taliaferro (D)	Stephen Mallory II (D)	3D	Parker/ Davis (D) ✗
1905	Napoleon B. Broward (D)	Henry Clay Crawford (D)	W. H. Ellis (D)	A. C. Croom (D)	William V. Knott (D)	William N. Holloway (D)	Benjamin E. McLin (D)	32D	68D	James Taliaferro (D)	Stephen Mallory II (D)	3D	Parker/ Davis (D) ✗
1906	Napoleon B. Broward (D)	Henry Clay Crawford (D)	W. H. Ellis (D)	A. C. Croom (D)	William V. Knott (D)	William N. Holloway (D)	Benjamin E. McLin (D)	32D	68D	James Taliaferro (D)	Stephen Mallory II (D)	3D	Parker/ Davis (D) ✗
1907	Napoleon B. Broward (D)	Henry Clay Crawford (D)	W. H. Ellis (D)	A. C. Croom (D)	William V. Knott (D)	William N. Holloway (D)	Benjamin E. McLin (D)	32D	67D, 1Soc	James Taliaferro (D)	William James Bryan (D)	3D	Parker/ Davis (D) ✗
1908	Napoleon B. Broward (D)	Henry Clay Crawford (D)	W. H. Ellis (D)	A. C. Croom (D)	William V. Knott (D)	William N. Holloway (D)	Benjamin E. McLin (D)	32D	67D, 1Soc	James Taliaferro (D)	William Hall Milton (D)	3D	Bryan/ Kern (D) ✗
1909	Albert W. Gilchrist (D)	Henry Clay Crawford (D)	Park Trammell (D)	A. C. Croom (D)	William V. Knott (D)	William N. Holloway (D)	Benjamin E. McLin (D)	32D	67D, 1Soc	James Taliaferro (D)	Duncan U. Fletcher (D)	3D	Bryan/ Kern (D) ✗
1910	Albert W. Gilchrist (D)	Henry Clay Crawford (D)	Park Trammell (D)	A. C. Croom (D)	William V. Knott (D)	William N. Holloway (D)	Benjamin E. McLin (D)	32D	67D, 1Soc	James Taliaferro (D)	Duncan U. Fletcher (D)	3D	Bryan/ Kern (D) ✗
1911	Albert W. Gilchrist (D)	Henry Clay Crawford (D)	Park Trammell (D)	A. C. Croom (D)	William V. Knott (D)	William N. Holloway (D)	Benjamin E. McLin (D)	32D	68D	Nathan P. Bryan (D)	Duncan U. Fletcher (D)	3D	Bryan/ Kern (D) ✗
1912	Albert W. Gilchrist (D)	Henry Clay Crawford (D)	Park Trammell (D)	William V. Knott (D)	J. C. Luning (D)	William N. Holloway (D)	J. C. Luning (D)	32D	68D	Nathan P. Bryan (D)	Duncan U. Fletcher (D)	3D	Wilson/ Marshall (D) ✓
1913	Park Trammell (D)	Henry Clay Crawford (D)	Thomas F. West (D)	William V. Knott (D)	J. C. Luning (D)	William N. Sheats (D)	William Allen McRae (D)	32D	71D	Nathan P. Bryan (D)	Duncan U. Fletcher (D)	4D	Wilson/ Marshall (D) ✓
1914	Park Trammell (D)	Henry Clay Crawford (D)	Thomas F. West (D)	William V. Knott (D)	J. C. Luning (D)	William N. Sheats (D)	William Allen McRae (D)	32D	71D	Nathan P. Bryan (D)	Duncan U. Fletcher (D)	4D	Wilson/ Marshall (D) ✓
1915	Park Trammell (D)	Henry Clay Crawford (D)	Thomas F. West (D)	William V. Knott (D)	J. C. Luning (D)	William N. Sheats (D)	William Allen McRae (D)	32D	73D	Nathan P. Bryan (D)	Duncan U. Fletcher (D)	4D	Wilson/ Marshall (D) ✓
1916	Park Trammell (D)	Henry Clay Crawford (D)	Thomas F. West (D)	William V. Knott (D)	J. C. Luning (D)	William N. Sheats (D)	William Allen McRae (D)	32D	73D	Nathan P. Bryan (D)	Duncan U. Fletcher (D)	4D	Wilson/ Marshall (D) ✓
1917	Sidney Johnston Catts (Proh)	Henry Clay Crawford (D)	Van C. Swearingen (D)	Ernest Amos (D)	J. C. Luning (D)	William N. Sheats (D)	William Allen McRae (D)	32D	74D, 1R	Park Trammell (D)	Duncan U. Fletcher (D)	4D	Wilson/ Marshall (D) ✓
1918	Sidney Johnston Catts (Proh)	Henry Clay Crawford (D)	Van C. Swearingen (D)	Ernest Amos (D)	J. C. Luning (D)	William N. Sheats (D)	William Allen McRae (D)	32D	74D, 1R	Park Trammell (D)	Duncan U. Fletcher (D)	4D	Wilson/ Marshall (D) ✓
1919	Sidney Johnston Catts (Proh)	Henry Clay Crawford (D)	Van C. Swearingen (D)	Ernest Amos (D)	J. C. Luning (D)	William N. Sheats (D)	William Allen McRae (D)	32D	77D	Park Trammell (D)	Duncan U. Fletcher (D)	4D	Wilson/ Marshall (D) ✓
1920	Sidney Johnston Catts (Proh)	Henry Clay Crawford (D)	Van C. Swearingen (D)	Ernest Amos (D)	J. C. Luning (D)	William N. Sheats (D)	William Allen McRae (D)	32D	77D	Park Trammell (D)	Duncan U. Fletcher (D)	4D	Cox/ Roosevelt (D) ✗
1921	Cary A. Hardee (D)	Henry Clay Crawford (D)	Rivers H. Buford (D)	Ernest Amos (D)	J. C. Luning (D)	William N. Sheats (D)	William Allen McRae (D)	32D	77D	Park Trammell (D)	Duncan U. Fletcher (D)	4D	Cox/ Roosevelt (D) ✗
1922	Cary A. Hardee (D)	Henry Clay Crawford (D)	Rivers H. Buford (D)	Ernest Amos (D)	J. C. Luning (D)	William S. Cawthon (D)	William Allen McRae (D)	32D	77D	Park Trammell (D)	Duncan U. Fletcher (D)	4D	Cox/ Roosevelt (D) ✗
1923	Cary A. Hardee (D)	Henry Clay Crawford (D)	Rivers H. Buford (D)	Ernest Amos (D)	J. C. Luning (D)	William S. Cawthon (D)	Nathan Mayo (D)	32D	77D	Park Trammell (D)	Duncan U. Fletcher (D)	4D	Cox/ Roosevelt (D) ✗
1924	Cary A. Hardee (D)	Henry Clay Crawford (D)	Rivers H. Buford (D)	Ernest Amos (D)	J. C. Luning (D)	William S. Cawthon (D)	Nathan Mayo (D)	32D	77D	Park Trammell (D)	Duncan U. Fletcher (D)	4D	Davis/ Bryan (D) ✗
1925	John W. Martin (D)	Henry Clay Crawford (D)	J. B. Johnson (D)	Ernest Amos (D)	J. C. Luning (D)	William S. Cawthon (D)	Nathan Mayo (D)	32D	84D	Park Trammell (D)	Duncan U. Fletcher (D)	4D	Davis/ Bryan (D) ✗
1926	John W. Martin (D)	Henry Clay Crawford (D)	J. B. Johnson (D)	Ernest Amos (D)	J. C. Luning (D)	William S. Cawthon (D)	Nathan Mayo (D)	32D	87D (Note: Three counties were added to the state in 1925 after the Legislature started, adding three seats to the House mid-term.)	Park Trammell (D)	Duncan U. Fletcher (D)	4D	Davis/ Bryan (D) ✗
1927	John W. Martin (D)	Henry Clay Crawford (D)	Fred Henry Davis (D)	Ernest Amos (D)	J. C. Luning (D)	William S. Cawthon (D)	Nathan Mayo (D)	32D	95D	Park Trammell (D)	Duncan U. Fletcher (D)	4D	Davis/ Bryan (D) ✗
1928	John W. Martin (D)	Henry Clay Crawford (D)	Fred Henry Davis (D)	Ernest Amos (D)	William V. Knott (D)	William S. Cawthon (D)	Nathan Mayo (D)	32D	95D	Park Trammell (D)	Duncan U. Fletcher (D)	4D	Hoover/ Curtis (R) ✓
1929	Doyle E. Carlton (D)	William Monroe Igou (D)	Fred Henry Davis (D)	Ernest Amos (D)	William V. Knott (D)	William S. Cawthon (D)	Nathan Mayo (D)	37D, 1R	93D, 2R	Park Trammell (D)	Duncan U. Fletcher (D)	4D	Hoover/ Curtis (R) ✓
1930	Doyle E. Carlton (D)	Robert Andrew Gray (D)	Fred Henry Davis (D)	Ernest Amos (D)	William V. Knott (D)	William S. Cawthon (D)	Nathan Mayo (D)	37D, 1R	93D, 2R	Park Trammell (D)	Duncan U. Fletcher (D)	4D	Hoover/ Curtis (R) ✓
1931	Doyle E. Carlton (D)	Robert Andrew Gray (D)	Cary D. Landis (D)	Ernest Amos (D)	William V. Knott (D)	William S. Cawthon (D)	Nathan Mayo (D)	38D	95D	Park Trammell (D)	Duncan U. Fletcher (D)	4D	Hoover/ Curtis (R) ✓
1932	Doyle E. Carlton (D)	Robert Andrew Gray (D)	Cary D. Landis (D)	Ernest Amos (D)	William V. Knott (D)	William S. Cawthon (D)	Nathan Mayo (D)	38D	95D	Park Trammell (D)	Duncan U. Fletcher (D)	4D	Roosevelt/ Garner (D) ✓
1933	David Sholtz (D)	Robert Andrew Gray (D)	Cary D. Landis (D)	James Martin Lee (D)	William V. Knott (D)	William S. Cawthon (D)	Nathan Mayo (D)	38D	94D, 1R	Park Trammell (D)	Duncan U. Fletcher (D)	5D	Roosevelt/ Garner (D) ✓
1934	David Sholtz (D)	Robert Andrew Gray (D)	Cary D. Landis (D)	James Martin Lee (D)	William V. Knott (D)	William S. Cawthon (D)	Nathan Mayo (D)	38D	94D, 1R	Park Trammell (D)	Duncan U. Fletcher (D)	5D	Roosevelt/ Garner (D) ✓
1935	David Sholtz (D)	Robert Andrew Gray (D)	Cary D. Landis (D)	James Martin Lee (D)	William V. Knott (D)	William S. Cawthon (D)	Nathan Mayo (D)	38D	95D	Park Trammell (D)	Duncan U. Fletcher (D)	5D	Roosevelt/ Garner (D) ✓
1936	David Sholtz (D)	Robert Andrew Gray (D)	Cary D. Landis (D)	James Martin Lee (D)	William V. Knott (D)	William S. Cawthon (D)	Nathan Mayo (D)	38D	95D	Scott Loftin (D)	William Luther Hill (D)	5D	Roosevelt/ Garner (D) ✓
1937	Fred P. Cone (D)	Robert Andrew Gray (D)	Cary D. Landis (D)	James Martin Lee (D)	William V. Knott (D)	Colin English (D)	Nathan Mayo (D)	38D	95D	Charles O. Andrews (D)	Claude Pepper (D)	5D	Roosevelt/ Garner (D) ✓
1938	Fred P. Cone (D)	Robert Andrew Gray (D)	George Couper Gibbs (D)	James Martin Lee (D)	William V. Knott (D)	Colin English (D)	Nathan Mayo (D)	38D	95D	Charles O. Andrews (D)	Claude Pepper (D)	5D	Roosevelt/ Garner (D) ✓
1939	Fred P. Cone (D)	Robert Andrew Gray (D)	George Couper Gibbs (D)	James Martin Lee (D)	William V. Knott (D)	Colin English (D)	Nathan Mayo (D)	38D	95D	Charles O. Andrews (D)	Claude Pepper (D)	5D	Roosevelt/ Garner (D) ✓
1940	Fred P. Cone (D)	Robert Andrew Gray (D)	George Couper Gibbs (D)	James Martin Lee (D)	William V. Knott (D)	Colin English (D)	Nathan Mayo (D)	38D	95D	Charles O. Andrews (D)	Claude Pepper (D)	5D	Roosevelt/ Wallace (D) ✓
1941	Spessard Holland (D)	Robert Andrew Gray (D)	J. Thomas Watson (D)	James Martin Lee (D)	J. Edwin Larson (D)	Colin English (D)	Nathan Mayo (D)	38D	95D	Charles O. Andrews (D)	Claude Pepper (D)	5D	Roosevelt/ Wallace (D) ✓
1942	Spessard Holland (D)	Robert Andrew Gray (D)	J. Thomas Watson (D)	James Martin Lee (D)	J. Edwin Larson (D)	Colin English (D)	Nathan Mayo (D)	38D	95D	Charles O. Andrews (D)	Claude Pepper (D)	5D	Roosevelt/ Wallace (D) ✓
1943	Spessard Holland (D)	Robert Andrew Gray (D)	J. Thomas Watson (D)	James Martin Lee (D)	J. Edwin Larson (D)	Colin English (D)	Nathan Mayo (D)	38D	95D	Charles O. Andrews (D)	Claude Pepper (D)	6D	Roosevelt/ Wallace (D) ✓
1944	Spessard Holland (D)	Robert Andrew Gray (D)	J. Thomas Watson (D)	James Martin Lee (D)	J. Edwin Larson (D)	Colin English (D)	Nathan Mayo (D)	38D	95D	Charles O. Andrews (D)	Claude Pepper (D)	6D	Roosevelt/ Truman (D) ✓
1945	Millard Caldwell (D)	Robert Andrew Gray (D)	J. Thomas Watson (D)	James Martin Lee (D)	J. Edwin Larson (D)	Colin English (D)	Nathan Mayo (D)	38D	95D	Charles O. Andrews (D)	Claude Pepper (D)	6D	Roosevelt/ Truman (D) ✓
1946	Millard Caldwell (D)	Robert Andrew Gray (D)	J. Thomas Watson (D)	Clarence M. Gay (D)	J. Edwin Larson (D)	Colin English (D)	Nathan Mayo (D)	38D	95D	Spessard Holland (D)	Claude Pepper (D)	6D	Roosevelt/ Truman (D) ✓
1947	Millard Caldwell (D)	Robert Andrew Gray (D)	J. Thomas Watson (D)	Clarence M. Gay (D)	J. Edwin Larson (D)	Colin English (D)	Nathan Mayo (D)	38D	94D, 1R	Spessard Holland (D)	Claude Pepper (D)	6D	Roosevelt/ Truman (D) ✓
1948	Millard Caldwell (D)	Robert Andrew Gray (D)	J. Thomas Watson (D)	Clarence M. Gay (D)	J. Edwin Larson (D)	Colin English (D)	Nathan Mayo (D)	38D	94D, 1R	Spessard Holland (D)	Claude Pepper (D)	6D	Truman/ Barkley (D) ✓
1949	Fuller Warren (D)	Robert Andrew Gray (D)	Richard Ervin (D)	Clarence M. Gay (D)	J. Edwin Larson (D)	Thomas D. Bailey (D)	Nathan Mayo (D)	38D	95D	Spessard Holland (D)	Claude Pepper (D)	6D	Truman/ Barkley (D) ✓
1950	Fuller Warren (D)	Robert Andrew Gray (D)	Richard Ervin (D)	Clarence M. Gay (D)	J. Edwin Larson (D)	Thomas D. Bailey (D)	Nathan Mayo (D)	38D	95D	Spessard Holland (D)	Claude Pepper (D)	6D	Truman/ Barkley (D) ✓
1951	Fuller Warren (D)	Robert Andrew Gray (D)	Richard Ervin (D)	Clarence M. Gay (D)	J. Edwin Larson (D)	Thomas D. Bailey (D)	Nathan Mayo (D)	38D	92D, 3R	Spessard Holland (D)	George Smathers (D)	6D	Truman/ Barkley (D) ✓
1952	Fuller Warren (D)	Robert Andrew Gray (D)	Richard Ervin (D)	Clarence M. Gay (D)	J. Edwin Larson (D)	Thomas D. Bailey (D)	Nathan Mayo (D)	38D	92D, 3R	Spessard Holland (D)	George Smathers (D)	6D	Eisenhower/ Nixon (R) ✓
1953	Daniel T. McCarty (D)	Robert Andrew Gray (D)	Richard Ervin (D)	Clarence M. Gay (D)	J. Edwin Larson (D)	Thomas D. Bailey (D)	Nathan Mayo (D)	37D, 1R	90D, 5R	Spessard Holland (D)	George Smathers (D)	8D	Eisenhower/ Nixon (R) ✓
1953	Charley Eugene Johns (D)	Robert Andrew Gray (D)	Richard Ervin (D)	Clarence M. Gay (D)	J. Edwin Larson (D)	Thomas D. Bailey (D)	Nathan Mayo (D)	37D, 1R	90D, 5R	Spessard Holland (D)	George Smathers (D)	8D	Eisenhower/ Nixon (R) ✓
1954	Charley Eugene Johns (D)	Robert Andrew Gray (D)	Richard Ervin (D)	Clarence M. Gay (D)	J. Edwin Larson (D)	Thomas D. Bailey (D)	Nathan Mayo (D)	37D, 1R	90D, 5R	Spessard Holland (D)	George Smathers (D)	8D	Eisenhower/ Nixon (R) ✓
1955	LeRoy Collins (D)	Robert Andrew Gray (D)	Richard Ervin (D)	Ray E. Green (D)	J. Edwin Larson (D)	Thomas D. Bailey (D)	Nathan Mayo (D)	37D, 1R	89D, 6R	Spessard Holland (D)	George Smathers (D)	7D, 1R	Eisenhower/ Nixon (R) ✓
1956	LeRoy Collins (D)	Robert Andrew Gray (D)	Richard Ervin (D)	Ray E. Green (D)	J. Edwin Larson (D)	Thomas D. Bailey (D)	Nathan Mayo (D)	37D, 1R	89D, 6R	Spessard Holland (D)	George Smathers (D)	7D, 1R	Eisenhower/ Nixon (R) ✓
1957	LeRoy Collins (D)	Robert Andrew Gray (D)	Richard Ervin (D)	Ray E. Green (D)	J. Edwin Larson (D)	Thomas D. Bailey (D)	Nathan Mayo (D)	37D, 1R	89D, 6R	Spessard Holland (D)	George Smathers (D)	7D, 1R	Eisenhower/ Nixon (R) ✓
1958	LeRoy Collins (D)	Robert Andrew Gray (D)	Richard Ervin (D)	Ray E. Green (D)	J. Edwin Larson (D)	Thomas D. Bailey (D)	Nathan Mayo (D)	37D, 1R	89D, 6R	Spessard Holland (D)	George Smathers (D)	7D, 1R	Eisenhower/ Nixon (R) ✓
1959	LeRoy Collins (D)	Robert Andrew Gray (D)	Richard Ervin (D)	Ray E. Green (D)	J. Edwin Larson (D)	Thomas D. Bailey (D)	Nathan Mayo (D)	37D, 1R	92D, 3R	Spessard Holland (D)	George Smathers (D)	7D, 1R	Eisenhower/ Nixon (R) ✓
1960	LeRoy Collins (D)	Robert Andrew Gray (D)	Richard Ervin (D)	Ray E. Green (D)	J. Edwin Larson (D)	Thomas D. Bailey (D)	Lee Thompson (D)	37D, 1R	92D, 3R	Spessard Holland (D)	George Smathers (D)	7D, 1R	Nixon/ Lodge (R) ✗

=== 1961–2002 ===
Year	Executive offices								State Legislature		United States Congress			Electoral votes
Year	Governor	Lt. Governor	Sec. of State	Attorney General	Comptroller	Treasurer	Comm. of Ed.	Comm. of Ag.	State Senate	State House	U.S. Senator (Class I)	U.S. Senator (Class III)	U.S. House	Electoral votes
1961	C. Farris Bryant (D)	no such office	Thomas Burton; Adams Jr. (D)	Richard Ervin (D) (Note: Resigned in order to accept appointment to the Florida Supreme Court.)	Ray E. Green (D)	J. Edwin Larson (D)	Thomas D. Bailey (D)	Doyle Conner (D)	37D, 1R	88D, 7R	Spessard Holland (D)	George Smathers (D)	7D, 1R	Nixon/ Lodge (R) ✗
1962	C. Farris Bryant (D)	no such office	Thomas Burton; Adams Jr. (D)	Richard Ervin (D)	Ray E. Green (D)	J. Edwin Larson (D)	Thomas D. Bailey (D)	Doyle Conner (D)	37D, 1R	88D, 7R	Spessard Holland (D)	George Smathers (D)	7D, 1R	Nixon/ Lodge (R) ✗
1963	C. Farris Bryant (D)	no such office	Thomas Burton; Adams Jr. (D)	Richard Ervin (D)	Ray E. Green (D)	J. Edwin Larson (D)	Thomas D. Bailey (D)	Doyle Conner (D)	41D, 2R (Note: Due to the effects of Baker vs. Carr, the 1962 midterms were thrown out by a court, and a redistricting was conducted with new elections thereafter. The original results for the Senate yielded a 37-1 Democratic majority, and the original results for the House yielded a 90-5 Democratic majority.)	109D, 16R	Spessard Holland (D)	George Smathers (D)	10D, 2R	Nixon/ Lodge (R) ✗
1964	C. Farris Bryant (D)	no such office	Thomas Burton; Adams Jr. (D)	James W. Kynes (D) (Note: Appointed by governor to fill vacancy.)	Ray E. Green (D)	J. Edwin Larson (D)	Thomas D. Bailey (D)	Doyle Conner (D)	41D, 2R	109D, 16R	Spessard Holland (D)	George Smathers (D)	10D, 2R	Johnson/ Humphrey (D) ✓
1965	W. Haydon Burns (D)	no such office	Thomas Burton; Adams Jr. (D)	Earl Faircloth (D)	Fred O. Dickinson (D)	Broward Williams (D)	Floyd T. Christian (D)	Doyle Conner (D)	41D, 2R	102D, 10R	Spessard Holland (D)	George Smathers (D)	10D, 2R	Johnson/ Humphrey (D) ✓
1966	W. Haydon Burns (D)	no such office	Thomas Burton; Adams Jr. (D)	Earl Faircloth (D)	Fred O. Dickinson (D)	Broward Williams (D)	Floyd T. Christian (D)	Doyle Conner (D)	41D, 2R	102D, 10R	Spessard Holland (D)	George Smathers (D)	10D, 2R	Johnson/ Humphrey (D) ✓
1967	Claude R. Kirk Jr. (R)	no such office	Thomas Burton; Adams Jr. (D)	Earl Faircloth (D)	Fred O. Dickinson (D)	Broward Williams (D)	Floyd T. Christian (D)	Doyle Conner (D)	28D, 20R (Note: Due to additional efforts to satisfy "one man, one vote"-style redistricting failing, the 1966 midterms were thrown out by a court, and a redistricting by the judiciary was conducted with new elections thereafter. The original results for the Senate yielded a 37-11 Democratic majority, and the original results for the House yielded a 91-26 Democratic majority.)	80D, 39R	Spessard Holland (D)	George Smathers (D)	9D, 3R	Johnson/ Humphrey (D) ✓
1968	Claude R. Kirk Jr. (R)	no such office	Thomas Burton; Adams Jr. (D)	Earl Faircloth (D)	Fred O. Dickinson (D)	Broward Williams (D)	Floyd T. Christian (D)	Doyle Conner (D)	28D, 20R	80D, 39R	Spessard Holland (D)	George Smathers (D)	9D, 3R	Nixon/ Agnew (R) ✓
1969	Claude R. Kirk Jr. (R)	Ray Osborne (R) (Note: First lieutenant governor under the state constitution of 1968 and the state's first lieutenant governor since 1889. Appointed by Governor Claude R. Kirk Jr.)	Thomas Burton; Adams Jr. (D)	Earl Faircloth (D)	Fred O. Dickinson (D)	Broward Williams (D)	Floyd T. Christian (D)	Doyle Conner (D)	32D, 16R	77D, 42R	Spessard Holland (D)	Edward Gurney (R)	9D, 3R	Nixon/ Agnew (R) ✓
1970	Claude R. Kirk Jr. (R)	Ray Osborne (R)	Thomas Burton; Adams Jr. (D)	Earl Faircloth (D)	Fred O. Dickinson (D)	Broward Williams (D)	Floyd T. Christian (D)	Doyle Conner (D)	32D, 16R	77D, 42R	Spessard Holland (D)	Edward Gurney (R)	9D, 3R	Nixon/ Agnew (R) ✓
1971	Reubin Askew (D)	Thomas Burton; Adams Jr. (D)	Richard Stone (D)	Robert Shevin (D)	Fred O. Dickinson (D)	Thomas D. O'Malley (D)	Floyd T. Christian (D)	Doyle Conner (D)	33D, 15R	81D, 38R	Lawton Chiles (D)	Edward Gurney (R)	9D, 3R	Nixon/ Agnew (R) ✓
1972	Reubin Askew (D)	Thomas Burton; Adams Jr. (D)	Richard Stone (D)	Robert Shevin (D)	Fred O. Dickinson (D)	Thomas D. O'Malley (D)	Floyd T. Christian (D)	Doyle Conner (D)	33D, 15R	81D, 38R	Lawton Chiles (D)	Edward Gurney (R)	9D, 3R	Nixon/ Agnew (R) ✓
1973	Reubin Askew (D)	Thomas Burton; Adams Jr. (D)	Richard Stone (D)	Robert Shevin (D)	Fred O. Dickinson (D)	Thomas D. O'Malley (D)	Floyd T. Christian (D)	Doyle Conner (D)	25D, 14R, 1I	77D, 43R	Lawton Chiles (D)	Edward Gurney (R)	11D, 4R	Nixon/ Agnew (R) ✓
1974	Reubin Askew (D)	Thomas Burton; Adams Jr. (D)	Dorothy Glisson (D)	Robert Shevin (D)	Fred O. Dickinson (D)	Thomas D. O'Malley (D)	Floyd T. Christian (D)	Doyle Conner (D)	25D, 14R, 1I	77D, 43R	Lawton Chiles (D)	Edward Gurney (R)	11D, 4R	Nixon/ Agnew (R) ✓
1975	Reubin Askew (D)	Jim Williams (D)	Bruce Smathers (D) (Note: Resigned in order to run for governor.)	Robert Shevin (D)	Gerald Lewis (D)	Phil Ashler (D)	Ralph Turlington (D)	Doyle Conner (D)	27D, 12R, 1I	86D, 34R	Lawton Chiles (D)	Richard Stone (D)	10D, 5R	Nixon/ Agnew (R) ✓
1976	Reubin Askew (D)	Jim Williams (D)	Bruce Smathers (D)	Robert Shevin (D)	Gerald Lewis (D)	Bill Gunter (D)	Ralph Turlington (D)	Doyle Conner (D)	27D, 12R, 1I	86D, 34R	Lawton Chiles (D)	Richard Stone (D)	10D, 5R	Carter/ Mondale (D) ✓
1977	Reubin Askew (D)	Jim Williams (D)	Bruce Smathers (D)	Robert Shevin (D)	Gerald Lewis (D)	Bill Gunter (D)	Ralph Turlington (D)	Doyle Conner (D)	30D, 9R, 1I	92D, 28R	Lawton Chiles (D)	Richard Stone (D)	10D, 5R	Carter/ Mondale (D) ✓
1978	Reubin Askew (D)	Jim Williams (D)	Jesse J. McCrary Jr. (D)	Robert Shevin (D)	Gerald Lewis (D)	Bill Gunter (D)	Ralph Turlington (D)	Doyle Conner (D)	30D, 9R, 1I	92D, 28R	Lawton Chiles (D)	Richard Stone (D)	10D, 5R	Carter/ Mondale (D) ✓
1979	Bob Graham (D) (Note: Resigned to take elected seat in the United States Senate.)	Wayne Mixson (D)	George Firestone (D)	James C. Smith (D)	Gerald Lewis (D)	Bill Gunter (D)	Ralph Turlington (D)	Doyle Conner (D)	29D, 11R	89D, 31R	Lawton Chiles (D)	Richard Stone (D)	12D, 3R	Carter/ Mondale (D) ✓
1980	Bob Graham (D)	Wayne Mixson (D)	George Firestone (D)	James C. Smith (D)	Gerald Lewis (D)	Bill Gunter (D)	Ralph Turlington (D)	Doyle Conner (D)	29D, 11R	89D, 31R	Lawton Chiles (D)	Richard Stone (D)	12D, 3R	Reagan/ Bush (R) ✓
1981	Bob Graham (D)	Wayne Mixson (D)	George Firestone (D)	James C. Smith (D)	Gerald Lewis (D)	Bill Gunter (D)	Ralph Turlington (D)	Doyle Conner (D)	27D, 13R	81D, 39R	Lawton Chiles (D)	Paula Hawkins (R)	11D, 4R	Reagan/ Bush (R) ✓
1982	Bob Graham (D)	Wayne Mixson (D)	George Firestone (D)	James C. Smith (D)	Gerald Lewis (D)	Bill Gunter (D)	Ralph Turlington (D)	Doyle Conner (D)	27D, 13R	81D, 39R	Lawton Chiles (D)	Paula Hawkins (R)	11D, 4R	Reagan/ Bush (R) ✓
1983	Bob Graham (D)	Wayne Mixson (D)	George Firestone (D)	James C. Smith (D)	Gerald Lewis (D)	Bill Gunter (D)	Ralph Turlington (D)	Doyle Conner (D)	32D, 8R	84D, 36R	Lawton Chiles (D)	Paula Hawkins (R)	13D, 6R	Reagan/ Bush (R) ✓
1984	Bob Graham (D)	Wayne Mixson (D)	George Firestone (D)	James C. Smith (D)	Gerald Lewis (D)	Bill Gunter (D)	Ralph Turlington (D)	Doyle Conner (D)	32D, 8R	84D, 36R	Lawton Chiles (D)	Paula Hawkins (R)	13D, 6R	Reagan/ Bush (R) ✓
1985	Bob Graham (D)	Wayne Mixson (D)	George Firestone (D)	James C. Smith (D)	Gerald Lewis (D)	Bill Gunter (D)	Ralph Turlington (D)	Doyle Conner (D)	31D, 9R	77D, 43R	Lawton Chiles (D)	Paula Hawkins (R)	12D, 7R	Reagan/ Bush (R) ✓
1986	Bob Graham (D)	Wayne Mixson (D)	George Firestone (D)	James C. Smith (D)	Gerald Lewis (D)	Bill Gunter (D)	Ralph Turlington (D)	Doyle Conner (D)	30D, 10R (Note: Republican Ander Crenshaw won a special election to a vacant seat, flipping the seat from the Democrats to the Republicans.)	77D, 43R	Lawton Chiles (D)	Paula Hawkins (R)	12D, 7R	Reagan/ Bush (R) ✓
1987	Wayne Mixson (D)	vacant	James C. Smith (R)	Bob Butterworth (D)	Gerald Lewis (D)	Bill Gunter (D)	Betty Castor (D)	Doyle Conner (D)	25D, 15R	73D, 47R	Lawton Chiles (D)	Bob Graham (D)	12D, 7R	Reagan/ Bush (R) ✓
1987	Bob Martinez (R)	Bobby Brantley (R)	James C. Smith (R)	Bob Butterworth (D)	Gerald Lewis (D)	Bill Gunter (D)	Betty Castor (D)	Doyle Conner (D)	25D, 15R	73D, 47R	Lawton Chiles (D)	Bob Graham (D)	12D, 7R	Reagan/ Bush (R) ✓
1988	Bob Martinez (R)	Bobby Brantley (R)	James C. Smith (R)	Bob Butterworth (D)	Gerald Lewis (D)	Bill Gunter (D)	Betty Castor (D)	Doyle Conner (D)	25D, 15R	73D, 47R	Lawton Chiles (D)	Bob Graham (D)	12D, 7R	Bush/ Quayle (R) ✓
1989	Bob Martinez (R)	Bobby Brantley (R)	James C. Smith (R)	Bob Butterworth (D)	Gerald Lewis (D)	Tom Gallagher (R)	Betty Castor (D)	Doyle Conner (D)	23D, 17R	70D, 50R	Connie Mack III (R)	Bob Graham (D)	11R, 8D	Bush/ Quayle (R) ✓
1990	Bob Martinez (R)	Bobby Brantley (R)	James C. Smith (R)	Bob Butterworth (D)	Gerald Lewis (D)	Tom Gallagher (R)	Betty Castor (D)	Doyle Conner (D)	23D, 17R	70D, 50R	Connie Mack III (R)	Bob Graham (D)	11R, 8D	Bush/ Quayle (R) ✓
1991	Lawton Chiles (D)	Buddy MacKay (D)	James C. Smith (R)	Bob Butterworth (D)	Gerald Lewis (D)	Tom Gallagher (R)	Betty Castor (D)	Bob Crawford (D)	23D, 17R	74D, 46R	Connie Mack III (R)	Bob Graham (D)	10R, 9D	Bush/ Quayle (R) ✓
1992	Lawton Chiles (D)	Buddy MacKay (D)	James C. Smith (R)	Bob Butterworth (D)	Gerald Lewis (D)	Tom Gallagher (R)	Betty Castor (D)	Bob Crawford (D)	22D, 18R (Note: One Democrat changed party affiliation to Republican.)	74D, 46R	Connie Mack III (R)	Bob Graham (D)	10R, 9D	Bush/ Quayle (R) ✗
1993	Lawton Chiles (D)	Buddy MacKay (D)	James C. Smith (R)	Bob Butterworth (D)	Gerald Lewis (D)	Tom Gallagher (R)	Betty Castor (D)	Bob Crawford (D)	20D, 20R (Note: Due to the split chamber, the Senate worked out a power-sharing agreement where a Republican served as Senate President in 1993, and a Democrat served in 1994.)	71D, 49R	Connie Mack III (R)	Bob Graham (D)	13R, 10D	Bush/ Quayle (R) ✗
1994	Lawton Chiles (D)	Buddy MacKay (D)	James C. Smith (R)	Bob Butterworth (D)	Gerald Lewis (D)	Tom Gallagher (R)	Doug Jamerson (D)	Bob Crawford (D)	20D, 20R	71D, 49R	Connie Mack III (R)	Bob Graham (D)	13R, 10D	Bush/ Quayle (R) ✗
1995	Lawton Chiles (D)	Buddy MacKay (D)	Sandra Mortham (R)	Bob Butterworth (D)	Bob Milligan (R)	Bill Nelson (D)	Frank Brogan (R)	Bob Crawford (D)	21R, 19D	63D, 57R	Connie Mack III (R)	Bob Graham (D)	15R, 8D	Bush/ Quayle (R) ✗
1996	Lawton Chiles (D)	Buddy MacKay (D)	Sandra Mortham (R)	Bob Butterworth (D)	Bob Milligan (R)	Bill Nelson (D)	Frank Brogan (R)	Bob Crawford (D)	22R, 18D	63D, 57R	Connie Mack III (R)	Bob Graham (D)	15R, 8D	Clinton/ Gore (D) ✓
1997	Lawton Chiles (D)	Buddy MacKay (D)	Sandra Mortham (R)	Bob Butterworth (D)	Bob Milligan (R)	Bill Nelson (D)	Frank Brogan (R)	Bob Crawford (D)	23R, 17D	61R, 59D	Connie Mack III (R)	Bob Graham (D)	15R, 8D	Clinton/ Gore (D) ✓
1998	Lawton Chiles (D)	Buddy MacKay (D)	Sandra Mortham (R)	Bob Butterworth (D)	Bob Milligan (R)	Bill Nelson (D)	Frank Brogan (R)	Bob Crawford (D)	25R, 15D (Note: Republicans gained one seat in a March 1998 special election. One senator changed party affiliation from Democratic to Republican in July 1998.)	66R, 54D (Note: Four members changed party affiliation from Democratic to Republican between May 1997 and April 1998. Republicans gained a seat in an October 1997 special election.)	Connie Mack III (R)	Bob Graham (D)	15R, 8D	Clinton/ Gore (D) ✓
1999	Buddy MacKay (D)	vacant	Katherine Harris (R)	Bob Butterworth (D)	Bob Milligan (R)	Bill Nelson (D)	Tom Gallagher (R)	Bob Crawford (D)	25R, 15D	73R, 47D	Connie Mack III (R)	Bob Graham (D)	15R, 8D	Clinton/ Gore (D) ✓
1999	Jeb Bush (R)	Frank Brogan (R)	Katherine Harris (R)	Bob Butterworth (D)	Bob Milligan (R)	Bill Nelson (D)	Tom Gallagher (R)	Bob Crawford (D)	25R, 15D	73R, 47D	Connie Mack III (R)	Bob Graham (D)	15R, 8D	Clinton/ Gore (D) ✓
2000	Jeb Bush (R)	Frank Brogan (R)	Katherine Harris (R)	Bob Butterworth (D)	Bob Milligan (R)	Bill Nelson (D)	Tom Gallagher (R)	Bob Crawford (D)	25R, 15D	75R, 45D (Note: Democrats gained a seat in a March 1999 special election. Three representatives changed party affiliation from Democratic to Republican between May and December 1999.)	Connie Mack III (R)	Bob Graham (D)	15R, 8D	Bush/ Cheney (R) ✓
2001	Jeb Bush (R)	Frank Brogan (R)	Katherine Harris (R)	Bob Butterworth (D)	Bob Milligan (R)	Tom Gallagher (R)	Charlie Crist (R)	Charles Bronson (R)	25R, 15D	77R, 43D	Bill Nelson (D)	Bob Graham (D)	15R, 8D	Bush/ Cheney (R) ✓
2002	Jeb Bush (R)	Frank Brogan (R)	Katherine Harris (R)	Richard E. Doran (R)	Bob Milligan (R)	Tom Gallagher (R)	Charlie Crist (R)	Charles Bronson (R)	25R, 15D	77R, 43D	Bill Nelson (D)	Bob Graham (D)	15R, 8D	Bush/ Cheney (R) ✓

=== 2003–present ===
Year	Executive offices					State Legislature		United States Congress			Electoral votes
Year	Governor	Lt. Governor	Attorney General	CFO	Commissioner of Agriculture	State Senate	State House	U.S. Senator (Class I)	U.S. Senator (Class III)	U.S. House	Electoral votes
2003	Jeb Bush (R)	Toni Jennings (R)	Charlie Crist (R)	Tom Gallagher (R)	Charles Bronson (R)	26R, 14D	81R, 39D	Bill Nelson (D)	Bob Graham (D)	18R, 7D	Bush/ Cheney (R) ✓
2004	Jeb Bush (R)	Toni Jennings (R)	Charlie Crist (R)	Tom Gallagher (R)	Charles Bronson (R)	26R, 14D	81R, 39D	Bill Nelson (D)	Bob Graham (D)	18R, 7D	Bush/ Cheney (R) ✓
2005	Jeb Bush (R)	Toni Jennings (R)	Charlie Crist (R)	Tom Gallagher (R)	Charles Bronson (R)	26R, 14D	84R, 36D	Bill Nelson (D)	Mel Martínez (R)	18R, 7D	Bush/ Cheney (R) ✓
2006	Jeb Bush (R)	Toni Jennings (R)	Charlie Crist (R)	Tom Gallagher (R)	Charles Bronson (R)	26R, 14D	85R, 35D	Bill Nelson (D)	Mel Martínez (R)	18R, 7D	Bush/ Cheney (R) ✓
2007	Charlie Crist (R)	Jeff Kottkamp (R)	Bill McCollum (R)	Alex Sink (D)	Charles Bronson (R)	26R, 14D	78R, 42D	Bill Nelson (D)	Mel Martínez (R)	16R, 9D	Bush/ Cheney (R) ✓
2008	Charlie Crist (R)	Jeff Kottkamp (R)	Bill McCollum (R)	Alex Sink (D)	Charles Bronson (R)	26R, 14D	77R, 43D (Note: One representative changed party affiliation from Democratic to Republican in November 2006. Democrats gained two seats in special elections in April 2007 and February 2008.)	Bill Nelson (D)	Mel Martínez (R)	16R, 9D	Obama/ Biden (D) ✓
2009	Charlie Crist (R)	Jeff Kottkamp (R)	Bill McCollum (R)	Alex Sink (D)	Charles Bronson (R)	26R, 14D	76R, 44D	Bill Nelson (D)	Mel Martínez (R)	15R, 10D	Obama/ Biden (D) ✓
2010	Charlie Crist (I) (Note: Crist changed his affiliation from Republican to Independent while in office during 2010.)	Jeff Kottkamp (R)	Bill McCollum (R)	Alex Sink (D)	Charles Bronson (R)	26R, 14D	76R, 44D	Bill Nelson (D)	George LeMieux (R)	15R, 10D	Obama/ Biden (D) ✓
2011	Rick Scott (R)	Jennifer Carroll (R)	Pam Bondi (R)	Jeff Atwater (R) (Note: Resigned to take a job in the administration at Florida Atlantic University.)	Adam Putnam (R)	28R, 12D	81R, 39D	Bill Nelson (D)	Marco Rubio (R) (Note: Resigned after being confirmed as United States Secretary of State.)	19R, 6D	Obama/ Biden (D) ✓
2012	Rick Scott (R)	Jennifer Carroll (R)	Pam Bondi (R)	Jeff Atwater (R)	Adam Putnam (R)	28R, 12D	81R, 39D	Bill Nelson (D)	Marco Rubio (R)	19R, 6D	Obama/ Biden (D) ✓
2013	Rick Scott (R)	Vacant	Pam Bondi (R)	Jeff Atwater (R)	Adam Putnam (R)	26R, 14D	76R, 44D	Bill Nelson (D)	Marco Rubio (R)	17R, 10D	Obama/ Biden (D) ✓
2014	Rick Scott (R)	Carlos Lopez-Cantera (R)	Pam Bondi (R)	Jeff Atwater (R)	Adam Putnam (R)	26R, 14D	75R, 45D (Note: Democrats gained a seat in an October 2013 special election.)	Bill Nelson (D)	Marco Rubio (R)	17R, 10D	Obama/ Biden (D) ✓
2015	Rick Scott (R)	Carlos Lopez-Cantera (R)	Pam Bondi (R)	Jeff Atwater (R)	Adam Putnam (R)	26R, 14D	81R, 39D	Bill Nelson (D)	Marco Rubio (R)	17R, 10D	Obama/ Biden (D) ✓
2016	Rick Scott (R)	Carlos Lopez-Cantera (R)	Pam Bondi (R)	Jeff Atwater (R)	Adam Putnam (R)	26R, 14D	81R, 39D	Bill Nelson (D)	Marco Rubio (R)	17R, 10D	Trump/ Pence (R) ✓
2017	Rick Scott (R)	Carlos Lopez-Cantera (R)	Pam Bondi (R)	Jimmy Patronis (R)	Adam Putnam (R)	25R, 15D	79R, 41D	Bill Nelson (D)	Marco Rubio (R)	16R, 11D	Trump/ Pence (R) ✓
2018	Rick Scott (R)	Carlos Lopez-Cantera (R)	Pam Bondi (R)	Jimmy Patronis (R)	Adam Putnam (R)	24R, 16D (Note: Democrats gained a seat in a September 2017 special election.)	78R, 42D (Note: Democrats gained a seat in a February 2018 special election.)	Bill Nelson (D)	Marco Rubio (R)	16R, 11D	Trump/ Pence (R) ✓
2019	Ron DeSantis (R)	Jeanette Nuñez (R) (Note: Resigned February 2025 to become president of the Florida International University.)	Ashley Moody (R)	Jimmy Patronis (R)	Nikki Fried (D)	23R, 17D	73R, 47D	Rick Scott (R)	Marco Rubio (R)	14R, 13D	Trump/ Pence (R) ✓
2020	Ron DeSantis (R)	Jeanette Nuñez (R)	Ashley Moody (R)	Jimmy Patronis (R)	Nikki Fried (D)	23R, 17D	73R, 47D	Rick Scott (R)	Marco Rubio (R)	14R, 13D	Trump/ Pence (R) ✗
2021	Ron DeSantis (R)	Jeanette Nuñez (R)	Ashley Moody (R)	Jimmy Patronis (R)	Nikki Fried (D)	24R, 16D	78R, 42D	Rick Scott (R)	Marco Rubio (R)	16R, 11D	Trump/ Pence (R) ✗
2022	Ron DeSantis (R)	Jeanette Nuñez (R)	Ashley Moody (R)	Jimmy Patronis (R)	Nikki Fried (D)	24R, 16D	78R, 42D	Rick Scott (R)	Marco Rubio (R)	16R, 11D	Trump/ Pence (R) ✗
2023	Ron DeSantis (R)	Jeanette Nuñez (R)	Ashley Moody (R)	Jimmy Patronis (R)	Wilton Simpson (R)	28R, 12D	85R, 35D	Rick Scott (R)	Marco Rubio (R)	20R, 8D	Trump/ Pence (R) ✗
2024	Ron DeSantis (R)	Jeanette Nuñez (R)	Ashley Moody (R)	Jimmy Patronis (R)	Wilton Simpson (R)	28R, 12D	84R, 36D (Note: In district 35, Democrat Tom Keen won a special election on January 16 to replace Republican Fred Hawkins, who had resigned.)	Rick Scott (R)	Marco Rubio (R)	20R, 8D	Trump/ Vance (R) ✓
2025	Ron DeSantis (R)	Jay Collins (R)	James Uthmeier (R)	Blaise Ingoglia (R)	Wilton Simpson (R)	28R, 12D	87R, 33D (Note: Republicans gained one seat in the 2024 elections, and subsequently two Democratic representatives switched parties to Republican.)	Rick Scott (R)	Ashley Moody (R)	20R, 8D	Trump/ Vance (R) ✓
2026	Ron DeSantis (R)	Jay Collins (R)	James Uthmeier (R)	Blaise Ingoglia (R)	Wilton Simpson (R)	28R, 12D	87R, 33D	Rick Scott (R)	Ashley Moody (R)	20R, 7D (Note: Democrat Sheila Cherfilus-McCormick resigned on 21 April 2026.)	Trump/ Vance (R) ✓
2027	Byron Donalds (R)	Bryan Avila (R)	James Uthmeier (R)	Blaise Ingoglia (R)	Wilton Simpson (R)	26R, 13D, 1I	70R, 50D	Rick Scott (R)	Ashley Moody (R)	20R, 8D	Trump/ Vance (R) ✓

== See also ==
- Elections in Florida
- Government of Florida
- Politics of Florida
- Parties:
  - Republican Party of Florida
  - Florida Democratic Party
