= List of political parties in Florida =

This article lists political parties in Florida.

== Major political parties ==
Only political parties with more than 5% of all registered voters may hold state-run primaries.

Party		Ideology	Membership (May 2026)	Membership (2024 GE)	2024 PBA	U.S. Congress	State Senate	State House	Executive Offices
Republican Party	REP	Conservatism	5,533,168 ▲	5,499,717 ▲	Yes	20 / 28	28 / 40	87 / 120	6 / 6
Democratic Party	DEM	Modern liberalism	4,027,949 ▼	4,421,790 ▼	Yes	8 / 28	10 / 40	33 / 120	0 / 6

== Minor political parties ==
Party		Ideology	Membership (May 2026)	Membership (2024 GE)	2024 PBA
Independent Party of Florida	IND	Centrism	315,225 ▲	276,467 ▲	No
Conservative Party of Florida	CSV	Conservatism	41,339 ▲	30,022	No
Libertarian Party	LPF	Libertarianism	34,594 ▼	35,964 ▼	Yes
America First Party of Florida	AMF	America First	19,777 ▲	N/A	No
Constitution Party	CPF	Paleoconservatism	18,383 ▼	19,708 ▲	Yes
Boricua Party	BPP	Puerto Rico Politics	17,311 ▲	9,297 ▲	No
Green Party	GRE	Green politics	9,533 ▲	9,089 ▲	Yes
Coalition with a Purpose	CPP	Inclusive Democracy	8,605 ▲	4,247 ▲	No
American Solidarity Party	ASP	Christian democracy	7,982 ▲	1,966 ▲	Yes
Ecology Party of Florida	ECO	Environmentalism	4,189 ▲	3,264 ▲	No
Party for Socialism and Liberation	PSL	Communism	2,258 ▲	2,172 ▲	Yes
Forward Party	FFP	Reformism	1,909 ▲	735	No
Jeffersonian Party	JEF	Limited Government	106 ▲	N/A	No
MGTOW Party	MGT	Men Going Their Own Way	61 ▲	N/A	No
We the People	WPF	Make America Healthy Again	12 ▲	N/A	No
Defunct parties/Other			90,148	18,372	
Unaffiliated voters			3,438,207 ▼	3,616,170 ▼	

== Formerly recognized political parties ==
Party	Ideology	Lost recognition
Reform Party	Radical centrism	2026
Natural Law Party	Transcendental meditation	2025
People's Party	Populism	2025
No Labels	Centrism	November 2024
Unity Party	Centrism	October 2022
Socialist Party	Socialism	February 2013
Americans Elect		February 2013
Pirate Party		
Florida Whig Party		
Independence Party		
Objectivist Party		
Tea Party		

== See also ==
- Political party strength in Florida
