= Political parties in the United States =

American electoral politics have been dominated by successive pairs of major political parties since shortly after the founding of the United States. Since the 1850s, the two largest political parties have been the Democratic Party and the Republican Party—which together have won every United States presidential election since 1852 and controlled the United States Congress since at least 1856. Despite keeping the same names, the two parties have evolved in terms of ideologies, positions, and support bases over their long lifespans, in response to social, cultural, and economic developments—the Democratic Party being the left-of-center party since the time of the New Deal, and the Republican Party now being the right-of-center party.

Political parties are not mentioned in the U.S. Constitution, which predates the party system. The two-party system is based on laws, party rules, and custom. Several third parties also operate in the U.S. and occasionally have a member elected to local office; some of the larger ones include the Constitution, Green, Alliance, and Libertarian parties, with the Libertarian being the largest third party since the 1980s. A small number of members of the U.S. Congress, a larger number of political candidates, and a good many voters (35–45%) (Note: In 48 surveys conducted regularly by Gallup between August 15–30, 2019, and September 1–16, 2022, no more than 50% and no fewer than 35% of respondents ever identified as independent.) have no party affiliation. However, most self-described independents consistently support one of the two major parties when it comes time to vote, and members of Congress with no political party affiliation caucus to pursue common legislative objectives with either the Democrats or Republicans. (Note: For example, the only two independents serving in the U.S. Congress as of late 2022 were Senators Angus King and Bernie Sanders.: While King has sometimes caucused with Republicans, after the 2014 mid-term elections, he stated that he would continue to caucus with Democrats in the Senate minority. According to a 2013 National Journal rating, "King's voting record makes him more a more reliable Democratic vote than 11 other Senate Democrats".; Sanders has caucused with House and Senate Democrats for most of his congressional career.)

The need to win popular support in a republic led to the American invention of voter-based political parties in the 1790s. Americans were especially innovative in devising new campaign techniques that linked public opinion with public policy through the party. Political scientists and historians have divided the development of America's two-party system into six or so eras or "party systems", starting with the Federalist Party, which supported the ratification of the Constitution, and the Anti-Administration party (Anti-Federalists), which opposed a powerful central government and later became the Democratic-Republican Party.

== History and political eras ==
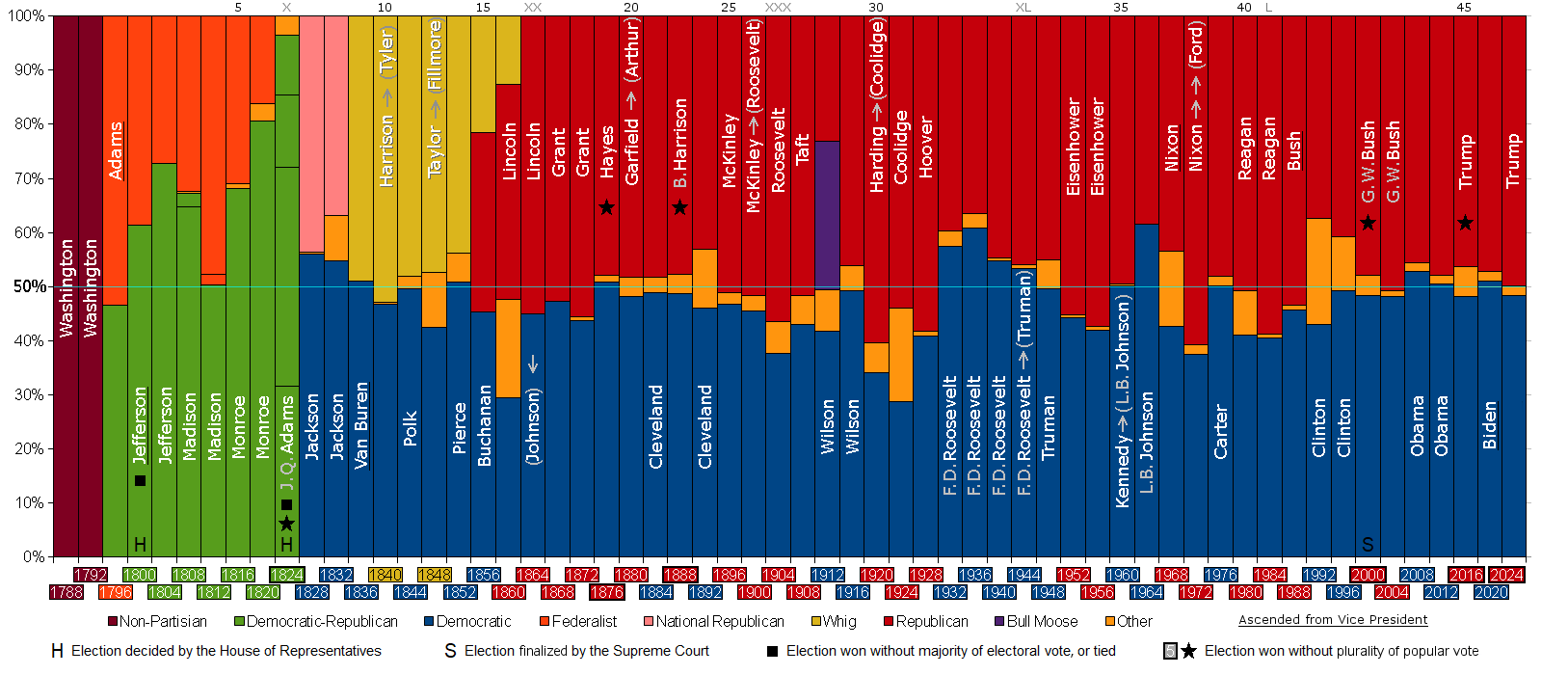
Popular votes to political parties during U.S. presidential elections

Derivation of U.S. political parties (dotted line means "unofficially")

=== Overview ===
The subject of political parties is not mentioned in the United States Constitution. The Founding Fathers did not originally intend for American politics to be partisan. In Federalist No. 9 and No. 10, Alexander Hamilton and James Madison, respectively, wrote specifically about the dangers of domestic political factions. In addition, the first President of the United States, George Washington, was not a member of any political party at the time of his election nor throughout his tenure as president. Furthermore, he hoped that political parties would not form, fearing conflict and stagnation, as outlined in his Farewell Address. Historian Richard Hofstadter wrote that the Founders "did not believe in parties as such, scorned those that they were conscious of as historical models, had a keen terror of party spirit and its evil consequences", but "almost as soon as their national government was in operation, [they] found it necessary to establish parties."

Since their creation in the 1800s, the two dominant parties have changed their ideologies and bases of support considerably, while maintaining their names. In the aftermath of the U.S. Civil War, the Democratic party was an agrarian, pro-states-rights, anti-civil rights, pro-easy money, anti-tariff, anti-bank coalition of Jim Crow Solid South and Western small farmers. Budding labor unions and Catholic immigrants were the primary participants in the Democratic Party of the time. During the same period, the dominant Republican party was composed of large and small business owners, skilled craftsmen, clerks, professionals, and freed African Americans, based especially in the industrial northeast.

By the start of the 21st-century, the Democratic party had shifted to become a left-wing party, disproportionately composed of women, LGBT people, union members, and urban, educated, younger, non-white voters. At the same time, the Republican party had shifted to become a right-wing party, disproportionately composed of family business, older, rural, southern, religious, and white working-class voters. Along with this realignment, political and ideological polarization increased and norms deteriorated, leading to greater tension and "deadlocks" in attempts to pass ideologically controversial bills.

=== First Party System: 1792–1824 (Federalist vs Democratic-Republican) ===
The beginnings of the American two-party system emerged from George Washington's immediate circle of advisers, which included Alexander Hamilton and James Madison. Hamilton and Madison wrote against political factions in The Federalist Papers (1788), but by the 1790s, differing views concerning the course of the new country had developed, and people who held these views tried to win support for their cause by banding together.

Followers of Hamilton's ideology took up the name "Federalist"; they favored a strong central government that would support the interests of commerce and industry and close ties to Britain. Followers of the ideology of Madison and Thomas Jefferson, initially referred to as "Anti-Federalists", became known as Republicans, which for clarity's sake is today called the "Democratic-Republicans"; they preferred a decentralized agrarian republic in which the federal government had limited power.

The Jeffersonians came to power in 1800. The Federalists survived in the Northeast, but their refusal to support the War of 1812 verged on secession and was a devastating blow to the party when the war ended well. The Era of Good Feelings under President James Monroe (1816–1824) marked the end of the First Party System and was a brief period in which partisanship was minimal.

=== Second Party System: 1828–1854 (Democratic vs Whig) ===
By 1828, the Federalists had disappeared as an organization, and Andrew Jackson's presidency split the Democratic-Republican Party: "Jacksonians" became the Democratic Party, while those following the leadership of John Quincy Adams became the National Republican Party (unrelated to the later Republican Party). After the 1832 election, opponents of Jackson—primarily National Republicans, Anti-Masons, and others—coalesced into the Whig Party led by Henry Clay. This marked the return of the two-party political system, but with different parties.

The early Democratic Party stood for individual rights and state rights, supported the primacy of the Presidency (executive branch) over the other branches of government, and opposed banks (namely the Bank of the United States), high tariffs, and modernizing programs that they felt would build up industry at the expense of farmers. It styled itself as the party of the "common man". Presidents Andrew Jackson, Martin Van Buren, and James K. Polk were all Democrats who defeated Whig candidates, but by narrow margins. Jackson's populist appeal and campaigning inspired a tradition of not just voting for a Democrat, but identifying as a Democrat; in this way, political parties were becoming a feature of social life, not just politics.

The Whigs, on the other hand, advocated the supremacy of Congress over the executive branch, as well as policies of modernization and economic protectionism. Central political battles of this era were the Bank War and the spoils system of federal patronage. Presidents William Henry Harrison and Zachary Taylor were both Whig candidates.

In the 1850s, the issue of slavery took center stage, with disagreement in particular over the question of whether slavery should be permitted in the country's new territories in the West. The Whig Party attempted to straddle the issue with the Kansas–Nebraska Act, where the status of slavery would be decided based on popular sovereignty (i.e. the citizens of each territory, rather than Congress, would determine whether slavery would be allowed). The Whig Party sank to its death after the overwhelming electoral defeat by Franklin Pierce in the 1852 presidential election. Ex-Whigs joined the Know Nothing party or the newly formed, anti-slavery Republican Party. While the Know Nothing party was short-lived, Republicans would survive the intense politics leading up to the Civil War. The primary Republican policy was that slavery be excluded from all the territories. Just six years later, this new party captured the presidency when Abraham Lincoln won the election of 1860. This election marked the beginning of the Democratic and Republican parties as the major parties of America.

Presidential election victories by party system (Note: Using the following definitions: First Party System (1796–1824); Second Party System (1828–1852); Third Party System (1856–1892); Fourth Party System (1896–1928); Fifth Party System (1932–1964); Sixth Party System (1968–present))
Party System	Party A	Party B
First	7	1
Second	5	2
Third	3	7
Fourth	2	7
Fifth	7	2
Sixth	6	8

=== Third Party System: 1854–1890s (Democratic vs Republican) ===
The anti-slavery Republican Party emerged in 1854. It adopted many of the economic policies of the Whigs, such as national banks, railroads, high tariffs, homesteads, and aid to land grant colleges.

After the defeat of the Confederacy in the Civil War, the Republican Party became the dominant party in America for decades, associated with the successful military defense of the Union and often known as the "Grand Old Party" (GOP). The Republican coalition consisted of businessmen, shop owners, skilled craftsmen, clerks, and professionals who were attracted to the party's modernization policies and newly enfranchised African Americans (freedmen).

The Democratic Party was usually in opposition during this period, although it often controlled the Senate or the House of Representatives or both. The Democrats were known as "basically conservative and agrarian-oriented", and like the Republicans, the Democrats were a broad-based voting coalition. Democratic support came from the Redeemers of the Jim Crow "Solid South" (i.e. solidly Democratic), where "repressive legislation and physical intimidation [were] designed to prevent newly enfranchised African Americans from voting". Further Democratic support came from small farmers in the West before the Sun Belt boom. Both regions were much less populated than the North, yet politically powerful. Additional Democratic voters included conservative pro-business Bourbon Democrats, traditional Democrats in the North (many of them former Copperheads), and Catholic immigrants.

As the party of states' rights, post-Civil War Democrats opposed civil rights legislation. As the (sometimes) populist party of small farmers, it opposed the interests of big business, such as protective tariffs that raised prices on imported goods needed by rural people. The party favored cheap-money policies, including low interest rates and inflation favoring those with substantial debts, such as small farmers.

Civil War and Reconstruction issues polarized the parties until the Compromise of 1877, which saw the withdrawal of the last federal troops from the Southern United States. (By 1905 most black people were effectively disenfranchised in every Southern state.)

During the post-Civil War era of the nineteenth century, parties were well-established as the country's dominant political organizations, and party allegiance had become an important part of most people's consciousness. Party loyalty was passed from fathers to sons, and in an era before motion pictures and radio, party activities, including spectacular campaign events complete with uniformed marching groups and torchlight parades, were a part of the social life of many communities.

=== Fourth Party System: 1896–1932 (Democratic vs Republican) ===
1896 saw the beginning of the Progressive Era. The Republican Party still dominated and the interest groups and voting blocs were unchanged, but the central domestic issues changed to government regulation of railroads and large corporations ("trusts"), the protective tariff, the role of labor unions, child labor, the need for a new banking system, corruption in party politics, primary elections, direct election of senators, racial segregation, efficiency in government, women's suffrage, and control of immigration.

Some realignment took place, giving Republicans dominance in the industrial Northeast and new strength in the border states.

The era began after the Republicans blamed the Democrats for the Panic of 1893, which later resulted in William McKinley's victory over William Jennings Bryan in the 1896 presidential election.

=== Fifth Party System: 1932–1976 (Democratic vs Republican) ===
The disruption and suffering of the Great Depression (1929–1939), and the New Deal programs (1933–39) of Democratic President Franklin D. Roosevelt designed to deal with it, created a dramatic political shift. The Democrats were now the party of "big government", the dominant party (retaining the presidency until 1952 and controlling both houses of Congress for most of the period from the 1930s to the mid-1990s), and positioned towards liberalism while conservatives increasingly dominated the GOP.

The New Deal raised the minimum wage, established Social Security, and created other federal services. Roosevelt "forged a broad coalition—including small farmers, Northern city dwellers with 'urban political machines', organized labor, European immigrants, Catholics, Jews, African Americans, liberals, intellectuals, and reformers", as well as traditionally Democratic segregationist white Southerners.

Opposition Republicans were split between a conservative wing, led by Ohio Senator Robert A. Taft, and a more successful moderate wing exemplified by the politics of Northeastern leaders such as Nelson Rockefeller, Jacob Javits, and Henry Cabot Lodge. The latter steadily lost influence inside the GOP after 1964.

Civil rights legislation driven by Democratic President Lyndon B. Johnson, such as the Civil Rights Act of 1964 and Voting Rights Act of 1965, along with Barry Goldwater's 1964 presidential campaign and later President Richard Nixon's "Southern strategy", began the breaking of white segregationist Solid South away from the Democratic Party and their migration towards the Republican Party. Southern white voters started voting for Republican presidential candidates in the 1950s, and Republican state and local candidates in the 1990s.

=== Sixth Party System: 1980–2016 (Democratic vs Republican) ===
Around 1968, a breakup of the old Democratic Party New Deal coalition began and American politics became more polarized along ideology. The following decades saw the dissipation of the blurred ideological character of political party coalitions. Previously, there were Democratic elected officials (mostly in the South) who were considerably more conservative than many Republican senators and governors (for example, Nelson Rockefeller). Even Jimmy Carter, who ultimately served as a transitional President in the wake of the Nixon scandals, was considered by many at the time to possibly be a closet boll weevil Democrat.

In time, not only did conservative Democrats and liberal Republicans retire, switch parties, or lose elections, so did centrists (such as Rudy Giuliani, George Pataki, Richard Riordan, and Arnold Schwarzenegger).

Eventually a large nationwide majority of rural and working-class whites became the base of the Republican Party, while the Democratic Party was increasingly made up of a coalition of African Americans, Latinos, and white urban progressives. Whereas college-educated voters had historically skewed heavily towards the Republican party, high educational attainment was increasingly a marker of Democratic support. Together, this formed the political system in the Reagan Era of the 1980s and beyond.

In 1980, conservative Republican Ronald Reagan defeated incumbent Democratic President Jimmy Carter on a platform of smaller government and sunny optimism that free trade and tax cuts would stimulate economic growth, which would then "trickle down" to the middle and lower classes (who might not benefit initially from these policies). The Republican Party was now said to rest on "three legs": Christian right social conservatism (particularly the anti-abortion movement), fiscal conservatism and small government (particularly supporting tax cuts), and strong anti-communist military policy (with increased willingness to intervene abroad).

=== Proposed Seventh Party System: 2016?–present (Democratic vs Republican) ===
While there is no consensus that a Seventh Party System has begun, many have noted unique features of a political era starting with the 2016 presidential campaign of Donald Trump. (Note: It has been argued that a Seventh Party System has already started. Mark D. Brewer and L. Sandy Maisel speculate that "in the wake of Donald Trump's 2016 presidential victory, there is now strengthening debate as to whether we are entering a new party system as Trump fundamentally reshapes the Republican party and the Democratic party responds and evolves as well." If the Seventh Party System has not started yet, the Sixth Party System would be the longest party system ever, surpassing the forty years of the Third Party System. However, even by those that do believe it has started, there is no consensus on the exact start date of the Seventh Party System.)

During and following the campaign, "Reagan Revolution" rhetoric and policy began to be replaced by new themes in the Republican Party. There was more emphasis on cultural conservatism (opposition not just to abortion, but also the legalization of gay marriage and transgender ideology). Additionally, support for free trade and liberal immigration was replaced by opposition to economic globalization and illegal, undocumented immigration (mostly from non-European countries). Distrust of institutions and loyalty for President Donald Trump became common among Republican voters during this time.

Although conservative blue-collar workers migrated to the Republican Party, an upper business class, historically part of the Republican Party since the Gilded Age, began moving left. Conservative New York Times columnist Ross Douthat has argued that "Today's G.O.P. is most clearly now the party of local capitalism—the small-business gentry, the family firms", while "much of corporate America has swung culturally into liberalism’s camp. [...] The party’s base regards corporate institutions—especially in Silicon Valley, but extending to more traditional capitalist powers—as cultural enemies".

View source data.

== Minor parties and independents ==
Although American politics have been dominated by the two-party system, third political parties have appeared from time to time in American history, but seldom lasted more than a decade. They have sometimes been the vehicle of an individual (as in Theodore Roosevelt's "Bull Moose" party, and Ross Perot's Reform Party); had considerable strength in particular regions (such as the Socialist Party, Farmer-Labor Party of Minnesota, Wisconsin Progressive Party, Conservative Party of New York State, (Note: In 1970 a candidate of the Conservative Party of New York State (James L. Buckley) defeated the Democratic and Republican party candidates for U.S. Senate.) and Populist Party); or continued to run candidates for office to publicize ideas despite seldom winning even local elections (Libertarian Party, Natural Law Party, Peace and Freedom Party).

The oldest third party was the Anti-Masonic Party, which was formed in upstate New York in 1828. The party's creators feared the Freemasons, believing they were a powerful secret society that was attempting to rule the country in defiance of republican principles. By 1840, the party had been supplanted by the Whig Party.

Some other significant but unsuccessful parties that ran a candidate for president include: the Know Nothing or American Party (1844–1860), the People's Party (Populist) candidate James B. Weaver (1892), Theodore Roosevelt's Progressive or "Bull Moose party" (1912), Robert M. La Follette's Progressive Party (1924), Strom Thurmond's Dixiecrat States Rights Party (1948), Henry A. Wallace's Progressive Party (1948), George Wallace's American Independent Party (1968), and Ross Perot running as an independent in 1992 and for the Reform Party in 1996.

== Organization of American political parties ==
American political parties are more loosely organized than those in other countries, and the Democratic and Republican parties have no formal organization at the national level that controls membership. Thus, for example, in many states the process to determine a party's candidate for office is a public election (a political primary) open to all who have signed up as affiliated with that party when they register to vote, not just those who donate money and are active in the party.

Party identification becomes somewhat formalized when a person runs for partisan office. In most states, this means declaring oneself a candidate for the nomination of a particular party and one's intention to enter that party's primary election for office. A party committee may choose to endorse candidate(s) seeking the nomination, but in the end the choice is up to those who choose to vote in the primary, and it is often difficult to tell who will be voting.

The result is that American political parties have weak central organizations and little central ideology, except by consensus. Unlike in many countries, the party leadership cannot prevent a person who disagrees with basic principles and positions of the party, or actively works against the party's aims, from claiming party membership, so long as primary election voters elect that person. Once in office, elected officials who fail to "toe the party line" because of constituent opposition to it, and "cross the aisle" to vote with the opposition, have (relatively) little to fear from their party. An elected official may change parties simply by declaring such intent.

At the federal level, each of the two major parties has a national committee (the Democratic National Committee and Republican National Committee) that acts as the hub for much fund-raising and campaign activities, particularly in presidential campaigns. The exact composition of these committees is different for each party, but they are made up primarily of representatives from state parties, affiliated organizations, and others important to the party. However, the national committees do not have the power to direct the activities of members of the party.

Both parties also have separate campaign committees which work to elect candidates at a specific level. The most significant of these are the "Hill committees", which work to elect candidates to each house of Congress.

State parties exist in all fifty states, though their structures differ according to state law, as well as party rules at both the national and the state level.

Despite these weak organizations, elections are still usually portrayed as national races between the political parties. In what is known as "presidential coattails", candidates in presidential elections become the de facto leader of their respective party, and thus usually bring out supporters who in turn vote for the party's candidates for other offices. On the other hand, federal midterm elections (where only Congress, and not the president, is up for election) are usually regarded as a referendum on the sitting president's performance, with voters either voting in or out the president's party's candidates, which in turn helps the next session of Congress to either pass or block the president's agenda, respectively.

=== The two-party system in the U.S. ===
As noted above, the modern political party system in the United States has traditionally been dominated by two parties, with the parties being the Democratic Party and the Republican Party. Explanations for why America has a two-party system include:

- The traditional American electoral format of single-member districts where the candidate with the most votes wins ("first-past-the-post" system), which according to Duverger's law favors the two-party system. This is in contrast to multi-seat electoral districts (Note: Not to be confused with the American systems of having two senators representing each state, since the senators' elections in each state are staggered and do not run at the same time.) and proportional representation found in some other democracies.
- The 19th-century innovation of printing "party tickets" to pass out to prospective voters to cast in ballot boxes (originally, voters went to the polls and publicly stated which candidate they supported), "consolidated the power of the major parties".
- Printed "party tickets" were eventually replaced by uniform ballots provided by the state, when states began to adopt the Australian Secret Ballot Method. This gave state legislatures—dominated by Democrats and Republicans—the opportunity to handicap new rising parties with ballot access laws requiring a large number of petition signatures from citizens and giving the petitioners a short length of time to gather the signatures.

Political scientist Nelson W. Polsby argued in 1997 that the lack of central control of the parties in America means they have become as much "labels" to mobilize voters as political organizations, and that "variations (sometimes subtle, sometimes blatant) in the 50 political cultures of the states yield considerable differences", suggesting that "the American two-party system" actually masks "something more like a hundred-party system." Other political scientists, such as Lee Drutman and Daniel J. Hopkins in 2018, argued that in the 21st century, along with becoming overly partisan, America politics has become overly focused on national issues and "nationalized".

== Major parties ==
American voter registration statistics as of October 2020
Party	Registered voters	Percentage
Democratic	45,512,696	38.62
Republican	37,314,494	30.44
No party preference	34,798,906	28.39
Other	3,127,800	2.55
Totals	122,577,294	100.00

=== Democratic Party ===
The Democratic Party is the major contemporary left-wing political party in the United States. Founded as the Democratic Party in 1828 by Andrew Jackson and Martin Van Buren, it is the oldest extant voter-based political party in the world.

Since 1912, the Democratic Party has positioned itself as the liberal party on domestic issues. The economic philosophy of Franklin D. Roosevelt, which has strongly influenced modern American liberalism, has shaped much of the party's agenda since 1932. Roosevelt's New Deal coalition controlled the White House until 1969, with the exception of the two terms of President Eisenhower from 1953 to 1961. Until the mid-20th century, the Democratic Party was the dominant party among white southerners, and was then the party most associated with the defense of slavery. Following the Great Society under Lyndon B. Johnson, the Democratic Party became a more progressive party on issues of civil rights, and would slowly lose dominance in southern states until 1996. Since the mid-20th century, Democrats have generally been on the center-left and supported social justice, social liberalism, a mixed economy, and the welfare state; Bill Clinton and other New Democrats have pushed for free trade and neoliberalism, which is seen to have shifted the party rightwards.

Into the 21st century, Democrats are strongest in the Northeast, West Coast, and major American urban centers. African Americans and Latinos tend to be disproportionately Democratic, as do trade unions. In 2004, it was the largest political party, with 72 million registered voters (42.6% of a total 169 million registered) claiming affiliation. Although his party lost the election for president in 2004, Barack Obama would later go on to become president in 2009 and stay president until January 2017. Obama was the 15th Democrat to hold the office, and, from the 2006 midterm elections until the 2014 midterm elections, the Democratic Party was also the majority party in the United States Senate. A 2011 USA Today review of state voter rolls indicates that the number of registered Democrats declined in 25 of 28 states (some states do not register voters by party). During this time, Republican registration also declined, as independent or no preference voting was on the rise. In 2011, the number of Democrats shrank by 800,000, and from 2008 they were down by 1.7 million, or 3.9%. In 2018, the Democratic Party was the largest in the United States with roughly 60 million registered members.

=== Republican Party ===
The Republican Party is the major contemporary right-wing political party in the United States. Since the 1880s, it has been nicknamed by the media the "Grand Old Party", or GOP, although it is younger than the Democratic Party. Founded in 1854 by Northern anti-slavery activists and modernizers, the Republican Party rose to prominence in 1860 with the election of Abraham Lincoln, who used the party machinery to support victory in the American Civil War.

The GOP dominated national politics during the Third Party System from 1854 to 1896 and the Fourth Party System from 1896 to 1932. Since the early 20th century, the Republican Party has been the more market-oriented of the two American political parties, often favoring policies that aid American business interests. As a party whose power was once based on the support of Union Army veterans, this party has traditionally supported more robust national defense measures and improved veterans' benefits. Throughout history, the Republican Party has supported an American conservative platform, with further foundations in economic liberalism, fiscal conservatism, and social conservatism. However the 2016 election of Donald Trump signaled a shift in the party towards right-wing populism and nationalism, raising questions on whether if the party is still conservative.

The Republican Party tends to be strongest in the Southern United States, outside large metropolitan areas, or in less-centralized, lower-density parts of them. Republicans held a majority in the United States House of Representatives from the 2010 midterm elections until the 2018 midterms, when they lost it to the Democratic Party. Additionally, from the 2014 elections to the 2020 elections, the Republican Party controlled the Senate. In 2018, the Republican party had roughly 55 million registered members, making it the second largest party in the United States. In the aftermath of the 2020 United States elections, the GOP lost their Senate majority, and Democrat Chuck Schumer was appointed Senate Majority Leader in a power-sharing agreement with the Republican Party. In the 2024 United States Election, power shifted to the Republican Party as they held a trifecta in government for the 119th United States Congress.

== Minor parties ==
The United States also has an array of minor parties, the largest of which (on the basis of voter registrations as of October 2020) are the Libertarian, Green, and Constitution parties. (There are many other political parties that receive only minimal support and only appear on the ballot in one or a few states.)

=== Libertarian Party ===
The Libertarian Party was founded on December 11, 1972. As of March 2021, it is the largest third party in the United States, claiming nearly 700,000 registered voters across 28 states and the District of Columbia. As of September 2025, it has 184 local elected officials. Former Representative Justin Amash, a former Republican and later independent from Michigan, switched to the Libertarian Party in May 2020, becoming the first Libertarian Party member of Congress. Amash declined to run for reelection in 2020 and left office on January 3, 2021.

The 2012 Libertarian Party nominee for United States President was former New Mexico governor, Gary Johnson. He achieved ballot access in every state except for Michigan (only as a write-in candidate) and Oklahoma. He received over one million votes in the election. In 2016, Johnson ran again, receiving over four million votes, or 3.3% of the popular vote.

The Libertarian Party's core platform is the reduction of the size, influence, and expenditures in all levels of government. To this effect, the party supports minimally regulated markets, a less powerful federal government, strong civil liberties, drug liberalization, open immigration, non-interventionism, neutrality in diplomatic relations, free trade, free movement to all foreign countries, and a transition to a more representative republic.

=== Green Party ===
The Green Party has been active as a third party since the 1980s. The party first gained widespread public attention during Ralph Nader's second presidential run in 2000. Currently, the primary national Green Party organization in the U.S. is the Green Party of the United States, which split from and eclipsed the earlier Greens/Green Party USA.

The Green Party in the United States has won elected office mostly at the local level; most winners of public office in the United States who are considered Greens have won nonpartisan-ballot elections (that is, elections in which the candidates' party affiliations were not printed on the ballot). In 2005, the Party had 305,000 registered members in the District of Columbia and 20 states that allow party registration. During the 2006 elections, the party had ballot access in 31 states. In 2017, Ralph Chapman, a Representative in the Maine House of Representatives, switched his association from Unaffiliated to the Green Independent Party.

The Green Party of the United States generally holds a left-wing ideology on most important issues. Greens emphasize environmentalism, non-hierarchical participatory democracy, social justice, respect for diversity, peace, and nonviolence. As of October 2020, it is the fourth largest political party in the United States based on voter registration.

=== Constitution Party ===
The Constitution Party is a national conservative political party in the United States. It was founded as the U.S. Taxpayers Party in 1992 by Howard Phillips. The party's official name was changed to the "Constitution Party" in 1999; however, some state affiliate parties are known under different names. As of October 2020, it is the fifth largest political party in the United States based on voter registration.

=== Alliance Party ===
The Alliance Party is a centrist American political party that was formed in 2018 and registered in 2019. The Alliance Party gained affiliation status with multiple other parties, including the American Party of South Carolina, the Independence Party of Minnesota, and the Independent Party of Connecticut. During the 2020 presidential elections, Alliance Party Presidential Candidate Roque De La Fuente placed fifth in terms of the popular vote. Following the presidential election, the American Delta Party and the Independence Party of New York joined the Alliance Party. The Independence Party of New York disaffiliated in 2021.

=== Vermont Progressive Party ===
The Vermont Progressive Party is a political party that is active in Vermont and is the third largest party in the state, behind the Democratic and Republican parties. Despite operating only in one state, the Vermont Progressives, as of November 2024, have managed to have more of its candidates elected as state legislators than all other third parties in the United States. By this standard, the Progressives are the third largest party in the United States, not just in Vermont. As of November 2024, the Forward Party is the only other third party with state legislators, having two Pennsylvania State Senate members. The Progressives are notable for reliably electing candidates to office and in some areas, such as the Burlington City Council, have previously held a majority in recent years.

== Alternative interpretations ==
Multiple individuals from various stances have proposed an end to the two-party system, arguing mostly that the Democratic and Republican parties don't accurately represent much of the national electorate, or that multiple political parties already exist within the Democratic and Republican parties, which encompass a variety of views.

=== Four-party interpretations ===
NBC News' Dante Chinni and Washington Post columnist Perry Bacon Jr. have both suggested that the United States' political system is that of four parties grouped into a two-party system. Due mostly to competing influence from larger personalities within such parties, Chinni and Bacon have grouped the American populace into four primary political parties:

- Trump Republicans, considered to be part of the “MAGA Movement” which includes Donald Trump's followers, Ron DeSantis, the Christian right, and the America First crowd. In light of President Biden's 2020 win, this group has been seen as the least willing to compromise with Biden and the most likely to believe the 2020 election was stolen.
- Party Republicans, or "the Old Guard", consisting of Trump-skeptical and anti-Trump Republicans such as Mitch McConnell, Mitt Romney, and Larry Hogan. This group's intention is focused on preserving the traditional Republican agenda of lifting regulations and cutting taxes.
- Moderate Democrats, composed of Joe Biden, Nancy Pelosi, Eric Adams, some members of the Never Trump movement, and the Third Way movement. This group is currently the strongest and prefers to pass a moderate Democratic agenda, which includes bipartisanship work to reform programs like healthcare.
- Left-wing Democrats, the most likely to embrace progressive politics and who are more willing to hinder moderates' agenda in favor of more left-wing policies. This faction's leaders include Alexandria Ocasio-Cortez, Bernie Sanders, Pramila Jayapal, and the Progressive Caucus.

=== Six-party interpretations ===
The idea the United States primarily falls into six political parties is argued for by American political theorists Lee Drutman and Carl Davidson and former Secretary of Labor Robert Reich. Drutman argues that government without two parties would enable and support "the shifting alliances and bargaining that are essential in democracy" which have largely been lost in a two-party system due to political gridlock. Reich further predicts that these parties likely emerge as the two parties "explode".

All three theorists have consensus that these four parties will exist within a six-party system:

- One party would be founded on hard-line supporters of Donald Trump, his namesake grouping of ideas, economic nationalism, and right-wing populism.
- Establishment Republicans would be composed of socially moderate but pro-business (Rockefeller-style) Republicans, corporations, and existing GOP megadonors who aspire to cut their taxes. Both Reich and Davidson attribute this to be the party of big business, and cite ExxonMobil and other Big Oil companies in particular as examples.
- Christian nationalists and Christian conservatives would form their own voting bloc. Davidson notes that the Koch family and Betsy DeVos are major backers of this segment of the populace.
- American progressives would form a bloc which would push an agenda advocating for social justice, full LGBTQ rights, ending crony capitalism, and fighting climate change. Those who identify as socialist within the American political system would be core members. Its funding base is primarily unions and grassroots donations.

The three interpretations, however, differ on the inclusion of these parties:

- Reich views libertarians, and the Tea Party and Freedom Caucus movements, as anti-establishment Republicans who aspire to shrink government and also end crony capitalism. Drutman views these groups as split between the party of Trumpism and Christian conservatives, and Davidson views the Tea Party and Freedom Caucus as the foundations for his Christian nationalists party.
- Drutman outlines another party which aims to represent working-class democrats who are as economically liberal, but not as socially liberal, as American progressives.
- Davidson splits moderate Democrats into two parties: the first is named for the Blue Dog Coalition and aligns more so with United Steelworkers and the pharmaceutical industry, while the other represents mainstream Democrats and is symbolized by Barack Obama, Nancy Pelosi, Hollywood personalities, and large banks like JPMorgan Chase. Drutman and Reich, however, categorize both as "Establishment Democrats" who prefer tax cuts but also back equal rights.

== Ballot-qualified political parties by state ==
As of May 2025

State	Alliance Party	Constitution Party	Democratic Party	Forward Party	Green Party	Libertarian Party	Legal Marijuana Now Party	Republican Party	Unity Party of America	Working Class Party	Working Families Party	Other political parties	Reference
AL			D					R					
AK			D			L		R				(Note: Alaskan Independence Party)	
AZ			D		G	L		R					
AR			D			L		R					
CA			D		G	L		R				(Note: American Independent Party; Peace and Freedom Party)	
CO		C	D	F	G	L		R	U			(Note: Approval Voting Party)	
CT	A		D		G	L		R			WF		
DE			D		G	L		R				(Note: Conservative Party of Delaware; Independent Party of Delaware; Liberal Party of Delaware)	
FL	A	C	D	F	G	L		R	U			(Note: Ecology Party; Independent Party of Florida; People’s Party of Florida; Party for Socialism and Liberation of Florida)	
GA			D					R					
HI		C	D		G	L		R				(Note: Aloha ʻĀina Party)	
ID		C	D			L		R					
IL			D					R					
IN			D			L		R				(Note: Lincoln Party)	
IA			D			L		R					
KS			D			L		R					
KY			D					R					
LA			D		G	L		R					
ME			D		G	L		R					
MD			D		G	L		R		WC		(Note: Bread and Roses Party)	
MA			D			L		R				(Note: Libertarian Party of Massachusetts (not affiliated with the national Libertarian Party))	
MI		C	D		G	L		R		WC		(Note: Natural Law Party of Michigan)	
MN	A		D		G	L	M	R				(Note: Grassroots–Legalize Cannabis Party)	
MS			D			L		R				(Note: America First Party; Mississippi Reform Party; Justice Party)	
MO			D			L		R					
MT			D		G	L		R					
NE			D			L	M	R					
NV		C	D			L		R					
NH			D					R					
NJ			D					R					
NM			D		G	L		R			WF	(Note: Libertarian Party of New Mexico (not affiliated with the national Libertarian Party))	
NY			D					R			WF	(Note: Conservative Party)	
NC			D		G	L		R					
ND			D					R					
OH			D			L		R					
OK			D			L		R					
OR		C	D		G	L		R			WF	(Note: Independent Party of Oregon; Progressive Party of Oregon)	
PA			D		G	L		R					
RI			D					R					
SC	A	C	D	F	G	L		R				(Note: Labor Party; United Citizens Party)	
SD			D			L		R					
TN			D					R					
TX			D		G	L		R					
UT		C	D	F		L		R				(Note: Independent American Party of Utah)	
VT			D			L		R				(Note: Liberty Union Party; Progressive Party of Vermont)	
VA			D					R					
WA			D					R				(Note: Washington does not officially recognize political parties)	
WV			D		G	L		R					
WI		C	D		G	L		R					
WY		C	D			L		R					

== Independents (unaffiliated) ==
Some political candidates, and many voters, choose not to identify with a particular political party. In some states, Independents are not allowed to vote in primary elections, but in others, they can vote in any primary election that they choose. Although the term "Independent" often is used as a synonym for "moderate", "centrist", or "swing voter" to refer to a politician or voter who holds views that incorporate facets of both liberal and conservative ideologies, most self-described independents consistently support one of the two major parties when it comes time to vote, according to Vox Media.

As of July 2025, two independents serve in the U.S. Congress: Senators Angus King and Bernie Sanders. GovTrack ranks King among the more moderate members of the Senate, near the Senate's ideological center. Sanders describes himself as a "democratic socialist", but sought nomination by the Democratic Party as their candidate for president in 2016; his political platform is said to "define" the "progressive wing" of the Democratic Party.

According to Ballotpedia, as of 2022, there were 24 seats held by independents in state legislatures (in Wyoming, Vermont, Tennessee, New Hampshire, Mississippi, Massachusetts, Minnesota, Maine, Louisiana, California, Arkansas, and Alaska), and 10 seats held by third parties (in Vermont, Maine, New York, and Wyoming; seven seats by the Vermont Progressive Party, and one each for the Independent for Maine Party, Independence Party, and Libertarian Party).

== See also ==
- Political history in the United States, for historiography
- Red states and blue states
