= Edwin Larson =

Edwin Larson may refer to:

- Edwin J. Larson (1885–1949), American politician, member of the Wisconsin State Assembly
- J. Edwin Larson (1900–1965), American politician, member of the Florida Senate
