= Treasurer, Insurance Commissioner and Fire Marshal of Florida =

State office (1845–2003)

The Treasurer/Insurance Commissioner/Fire Marshal (commonly referred to as State Treasurer) is a former statewide constitutional officer of Florida. The office was abolished following the Florida Cabinet reforms of 1998 which took effect in 2003.

A statewide office, with a seat in the Cabinet, the official handled the duties of the state treasurer, insurance commissioner, and fire marshal. These duties included payroll, pensions, tax collection, state finances, insurance regulation, and the investigation of fires. The most visible responsibility of the officeholder was as insurance commissioner.

Following the Cabinet reform, the office was merged with that of the state comptroller to create the new office of Chief Financial Officer of Florida, which oversees the Florida Department of Financial Services. The new department contains many of the functions of the previous offices, but has less direct control over insurance regulation than the previous office did. This was done to lessen the control of one person over financial services regulation in the state.

Tom Gallagher was the last Treasurer/Insurance Commissioner/Fire Marshal and the first CFO. Other persons who held the office included U.S. Senator Bill Nelson and William D. Gunter, Jr.

== Officeholders ==
Treasurers by party affiliation
Party	Treasurers
Democratic	18
Republican	4
Whig	1

Territorial Era (1821–1845)

- Charles H Austin, Sr. - 1833–1835 (died 1837)
- Thomas Hall Austin - ? 1838–1840 - ?
- Henry Livingston Rutgers - 4-Feb-1843–Statehood (see Senate Journal of 4-Feb-1843)

#	Image	Name	Term of Service	Political Party
1		Benjamin Byrd	1845–1848	Democratic
2		William R. Hayward	1848–1853	Whig
3		Charles H. Austin, Jr.	1853–1868	Democratic
4		Simon B. Conover	1868–1873	Republican
5		Charles H. Foster	1873–1877	Republican
6		Walter Gwynn	1877–1881	Democratic
7		Henry A. l'Engle	1881–1885	Democratic
8		Edward S. Crill	1885–1889	Democratic
9		Francis J. Pons	1889–1891	Democratic
10		E. J. Triay	1891–1893	Democratic
11		Clarence B. Collins	1893–1897	Democratic
12		James B. Whitfield	1897–1903	Democratic
13		William V. Knott	1903–1912	Democratic
14		J. C. Luning	1912–1928	Democratic
15		William V. Knott	1928–1941	Democratic
16		J. Edwin Larson	1941–1965	Democratic
17		Broward Williams	1965–1971	Democratic
18		Thomas D. O'Malley Jr.	1971–1975	Democratic
19		Phil Ashler	1975–1976	Democratic
20		Bill Gunter	1976–1989	Democratic
21		Tom Gallagher	1989–1995	Republican
22		Bill Nelson	1995–2001	Democratic
23		Tom Gallagher	2001–2003	Republican
