= J. Edwin Larson =

American politician (1900 – 1965)

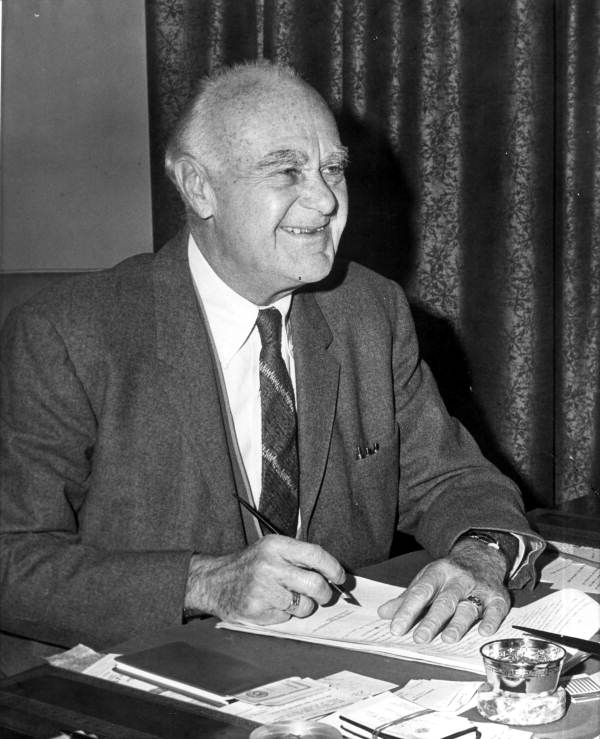
- Larson in 1965

Member of the Florida House of Representatives from Clay County
- In office 1929–1931

Member of the Florida Senate from the 29th district
- In office 1933

Treasurer of Florida
- In office 1941–1965
- Governor: Spessard Holland; Millard Caldwell; Fuller Warren; Daniel T. McCarty; Charley Eugene Johns; LeRoy Collins; C. Farris Bryant; W. Haydon Burns
- Preceded by: William V. Knott
- Succeeded by: Broward Williams

Personal details
- Born: June 27, 1900
- Died: January 24, 1965 (aged 64)
- Party: Democratic

J. Edwin Larson (June 27, 1900 – January 24, 1965) was an American politician. He served as a Democratic member of the Florida House of Representatives. He also served as a member for the 29th district of the Florida Senate.

Party political offices
Preceded by William V. Knott	Democratic nominee for Treasurer, Insurance Commissioner, and Fire Marshal of Florida; 1940, 1944, 1948, 1952, 1956, 1960, 1964	Succeeded by Broward Williams
