= Benjamin E. McLin =

American politician

Benjamin Earnest McLin
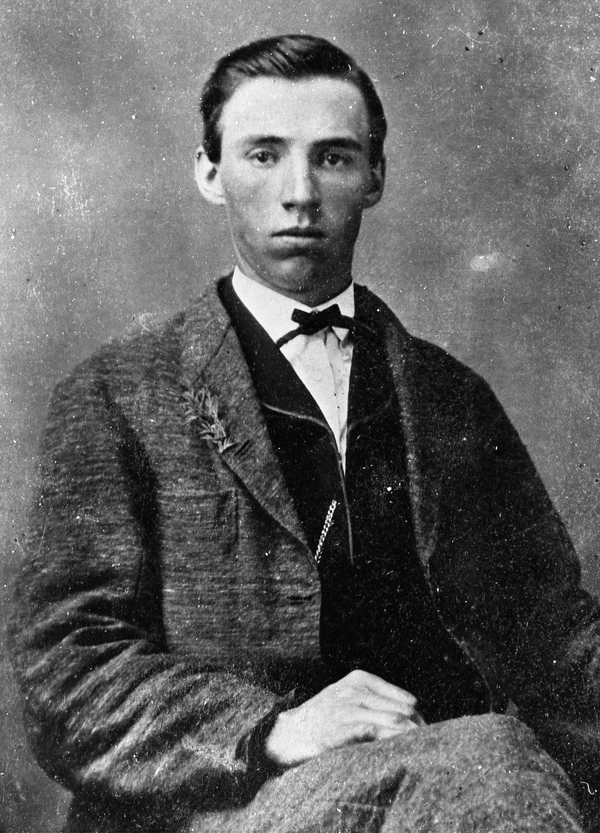

2nd Commissioner of Agriculture of Florida
- In office January 9, 1901 – February 5, 1912
- Governor: William S. Jennings (1901–1905); Napoleon B. Broward (1905–1909); Albert W. Gilchrist (1909–1912)
- Preceded by: Lucius B. Wombwell
- Succeeded by: J.C. Luning
- Majority: 18,694 (1904)

Member of the Florida Senate from the 23rd district
- In office 1895–1899
- Preceded by: Alexander St. Clair-Abrams Sr. father of Alexander St. Clair-Abrams
- Succeeded by: P. W. Butler

Personal details
- Born: September 22, 1851 Greene County, Tennessee
- Died: January 31, 1912 (aged 60) Orlando, Florida
- Party: Democratic
- Spouses: Malinda "Linnie" Peak Smith (m. 1876; died 1886) Josephine Glidewell (m. 1887)
- Children: Eugene Earnest McLin, born September 1882; Walter Smith McLin, born 1884; John Blair McLin, born January 1882; Linnie P. McLin, born July 1889; Ruby Bearden McLin, born November 8, 1892;
- Education: King College; Hampden–Sydney College

Benjamin Earnest McLin (September 22, 1851 – January 31, 1912) was a lawyer, businessman and politician, who was a member of the Florida State Senate, and was the second Commissioner of Agriculture of Florida.

McLin was engaged in the milling business in Lake County. He was also extensively invested in growing and shipping oranges. At one time he also operated the largest orange crate manufacturer in Florida; however, his plant burnt down and was entirely wiped out by fire, and he had no insurance on the plant. Not long after his plant was destroyed, the freeze of 1894–95 swept away his entire orange grove.

He died on January 31, 1912, while attending the Orlando County Fair.

Political offices
Preceded by Lucius B. Wombwell	2nd Commissioner of Agriculture of Florida; January 9, 1901–February 5, 1912	Succeeded by J.C. Luning
Preceded by Alexander St. Clair-Abrams	Member of the Florida Senate from the 23rd district 1895–1899	Succeeded by P. W. Butler
