= A. C. Croom =

American politician (1845–1912)

Alonzo Church Croom
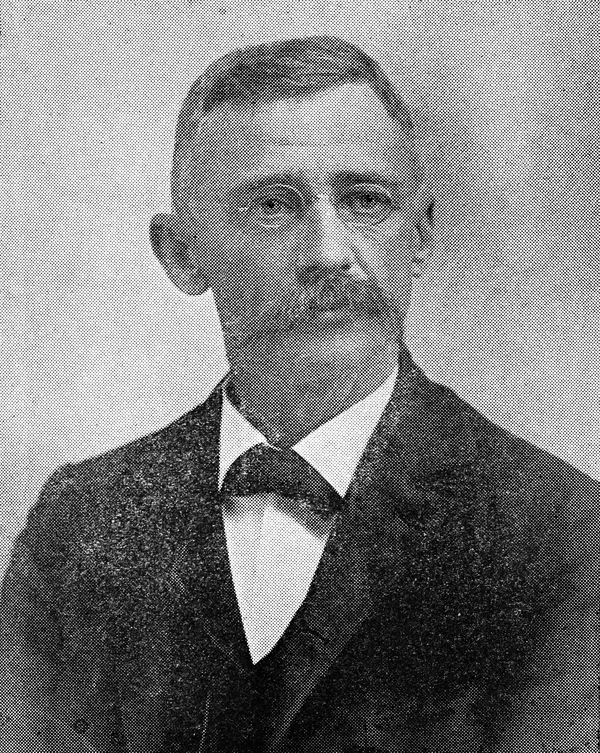

Comptroller of Florida
- In office 1901–1912
- Preceded by: William H. Reynolds
- Succeeded by: William V. Knott

Personal details
- Born: December 1, 1845 Quincy, Florida
- Died: February 7, 1912 (aged 66) Ocala, Florida
- Spouse: Maria Bond (m. 1870)
- Relatives: Alonzo Church (grandfather)

Alonzo Church Croom (December 1, 1845 – December 7, 1912) was an American politician who served as Comptroller of Florida from 1901 until 1912.

His father, George Alexander Croom, owned the Casa de Laga Plantation in Tallahassee, and his mother was the daughter of University of Georgia president Alonzo Church for whom he was named. He was born near Quincy, Florida. Hardy Bryan Croom was his older brother.

He married Maria Bond on April 26, 1870. They had a daughter and son.

He died December 7, 1912, in Ocala, Florida.
