= Thomas D. Bailey =

American superintendent (1897–1974)

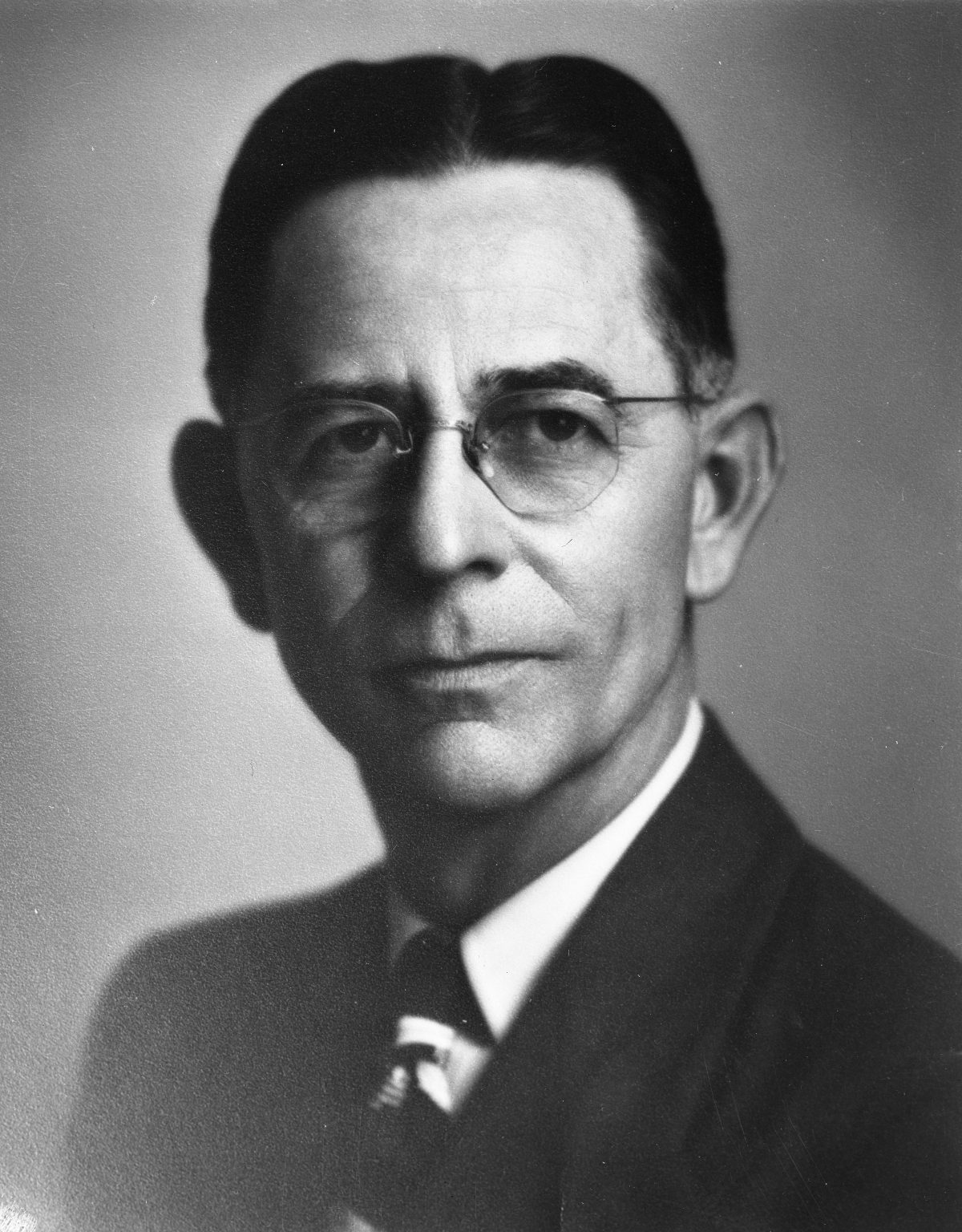
Thomas D. Bailey (circa 1953)

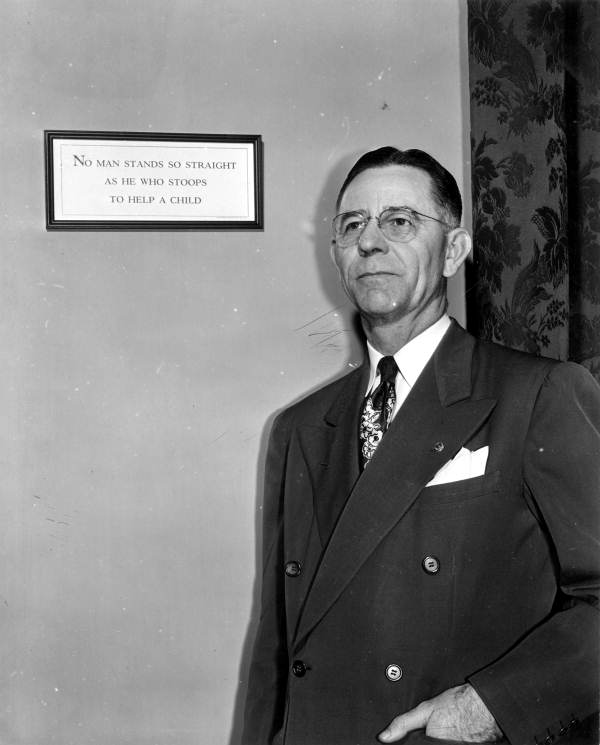
Thomas D. Bailey (1897-1974) with motto

Thomas D. Bailey (October 31, 1897 – August 10, 1974) was an American superintendent. He served as Florida Superintendent of Education from 1949 until 1965.

Bailey was born October 31, 1897, in Lugoff, South Carolina. His education started in the public schools of South Carolina, and he got his Bachelor of Arts degree in 1919 from Wofford College in Spartanburg. He married Miss Burness McConnell and they had two children together, Mrs W. C. McNab and A.L. Shealy Jr.

Bailey began his teaching career in a two-room rural schoolhouse, where he taught grades five through eleven. He spent fourteen years as a teacher and principal DeFuniak Springs, Florida. In 1939, he earned his master's in education from the University of Florida. He then worked as supervising principal in Ocala, Florida until 1944, when he became head of Tampa Public Schools. In 1947, he became the public relations secretary for the Florida Education Association.

Bailey is credited with a handbook on Florida public school bus transportation. He also oversaw the publication of a guide to secondary school mathematics education in Florida, a guide for art education (1965), a guide for science education in Florida's secondary schools, and Biennial Report of the State Department of Education for 1948 to 1950, A collection of his addresses from 1950 until March 1963 was published as Trails in Florida Education.

He opposed having Gay educators, and was a supporter of segregation. He also causes controversy by planning to increase religious training within public schools even though he claimed that it was not his intention to go against "the traditional separation of church and state".

He is pictured in 1951 along with a plaque showing his motto "No man stands so straight as he who stoops to help a child.".

In 1955, he testified before a United States Senate committee on funding for school construction. He spoke about inadequate school buildings to meet the demand of Florida's growing population.

He was selected to wield a shovel at the groundbreaking ceremony for Florida Atlantic University.

He died August 10, 1974, from a heart attack while at the Waynesville, North Carolina County Club. At the time of his death it was noted that he had served as the Florida Superintendent of Education for longer than any other person in the role.

== See also ==
- Pork Chop Gang
