= J. C. Luning =

American politician

J.C. Luning
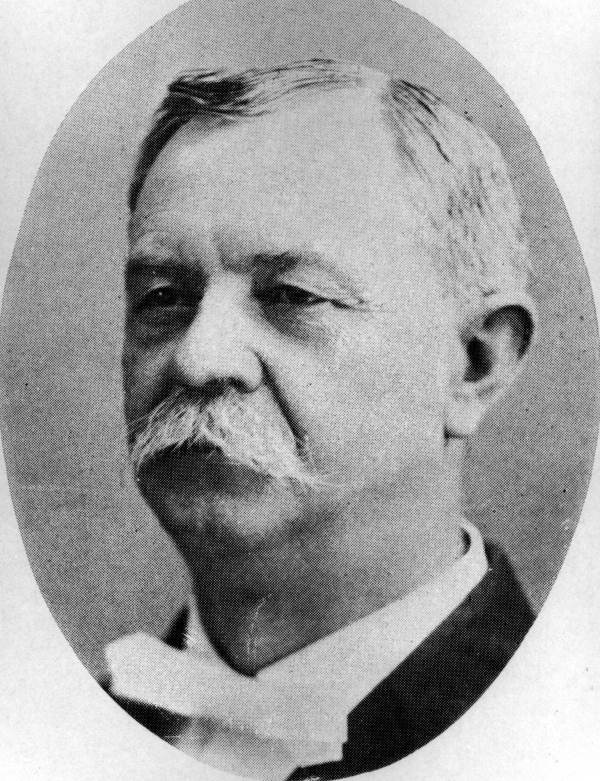

State Treasurer of Florida
- In office February 19, 1912 – September 26, 1928
- Governor: Albert W. Gilchrist; Park Trammell; Sidney J. Catts; Cary A. Hardee; John W. Martin
- Preceded by: William V. Knott
- Succeeded by: William V. Knott

3rd Florida Commissioner of Agriculture
- In office February 5, 1912 – March 1, 1912
- Governor: Albert W. Gilchrist
- Preceded by: Benjamin E. McLin
- Succeeded by: William Allen McRae

Lake County Commission
- In office 1902 - February 1912
- Preceded by: William Allen Mccarthy
- Succeeded by: William Allen Mccarthy

Mayor of the Town of Leesburg, Florida
- In office 1901–1902

Commissioner of the Town of Leesburg, Florida
- In office 1900–1901

Personal details
- Born: John Christian Luning; December 21, 1863 Albany, New York
- Died: September 28, 1928 (aged 64) South Dakota
- Party: Democratic
- Spouse: Mary Warren

John Christian Luning (1863 – 1928) was a mayor of the town of Leesburg, Florida, during the 1890s and Lake County Commissioner. He later served the shortest term as Florida's Commissioner of Agriculture, 14 days, before becoming State Treasurer of Florida. He was part of a group of Florida leaders known as the "Three Musketeers" – along with James B. Whitfield (a state treasurer and state attorney general before serving nearly 40 years on the Florida Supreme Court) and William V. Knott (who held various cabinet positions for nearly 40 continuous years before becoming a political appointee) – and was considered to have a promising political future before his sudden death in September 1928.

== Getting to the state treasurer's office ==
In early 1912, both Florida Commissioner of Agriculture Benjamin E. McLin and Florida Comptroller A.C. Croom died within a week or two of each other while separately campaigning in South Florida in February. Following the death of McLin, Governor Albert W. Gilchrist appointed Luning the Commissioner of Agriculture. When Croom died, Whitfield, Knott, and Luning went to see the Governor. It is reported that Luning intended to apply to be State Comptroller but Gilchrist wanted someone experienced in the position. Knott (who was serving as Treasurer at the time) was appointed to the State Comptroller position. Luning was appointed to fill the state treasurer position Knott vacated on February 19, 14 days after having been appointed as agriculture commissioner. Luning then had to defend his position in the 1912 election. Robert Andrew Gray – who would later serve 31 years as Florida Secretary of State and 31 years on the Florida Board of Education – worked on Luning's campaign and recalled that Luning won a three-way primary by only 150 votes before going on to win the general election. He continued to serve as state treasurer until his death in September 1928.

== Death ==
In his capacity as the ex officio Insurance Commissioner of Florida, Luning went to South Dakota in September 1928 to attend a conference of the National Association of Insurance Commissioners (NAIC). He died on September 26 while riding through the mountains with friends. Luning was a past president of NAIC and was well respected by the organization's members; as a result a delegation of its members escorted his body back to Leesburg. His escort included A. W. Briscoe, a former Alabama Commissioner of Insurance, and Joe F. Little, president of Citizens Life Insurance Company of Alabama.
