= William V. Knott =

American politician

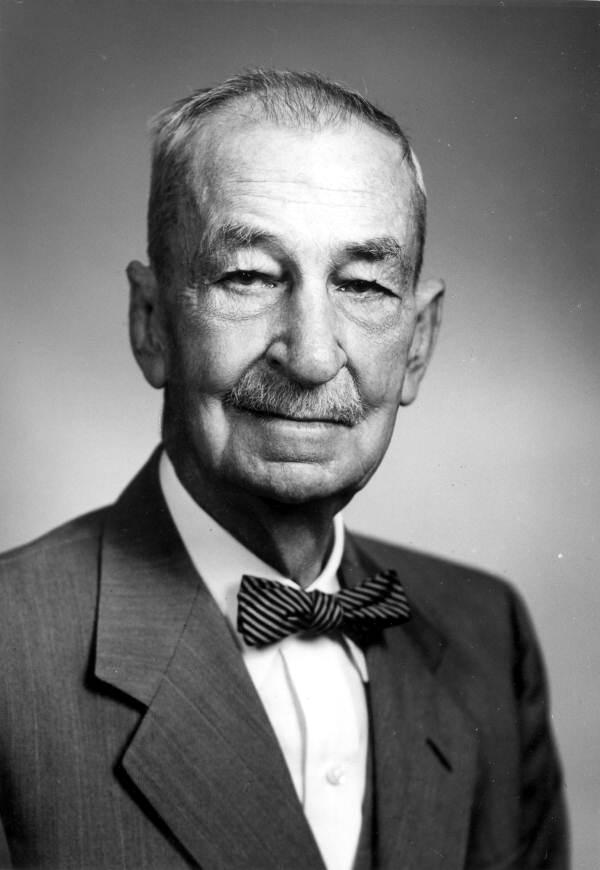
- William V. Knott, 1954

Florida State Treasurer
- In office March 1, 1903 – February 19, 1912; September 28, 1928 – January 3, 1941

Personal details
- Born: November 24, 1863; Terrell County, Georgia, U.S.
- Died: April 3, 1965 (aged 101); Tallahassee, Florida, U.S.
- Political party: Democratic
- Spouse: Luella Pugh (m. 1895)
- Children: 3 -- Dr. Mary Franklin Knott Bazemore, John Charles Knott, Esq., and Hon. James R. Knott

William Valentine Knott (November 24, 1863 – April 3, 1965) was a Florida state politician. He was the Florida State Treasurer from 1928 to 1941.

Born in Terrell County, Georgia, he moved to Florida by wagon in 1881. When he arrived, he helped establish citrus groves with his family along with establishing a phosphate mine and working in local government with his brother, Charles. He married Luella Pugh in 1895 and moved to Tallahassee, Florida, in 1897, taking up the position of the first "financial agent" of the state government. His title was later, in 1901, changed to "State Auditor". He was appointed as state treasurer for the first time in 1903 and to comptroller in 1912 when the incumbent, A. C. Croom, died. He ran unsuccessfully for governor in 1916, defeated by Sidney Johnston Catts and returned to farming and business until he was appointed director of a local hospital in 1921.

He was appointed to his former position as auditor general in 1927 but, in the following year, John Christian Luning, the incumbent state treasurer, died and Knott was re-appointed to that position, serving until his retirement at age 78 in 1941. He is the longest served state treasurer in the state's history, serving under 11 governors.

He died at the age of 101 after collapsing at his home in 1965 and his body lay in state at the Florida State Capitol to allow the public to pay their respects. Luella Knott died eight days following William's death at the age of 93.

Party political offices
Preceded by Park Trammell	Democratic nominee for Governor of Florida; 1916	Succeeded by Cary A. Hardee
