= Green Party of Florida =

Florida affiliate of the Green Party

- Founded: 1992
- Headquarters: Pensacola, Florida, United States
- Membership (2026): ▲9,533
- Ideology: Green politics
- Political position: Left-wing
- National affiliation: Green Party of the United States
- Colors: Green
- Seats in the U.S. Senate: 0 / 2
- Seats in the U.S. House: 0 / 28
- Florida Senate: 0 / 40
- Florida House of Representatives: 0 / 120
- Other elected officials: 0 (February 2024)

Website
- Official website

The Green Party of Florida is the state affiliate of the Green Party of the United States in Florida.

== History ==
The Green Party of Florida was organized in 1992, when the State of Florida applied stringent standards for minor party candidates to qualify for elections. To have statewide ballot status, minor parties had to file a petition with at least 3% of all registered voters. To keep this status, they had to maintain a number of party members equal to 5% of all registered voters.

In 1998, state law concerning access to the state ballot was eased. In February 1999, the state legislature implemented changes allowing any party organized on a state basis to field candidates in elections. This allowed the Green Party and other parties to qualify to field candidates on the ballot. The Green Party has retained its statewide ballot status ever since.

The Florida Green Party has opposed the presence of nuclear power plants in Florida. In fact, the party intervened in the licensing process of the proposed Levy County Nuclear Power Plant, which has yet to be built.

In April 2010, the Florida Green Party and the People's Lobby Coalition for Public Funding Only of All Elections held a public forum at the US National Press Club in Washington, DC. The purpose of the forum was to press for only public funding of elections.

== Organization ==
The state organization has two Co-Chairs, a Treasurer and a Secretary. The Co-Chairs are: Samson LeBeauKpadenou and Laura Potts.

It has a number of committees. These include: the Electoral Committee, the Bylaws Committee, the Website Committee, the Outreach Committee, and the AI (artificial intelligence) Committee. The Electoral Committee helps persons wanting to become candidates and also asks potential candidates about their political views.

The Green Party has many chapters, which are usually county chapters, called affiliates. The state organization constantly seeks to organize new local chapters.

The Florida Green Party is listed as an endorser organization of the Move to Amend. This organization, in its own words, is "dedicated to ending the illegitimate legal doctrines that prevent the American people from governing themselves."

== Registration ==
| Year | Registered Members |
|---|---|
| 1994 | 453 |
| 1996 | 731 |
| 1998 | 965 |
| 2000 | 2,728 |
| 2002 | 5,590 |
| 2004 | 6,646 |
| 2006 | 6,607 |
| 2008 | 6,007 |
| 2010 | 5,827 |
| 2012 | 5,705 |
| 2014 | 5,901 |
| 2016 | 5,438 |
| 2017 | 7,662 |

== Public officials ==
Past and present public officials from the Green Party include:

- Eric Fricker, City Commission, Cocoa Beach Seat 3 (Brevard County) (2000-2004)
- Dan McCrea, City Commission, South Miami (Miami-Dade County) (2003)
- Nadine Burns, City Council, Lake Worth District 3 (Palm Beach County) (2003-2006)
- Kim O'Connor, Soil & Water District Commissioner, Ochlockonee River District 3 (2004–2006) (Leon County) Soil & Water District Commissioner, District 2 (2016-) (Hillsborough County)
- John Baron, Community Commission, Aventura (Miami-Dade County) (2004)
- Cara Jennings, City Commission, Palm Beach District 2 (Lake Worth) (2006–2010)
- Anita Stewart, Hillsborough County Soil & Water Conservation Board, Seat 5 (2010–2014)

== Presidential nominee results ==
Since 1996, the Green Party has run a candidate for President of the United States. The candidate who has received the most votes in Florida was Ralph Nader in 2000.

| Year | Nominee | Votes |
|---|---|---|
| 1996 | Ralph Nader (write in) | 4,101 (0.08%) |
| 2000 | Ralph Nader | 97,488 (1.63%) |
| 2004 | David Cobb | 3,502 (0.05%) |
| 2008 | Cynthia McKinney | 2,887 (0.03%) |
| 2012 | Jill Stein | 8,947 (0.11%) |
| 2016 | Jill Stein | 64,399 (0.68%) |
| 2020 | Howie Hawkins | 14,721 (0.13%) |
| 2024 | Jill Stein | 43,155 (0.40%) |

== See also ==
- Politics of Florida
- Government of Florida
- Elections in Florida
- Political party strength in Florida
- Law of Florida
- List of politics by U.S. state
