= Ecology Party of Florida =

- Chairperson: Cara Campbell
- Treasurer: Gary Hecker
- Founded: 2008; 18 years ago
- Headquarters: Fort Lauderdale, Florida
- Registered voters (2012): 125
- Ideology: Anti-vaccination; Climate change denial Regionalism
- Seats in the Florida Senate: 0 / 40
- Seats in the Florida House of Representatives: 0 / 120

Website
- ecologyparty.org

The Ecology Party of Florida is a minor political party in the United States state of Florida. Founded as a front group to support Ralph Nader's 2008 presidential candidacy, it has remained minimally active in the years since that election.

== History ==
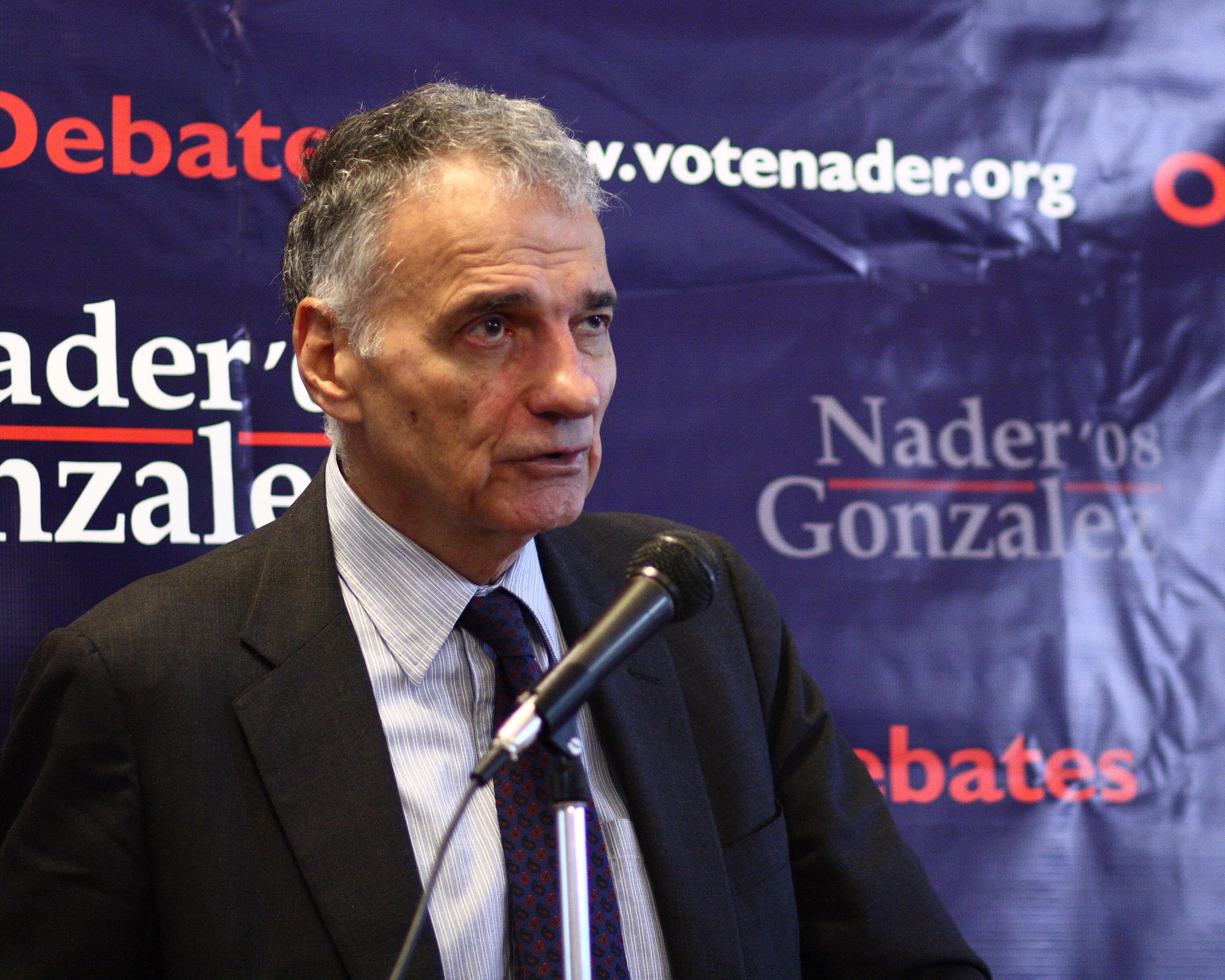
The Ecology Party of Florida was founded as a Ralph Nader front group.

=== Ralph Nader ===
The party, which describes itself as "peacefully revolutionary", was founded by supporters of Ralph Nader in 2008 (under Florida elections law, political parties are recognized upon filing a statement of existence with the Florida Secretary of State naming a chair and a treasurer). The party was formed to give Nader easy access to the Florida ballot line in that year's election; Florida elections law allows any registered political party to place a candidate for president of the United States on the election ballot, but requires unaffiliated candidates (which Ralph Nader was in 2008) to submit a petition signed by 119,316 registered voters. The party nominated Nader for president of the United States in 2008. Nader accepted the nomination and appeared on the ballot in Florida as a candidate of the Ecology Party of Florida, while running in most other states as independent or unaffiliated.

=== After Nader ===
In 2009 the party registered as a co-intervener in an attempt to stop administrative licensing of two proposed nuclear reactors in Levy County, Florida. Contributions from an anonymous donor allowed the party to retain legal representation in support of its efforts.

The party did not nominate a candidate in the 2012 presidential election.

In 2015 the party joined with a number of other groups, including Greenpeace, the Tea Party Network, Sierra Club, and Conservatives for Responsible Stewardship, in pushing a ballot initiative in Florida that, if passed, would permit businesses to produce "up to two megawatts of power a day [sic]" and sell it directly to businesses and residences on adjacent property.
