= Independent Party of Florida =

Political party

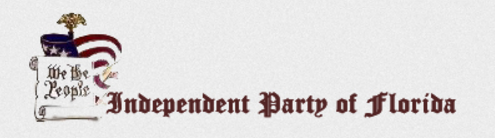
- Chairperson: Ernest Bach
- Treasurer: Sadie Abrams
- Founded: 1993
- Headquarters: Largo, Florida
- Registered voters (2026): ▲315,225
- Ideology: Big tent
- Political position: Center
- Florida Senate: 0 / 40
- Florida House of Representatives: 0 / 120

The Independent Party of Florida (IPF) is a minor political party in the U.S. state of Florida. The IPF is the third largest party in Florida amongst registered voters, behind the Republican and Democratic parties, not counting those who are registered under No Party Affiliation.

== History ==
The Independent Party of Florida was founded in 1993 out of support for Ross Perot's 1992 presidential campaign. Its chair is Ernest Bach, a former Republican from Pinellas County. During the 2016 presidential election, the IPF attempted to nominate Utah conservative, Evan McMullin, who had been running an independent campaign. However, he was denied ballot access; they endorsed Democratic nominee, Hillary Clinton, instead. In the 2020 presidential election, party leaders considered again nominating an independent, this time, Brock Peirce, but opted not to, out of fear of spoiling the election for Joe Biden in favor of Donald Trump. The Independent Party did not endorse any candidate in the 2024 presidential election.

The Independent Party has struggled to maintain its minor party status, lacking resources to maintain a website or social media presence. In 2017, the Florida Election Commission revoked its status as a party on a technicality because its prior audit was not done by a certified public account, as required by Florida law, however, it was reinstated a few months later.

== Naming confusion ==
Many who have registered as voters of the Independent Party of Florida did so falsely believing that they were registering as a voter unaffiliated with a party, contributing to the party's large number of registered voters. In Florida, a voter must register under "No Party Affiliation" (NPA) in order to not be aligned with a specific party. The situation has been compared to an incident in which many independent voters in California accidentally registered with the similarly named American Independent Party. Ernest Bach has denied that their voters registered with the IPF by accident.

The Independent Party of Florida was also often confused with the now-defunct Independence Party of Florida.
