= Endorsements in the 1984 Democratic Party presidential primaries =

This is a list of endorsements for declared candidates in the Democratic primaries for the 1984 United States presidential election.

== Convention Candidates ==
=== Walter Mondale ===
Walter Mondale endorsements

Executive Branch Officials

- Jimmy Carter, former President of the United States from Georgia (1977–1981)
- Dean Rusk, former United States Secretary of State from Georgia (1961–1969)

U.S. Senate

- Lloyd Bentsen, U.S. Senator from Texas (1971–1993)
- Alan J. Dixon, U.S. Senator from Illinois (1981–1993)
- Thomas Eagleton, U.S. Senator from Missouri (1968–1987)
- Daniel Inouye, U.S. Senator from Hawaii (1963–2012)
- Ted Kennedy, U.S. Senator from Massachusetts (1962–2009)
- Frank Lautenberg, U.S. Senator from New Jersey (1982–2001)
- Patrick Leahy, U.S. Senator from Vermont (1975–2023)
- Carl Levin, U.S. Senator from Michigan (1979–2015)
- Howard Metzenbaum, U.S. Senator from Ohio (1976–1995)
- George J. Mitchell, U.S. Senator from Maine (1980–1995)
- Daniel Patrick Moynihan, U.S. Senator from New York (1977–2001)
- Donald Riegle, U.S. Senator from Michigan (1976–1995)
- Paul Sarbanes, U.S. Senator from Maryland (1977–2007)

Former

- George McGovern, U.S. Senator from South Dakota (1963–1981) (previously a candidate for President)

U.S. House of Representatives

- Bill Alexander, member of the U.S. House of Representatives from Arkansas's 1st congressional district (1969–1993)
- Glenn M. Anderson, member of the U.S. House of Representatives from California (1969–1993) (previously endorsed Alan Cranston)
- Michael D. Barnes, member of the U.S. House of Representatives from Maryland's 8th congressional district (1979–1987)
- Jim Bates, member of the U.S. House of Representatives from California's 44th congressional district (1983–1991)
- Berkley Bedell, member of the U.S. House of Representatives from Iowa's 6th congressional district (1975–1987)
- Anthony Beilenson, member of the U.S. House of Representatives from California (1977–1997)
- Edward Boland, member of the U.S. House of Representatives from Massachusetts's 2nd congressional district (1953–1989)
- Douglas H. Bosco, member of the U.S. House of Representatives from California's 1st congressional district (1983–1991)
- Bill Boner, member of the U.S. House of Representatives from Tennessee's 5th congressional district (1979–1987)
- Don Bonker, member of the U.S. House of Representatives from Washington's 3rd congressional district (1975–1989)
- David Bonior, member of the U.S. House of Representatives from Michigan (1977–2003)
- Rick Boucher member of the U.S. House of Representatives from Virginia's 9th congressional district (1983–2011)
- Jack Brooks, member of the U.S. House of Representatives from Texas (1953–1995)
- John Bryant, member of the U.S. House of Representatives from Texas's 5th congressional district (1983–1997)
- Sala Burton, member of the U.S. House of Representatives from California's 5th congressional district (1983–1987) (previously endorsed Alan Cranston)
- Barbara Boxer, member of the U.S. House of Representatives from California's 6th congressional district (1983–1993)
- Bob Carr, member of the U.S. House of Representatives from Michigan (1983–1995)
- Tony Coelho, member of the U.S. House of Representatives from California's 15th congressional district (1979–1989)
- George Crockett Jr., member of the U.S. House of Representatives from Michigan's 13th congressional district (1980–1991)
- Norm Dicks, member of the U.S. House of Representatives from Washington's 6th congressional district (1977–2013)
- John Dingell, member of the U.S. House of Representatives from Michigan (1955–2015)
- Mervyn Dymally, member of the U.S. House of Representatives from California's 31st congressional district (1981–1993)
- Joseph D. Early, member of the U.S. House of Representatives from Massachusetts's 3rd congressional district (1975–1993)
- Don Edwards, member of the U.S. House of Representatives from California (1963–1995) (previously endorsed Alan Cranston)
- Tom Foley, House Majority Whip of the U.S. House of Representatives from Washington's 5th congressional district (1981–1987)
- William D. Ford, member of the U.S. House of Representatives from Michigan (1965–1995)
- Barney Frank, member of the U.S. House of Representatives from Massachusetts's 4th congressional district (1981–2013)
- Robert García member of the U.S. House of Representatives from New York (1978–1990)
- Sam Gejdenson, member of the U.S. House of Representatives from Connecticut's 2nd congressional district (1981–2001)
- Frank J. Guarini, member of the U.S. House of Representatives from New Jersey's 14th congressional district (1979–1993)
- Tony P. Hall, member of the U.S. House of Representatives from Ohio's 3rd congressional district (1979–2002)
- Tom Harkin, member of the U.S. House of Representatives from Iowa's 5th congressional district (1975–1985)
- Cecil Heftel, member of the U.S. House of Representatives from Hawaii's 1st congressional district (1977–1986)
- Dennis Hertel, member of the U.S. House of Representatives from Michigan's 14th congressional district (1981–1991)
- Steny Hoyer, member of the U.S. House of Representatives from Maryland's 5th congressional district (1981–Present)
- Marcy Kaptur, member of the U.S. House of Representatives from Ohio (1983–present) (previously endorsed John Glenn)
- Abraham Kazen, member of the U.S. House of Representatives from Texas's 23rd congressional district (1967–1985)
- Mickey Leland, member of the U.S. House of Representatives from Texas's 18th congressional district (1979–1989)
- Richard H. Lehman, member of the U.S. House of Representatives from California (1983–1995)
- Sander Levin, member of the U.S. House of Representatives from Michigan (1983–2019)
- Mike Lowry, member of the U.S. House of Representatives from Washington's 7th congressional district (1979–1989)
- Barbara B. Kennelly, member of the U.S. House of Representatives from Connecticut's 1st congressional district (1982–1999)
- Dale Kildee, member of the U.S. House of Representatives from Michigan (1977–2013)
- Matthew G. Martínez, member of the U.S. House of Representatives from California (1982–2001) (previously endorsed Alan Cranston)
- Ed Markey, member of the U.S. House of Representatives from Massachusetts (1976–2013)
- Bob Matsui, member of the U.S. House of Representatives from California (1979–2005)
- Barbara Mikulski, member of the U.S. House of Representatives from Maryland's 3rd congressional district (1977–1987)
- George Miller, member of the U.S. House of Representatives from California (1975–2015)
- Parren Mitchell, member of the U.S. House of Representatives from Maryland's 7th congressional district (1971–1987)
- Joe Moakley, member of the U.S. House of Representatives from Massachusetts's 9th congressional district (1973–2001)
- Bruce Morrison, member of the U.S. House of Representatives from Connecticut's 3rd congressional district (1983–1991)
- Jim Oberstar, member of the U.S. House of Representatives from Minnesota's 8th congressional district (1975–2011)
- Dave Obey, member of the U.S. House of Representatives from Wisconsin's 7th congressional district (1969–2011)
- Tip O'Neill, Speaker of the U.S. House of Representatives from Massachusetts (1977–1987)
- Leon Panetta, member of the U.S. House of Representatives from California (1977–1993)
- Tim Penny, member of the U.S. House of Representatives from Minnesota's 1st congressional district (1983–1995)
- Charles B. Rangel, member of the U.S. House of Representatives from New York (1971–2017)
- William R. Ratchford, member of the U.S. House of Representatives from Connecticut's 5th congressional district (1979–1985)
- Dan Rostenkowski, member of the U.S. House of Representatives from Illinois (1959–1995)
- Marty Russo, member of the U.S. House of Representatives from Illinois's 3rd congressional district (1975–1993)
- Martin Olav Sabo, member of the U.S. House of Representatives from Minnesota's 5th congressional district (1979–2007)
- James Michael Shannon, member of the U.S. House of Representatives from Massachusetts's 5th congressional district (1979–1985)
- Gerry Sikorski, member of the U.S. House of Representatives from Minnesota's 6th congressional district (1983–1993)
- Lawrence J. Smith, member of the U.S. House of Representatives from Florida's 16th congressional district (1983–1993)
- Pete Stark, member of the U.S. House of Representatives from California (1973–2013)
- Esteban Torres, member of the U.S. House of Representatives from California's 34th congressional district (1983–1999) (previously endorsed Alan Cranston)
- J. Bob Traxler, member of the U.S. House of Representatives from Michigan's 8th congressional district (1974–1993)
- Bruce Vento, member of the U.S. House of Representatives from Minnesota's 4th congressional district (1977–2000)
- Howard Wolpe, member of the U.S. House of Representatives from Michigan's 3rd congressional district (1979–1993)
- Jim Wright, Majority Leader of the U.S. House of Representatives from Texas's 12th congressional district (1955–1989)

Former

- David R. Bowen, member of the U.S. House of Representatives from Mississippi's 2nd congressional district (1973–1983)

Governors

- Toney Anaya, Governor of New Mexico (1983–1987)
- Cecil Andrus, Governor of Idaho (1971–1977; 1987–1995)
- James J. Blanchard, Governor of Michigan (1983–1991)
- Joseph E. Brennan, Governor of Maine (1979–1987)
- Mario Cuomo, Governor of New York (1983–1994)
- Michael Dukakis, Governor of Massachusetts (1983–1991)
- Tony Earl, Governor of Wisconsin (1983–1987)
- J. Joseph Garrahy, Governor of Rhode Island (1977–1985)
- Edgar Herschler, Governor of Wyoming (1975–1987)
- Harry Hughes, Governor of Maryland (1979–1987)
- Scott M. Matheson, Governor of Utah (1977–1985)
- William A. O'Neill, Governor of Connecticut (1980–1991)
- Rudy Perpich, Governor of Minnesota (1983–1991)
- Jay Rockefeller, Governor of West Virginia (1977–1985)
- Bill Sheffield, Governor of Alaska (1982–1986)
- George Wallace, Governor of Alabama (1983–1987)
- Mark White, Governor of Texas (1982–1987)

Former

- Pat Brown, Governor of California (1959–1967)
- Kenneth M. Curtis, Governor of Maine (1967–1975)

Statewide officials

- Robert Abrams, New York Attorney General (1979–1993)
- J. Edward Caldwell, Connecticut State Comptroller (1974–1991)
- William J. Cole, Mississippi State Treasurer (1980–1988)
- J. Joseph Curran Jr., Lieutenant Governor of Maryland (1983–1987)
- Joseph J. Fauliso, Lieutenant Governor of Connecticut (1980–1991)
- Louis L. Goldstein, Comptroller of Maryland (1959–1998)
- Madeleine Kunin, Lieutenant Governor of Vermont (1979–1983)
- Tom Miller, Attorney General of Iowa (1979–1991; 1995–2023)
- Zell Miller, Lieutenant Governor of Georgia (1975–1991) (previously endorsed Reubin Askew)
- Edwin L. Pittman, Attorney General of Mississippi (1984–1988)
- Stephen H. Sachs, Attorney General of Maryland (1979–1987)
- James Tierney, Attorney General of Maine (1981–1991)

Former

- Evelyn Gandy, Lieutenant Governor of Mississippi (1976–1980)

State legislative leaders

- Donald Avenson, Speaker of the Iowa House of Representatives (1983–1990)
- Lowell Junkins, Majority Leader of the Iowa Senate
- John L. Martin, Speaker of the Iowa House of Representatives (1983–1990)
- Thomas W. McGee, Speaker of the Maine House of Representatives (1975–1994)
- Buddie Newman, Speaker of the Mississippi House of Representatives (1976–1988)
- Carmen A. Orechio, President of the New Jersey Senate (1981–1991) (1982–1986)
- David Roberti, President pro tempore of the California State Senate (1981–1991) (previously endorsed Alan Cranston)
- Michael Roos, Majority Leader of the California State Assembly (previously endorsed Alan Cranston)

State legislators

- Julian Bond, member of the Georgia State Senate (1975–1987)
- Gloria Molina, member of the California State Assembly (1982–1987) (previously endorsed Alan Cranston)
- Earline S. Rogers, member of the Indiana House of Representatives (1982–1990)

Mayors

- Richard Arrington Jr., Mayor of Birmingham, Alabama (1979–1999)
- Tom Bradley, Mayor of Los Angeles, California (1973–1993)
- Raymond Flynn, Mayor of Boston, Massachusetts (1984–1993)
- ~~Thirman L. Milner, Mayor of Hartford, Connecticut (1981–1987)~~ (switched to Jesse Jackson)
- Coleman Young, Mayor of Detroit, Michigan (1974–1994)

Organizations and unions

- AFL–CIO
- Alabama Democratic Conference
- National Education Association
- National Organization for Women

Party officials

- Edward Campbell, former chair of the Iowa Democratic Party
- Donald Fowler, chair of the South Carolina Democratic Party (1971–1980)
- Betty Strong, chair of the Woodbury County Democratic Party
- Bob Slagle, chair of the Texas Democratic Party
- Edward Vrdolyak, chair of the Cook County Democratic Party (1982–1987)

Celebrities, political activists, and political commentators

- Ellen Burstyn, actress
- Betty Friedan, feminist writer and activist
- Robert Klein, comedian, singer and actor
- Alan King, comedian and actor
- Coretta Scott King, author and civil rights leader
- Martin Luther King Sr., pastor
- Paul Newman, actor
- Susan Sarandon, actress
- Robert Vaughn, actor
- Joanne Woodward, actress

=== Gary Hart ===
Gary Hart endorsements

U.S. Senate

- Chris Dodd, U.S. Senator from Connecticut (1981–2011)
- Fritz Hollings, U.S. Senator from South Carolina (1966–2005) (previously a candidate for President)

U.S. House of Representatives

- Andrew Jacobs Jr., member of the U.S. House of Representatives from Indiana (1975–1997)
- Ray Kogovsek, member of the U.S. House of Representatives from Colorado's 3rd congressional district (1979–1985)
- Martin Frost, member of the U.S. House of Representatives from Texas's 24th congressional district (1979–2005)
- Patricia Schroeder, member of the U.S. House of Representatives from Colorado's 1st congressional district (1973–1997)
- Chuck Schumer, member of the U.S. House of Representatives from New York (1981–1999)
- Mo Udall, member of the U.S. House of Representatives from Arizona's 2nd congressional district (1961–1991)
- Henry A. Waxman, member of the U.S. House of Representatives from California (1975–2015) (previously endorsed Alan Cranston)
- Tim Wirth, member of the U.S. House of Representatives from Colorado's 2nd congressional district (1975–1987)

Former

- J. Edward Roush, member of the U.S. House of Representatives from Indiana's 4th congressional district (1971–1977)

Governors

- Bob Kerrey, Governor of Nebraska (1983–1987)
- Richard Lamm, Governor of Colorado (1975–1987)

Statewide officials

- Nancy Dick, Lieutenant Governor of Colorado (1979–1987)
- Lynn Simons, 17th Wyoming Superintendent of Public Instruction (1979–1991)
- Nancy Stevenson, 83rd Lieutenant Governor of South Carolina (1979–1983)

State legislators

- Mike Abrams, member of the Florida House of Representatives (1983–1992)
- Harry Chapman, member of the South Carolina Senate

Former

- Sandy D'Alemberte, member of the Florida House of Representatives (1966–1972)

Local officials

- Roger Watson, member of the Mason, Iowa city council

Party officials

- ~~David Manley, chair of the Cerro Gordo County Democratic Party~~ (switched endorsement to Alan Cranston)
- Shirley Schommer, vice-chair of the Vermont Democratic Party

Celebrities, political activists, and political commentators

- Warren Beatty, actor and director
- Candy Clark, actress and model
- Goldie Hawn, actress
- Don Henley, singer
- Carole King, singer
- John Forsythe, actor
- Hal Linden, actor
- Penny Marshall, actress
- Walter Matthau, actor
- Mary Tyler Moore, actress
- Donna Mills, actress
- Jack Nicholson, actor
- Robert Redford, actor
- Robin Williams, comedian
- Debra Winger, actress

Activists and public figures

- John B. Emerson, lawyer

=== Jesse Jackson ===
Jesse Jackson endorsements

U.S. House of Representatives

- John Conyers, member of the U.S. House of Representatives from Michigan (1965–2017)
- Ron Dellums, member of the U.S. House of Representatives from California (1971–1998)
- Walter E. Fauntroy, delegate in the U.S. House of Representatives from Washington, D.C. (1971–1991)
- Katie Hall, member of the U.S. House of Representatives from Indiana's 1st congressional district (1982–1985)
- Louis Stokes, member of the U.S. House of Representatives from Ohio (1969–1999) (previously endorsed John Glenn)

Former

- Shirley Chisholm, member of the U.S. House of Representatives from New York's 12th congressional district (1969–1983)

Governors

- Orval E. Faubus, former Governor of Arkansas (1955–1967)

State legislators

- Tyrone Brooks, member of the Georgia House of Representatives (1981–2015)
- Michael Figures, member of the Alabama Senate (1978–1996)
- Earl Hilliard Sr., member of the Alabama Senate (1980–1993)
- Henry Sanders, member of the Alabama Senate (1983–2018)

Mayors

- Marion Barry, Mayor of the District of Columbia (1979–1991; 1995–1999)
- Johnny Ford, Mayor of Tuskegee, Alabama
- Richard G. Hatcher, Mayor of Gary, Indiana (1968–1988)
- Thirman L. Milner, Mayor of Hartford, Connecticut (1981–1987) (previously endorsed Walter Mondale)
- Carl Officer, Mayor of East St. Louis, Illinois

Organizations and unions

- Church of God in Christ
- Nation of Islam
- National Baptist Convention of America, Inc.
- National Baptist Convention, USA, Inc.
- National Farmers Alliance
- National Hispanic Leadership Conference

Local officials

- Frank Smith, member of the Council of the District of Columbia (1983–1999)

Celebrities, political activists, and political commentators

- Muhammad Ali
- Harry Belafonte, singer
- Barry Commoner, ecologist
- Bill Cosby, comedian
- Roberta Flack, singer
- Aretha Franklin, singer
- Dick Gregory, comedian, actor and writer
- Tramaine Hawkins, singer
- Jayne Kennedy, actress
- Stevie Wonder, singer

== Withdrawn Candidates ==
=== John Glenn ===
John Glenn endorsements (to March 16, 1984)

U.S. Senators

- Sam Nunn, U.S. Senator from Georgia (1972–1997)
- Jim Sasser, U.S. Senator from Tennessee (1977–1995)
- Paul Tsongas, U.S. Senator from Massachusetts (1979–1985)

U.S. House of Representatives

- Michael A. Andrews, member of the U.S. House of Representatives from Texas's 25th congressional district (1983–1995)
- Douglas Applegate, member of the U.S. House of Representatives from Ohio's 18th congressional district (1977–1995)
- Charles Robin Britt, member of the U.S. House of Representatives from North Carolina's 6th congressional district (1983–1985)
- Brian J. Donnelly, member of the U.S. House of Representatives from Massachusetts's 11th congressional district (1979–1993)
- Roy Dyson, member of the U.S. House of Representatives from Maryland's 1st congressional district (1981–1991)
- Dennis E. Eckart, member of the U.S. House of Representatives from Ohio (1981–1993)
- Ed Feighan, member of the U.S. House of Representatives from Ohio's 19th congressional district (1983–1993)
- Ralph Hall, member of the U.S. House of Representatives from Texas's 4th congressional district (1981–2015)
- Jack Hightower, member of the U.S. House of Representatives from Texas's 13th congressional district (1975–1985)
- Marcy Kaptur, member of the U.S. House of Representatives from Ohio (1983–present) (endorsed Walter Mondale after Glenn withdrew from the race)
- Tom Luken, member of the U.S. House of Representatives from Ohio (1977–1991)
- Nicholas Mavroules, member of the U.S. House of Representatives from Massachusetts's 6th congressional district (1979–1993)
- Dave McCurdy, member of the U.S. House of Representatives from Oklahoma's 4th congressional district (1981–1995)
- Jim Moody, member of the U.S. House of Representatives from Wisconsin's 5th congressional district (1983–1993)
- Mary Rose Oakar, member of the U.S. House of Representatives from Ohio's 20th congressional district (1977–1993)
- Jim Olin, member of the U.S. House of Representatives from Virginia's 6th congressional district (1983–1993)
- Don Pease, member of the U.S. House of Representatives from Ohio's 13th congressional district (1977–1993)
- John F. Seiberling, member of the U.S. House of Representatives from Ohio's 14th congressional district (1971–1987)
- Charles Stenholm, member of the U.S. House of Representatives from Texas's 17th congressional district (1979–2005)
- ~~Louis Stokes, member of the U.S. House of Representatives from Ohio (1969–1999)~~ (switched to Jesse Jackson)
- Billy Tauzin, member of the U.S. House of Representatives from Louisiana's 3rd congressional district (1980–2005)
- Lindsay Thomas, member of the U.S. House of Representatives from Georgia's 1st congressional district (1983–1993)

Governors

- John W. Carlin, Governor of Kansas (1979–1987)
- Dick Celeste, Governor of Ohio (1983–1991)
- Chuck Robb, Governor of Virginia (1982–1986)

Statewide officials

- Bill Baxley, Lieutenant Governor of Alabama (1983–1987)
- Tommy Irvin, Georgia Commissioner of Agriculture (1969–2011)

State legislative leaders

- William Bulger, President of the Massachusetts Senate (1978–1996)
- Daniel J. Foley, Majority Leader of the Massachusetts Senate
- Bob F. Griffin, Speaker of the Missouri House of Representatives (1981–1996)
- John E. Scott, President pro tempore of the Missouri Senate (1983–1988)

State legislators

- Larry Walker, member of the Georgia House of Representatives (1973–2005)

Local officials

- Tom Tully, mayor of Dubuque, Iowa (1978)

Party officials

- Lee Campbell, chair of the Union County Democratic Party
- Pat Gilroy, chair of the Johnson County Democratic Party
- Frank Rasmussen, chair of the Scott County Democratic Party
- Billy Snook, chair of the Wayne County Democratic Party

Celebrities, political activists, and political commentators

- Woody Woodbury, comedian and actor

=== George McGovern ===
George McGovern endorsements (to March 14, 1984)

U.S. Senators

- James Abourezk, former U.S. Senator from South Dakota (1973–1979)

Party officials

- Stan Kading, co-chair of the Adair County Democratic Party
- Judy Wilson, chair of the Polk County Democratic Party

Celebrities, political activists, and political commentators

- Arlo Guthrie, singer

=== Reubin Askew ===
Reubin Askew endorsements (to March 1, 1984)

U.S. Senators

- Lawton Chiles, U.S. Senator from Florida (1971–1989)

U.S. House of Representatives

- Charles E. Bennett, member of the U.S. House of Representatives from Florida (1949–1993)
- Earl Hutto, member of the U.S. House of Representatives from Florida's 1st congressional district (1979–1995)
- Bill Chappell, member of the U.S. House of Representatives from Florida's 4th congressional district (1969–1989)
- Dante Fascell, member of the U.S. House of Representatives from Florida (1955–1993)
- Don Fuqua, member of the U.S. House of Representatives from Florida (1963–1987)
- Sam Gibbons, member of the U.S. House of Representatives from Florida (1963–1997)
- Andy Ireland, member of the U.S. House of Representatives from Florida (1977–1993)
- Buddy MacKay, member of the U.S. House of Representatives from Florida's 6th congressional district (1983–1989)
- Dan Mica, member of the U.S. House of Representatives from Florida (1979–1989)
- Bill Nelson, member of the U.S. House of Representatives from Florida (1979–1991)

Governors

- Bob Graham, 38th Governor of Florida (1979–1987)

State legislative leaders

- Tom Murphy, Speaker of the Georgia House of Representatives (1973–2003)

State legislators

- Arnett Girardeau, member of the Florida Senate (1983–1992)

Statewide officials

- Doyle Conner, Florida Commissioner of Agriculture (1961–1991)
- George Firestone, Secretary of State of Florida (1974–1986)
- Bill Gunter, Treasurer, Insurance Commissioner and Fire Marshal of Florida (1976–1989)
- Gerald Lewis, Florida Comptroller (1975–1995)
- Jesse J. McCrary Jr., Secretary of State of Florida (1978–1979)
- Zell Miller, Lieutenant Governor of Georgia (1975–1991)
- Wayne Mixson, Lieutenant Governor of Florida (1979–1991)
- James C. Smith, Florida Attorney General (1979–1987)
- Ralph Turlington, Florida Education Commissioner (1974–1986)

Mayors

- Bill Frederick, Mayor of Orlando, Florida
- Eva Mack, Mayor of West Palm Beach, Florida

Party officials

- Joseph Tilley, chair of the Greene County Democratic Party

=== Ernest Hollings ===
Ernest Hollings endorsements (to March 1, 1984)

United States Senate

Former

- Birch Bayh, U.S. Senator from Indiana (1963–1981)
- William Spong Jr., U.S. Senator from Virginia (1966–1973)

U.S. House of Representatives

- Butler Derrick, member of the U.S. House of Representatives from South Carolina's 3rd congressional district (1975–1995)
- John Spratt, member of the U.S. House of Representatives from South Carolina's 5th congressional district (1983–2011)
- Robin Tallon, member of the U.S. House of Representatives from South Carolina's 6th congressional district (1983–1993)

Governors

- Richard Riley, Governor of South Carolina (1979–1987)

Former

- Robert Evander McNair, Governor of South Carolina (1965–1971)
- Terry Sanford, Governor of North Carolina (1961–1965)
- John C. West, Governor of South Carolina (1971–1975)

Statewide officials

- Martha Griffiths, Lieutenant Governor of Michigan (1983–1991)
- Nancy Stevenson, Lieutenant Governor of South Carolina

State legislators

- Anna Belle Clement O'Brien, member of the Tennessee State Senate (1977–1996)

Party officials

- William Jennings Bryan Dorn, chair of the South Carolina Democratic Party (1980–1984)

Celebrities, political activists, and political commentators

- Ruth Warrick, singer and actress

=== Alan Cranston ===
Alan Cranston endorsements (to February 29, 1984)

U.S. House of Representatives

- Glenn M. Anderson, member of the U.S. House of Representatives from California (1969–1993)
- Howard Berman, member of the U.S. House of Representatives from California (1983–2013)
- George Brown Jr., member of the U.S. House of Representatives from California (1963–1971; 1973–1999)
- Sala Burton, member of the U.S. House of Representatives from California's 5th congressional district (1983–1987)
- Don Edwards, member of the U.S. House of Representatives from California (1963–1995)
- William Lehman, member of the U.S. House of Representatives from Florida (1973–1993)
- Mel Levine, member of the U.S. House of Representatives from California's 27th congressional district (1983–1993)
- Matthew G. Martínez, member of the U.S. House of Representatives from California (1982–2001)
- Esteban Torres, member of the U.S. House of Representatives from California's 34th congressional district (1983–1999)
- Henry Waxman, member of the U.S. House of Representatives from California (1975–2015)

Governors

- Jerry Brown, former Governor of California (1975–1983)

State legislative leaders

- Willie Brown, Speaker of the California State Assembly (1980–1995)
- David Roberti, President pro tempore of the California State Senate (1980–1991)
- ~~Michael Roos, Majority Leader of the California State Assembly~~ (switched to Walter Mondale)

State legislators

- Jack Gordon, member of the Florida Senate

State legislators

- Julian Bond, member of the Georgia State Senate (1975–1987)
- ~~Gloria Molina, member of the California State Assembly (1982–1987)~~ (switched to Walter Mondale)

Statewide officials

- Jesse M. Unruh, California State Treasurer (1975–1987)

Party officials

- David Manley, chair of the Cerro Gordo County Democratic Party (previously endorsed Gary Hart)

Business executives and leaders

- Sheldon Adelson, CEO of Las Vegas Sands

Celebrities, political activists, and political commentators

- Margie Adam, singer
- Ed Asner, actor
- Ed Begley Jr., actor
- Lloyd Bridges, actor
- Cesar Chavez, President of United Farm Workers
- Jane Fonda, actress
- Louis Gossett Jr., actor
- Jason Robards, actor
- Martin Sheen, actor

== Others ==
=== Uncommitted ===
Uncommitted endorsements

U.S. House of Representatives

- Daniel Akaka, member of the U.S. House of Representatives from Hawaii's 2nd congressional district (1977–1990)

Governors

- George Ariyoshi, Governor of Hawaii (1973–1986)

Mayors

- Eileen Anderson, Mayor of Honolulu (1981–1985)

=== No Endorsement ===
No endorsements

Governors

- William Allain, Governor of Mississippi (1984–1988)
- Bruce Babbitt, Governor of Arizona (1978–1987)
- Joe Frank Harris, Governor of Georgia (1983–1991)
- George Nigh, Governor of Oklahoma (1979–1987)
