= Dorothy Glisson =

American politician

Dorothy W. Glisson
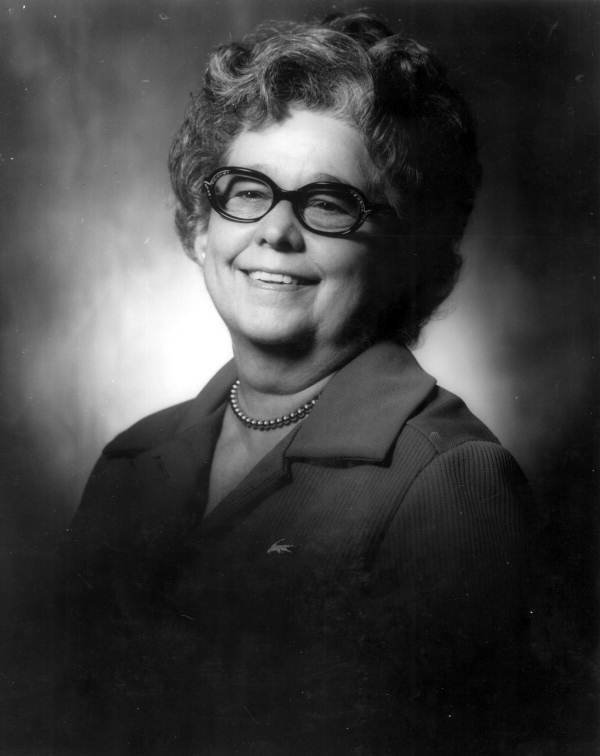

17th Secretary of State of Florida
- In office July 8, 1974 – January 7, 1975
- Governor: Reubin Askew
- Preceded by: Richard Stone
- Succeeded by: Bruce Smathers

Personal details
- Born: 1912 New York, US
- Died: April 10, 2001 (aged 88–89) Tallahassee, Florida, US

Dorothy Watson Glisson (May 10, 1912 – April 10, 2001) was the 17th Secretary of State of Florida, serving for six months from 1974 to 1975. She was the first woman to hold a Florida Cabinet post.

Glisson began working in the state elections office in 1951, and became head of the office in 1954. She served in that role for 20 years until July 1974, when Governor Reubin Askew appointed her to fill out the term of Secretary of State Richard Stone. Stone had resigned to focus on campaigning for the U.S. Senate.

Glisson did not intend to run for election in 1974, but rather complete the sixth months remaining in Stone's unexpired term. After her elected successor Bruce Smathers was inaugurated in January 1975, Glisson returned to her previous position as director of the Division of Elections. In January 1976, Askew appointed her secretary of the Department of Professional and Occupational Regulation. She served in that role until July 1978, when she returned to the Department of State as an assistant secretary under Jesse McCrary. In September 1979, she was again appointed director of the Division of Elections, working in that post under George Firestone for more than seven years until her retirement in February 1987.
