= R. Earl Dixon =

American politician (1927–2016)

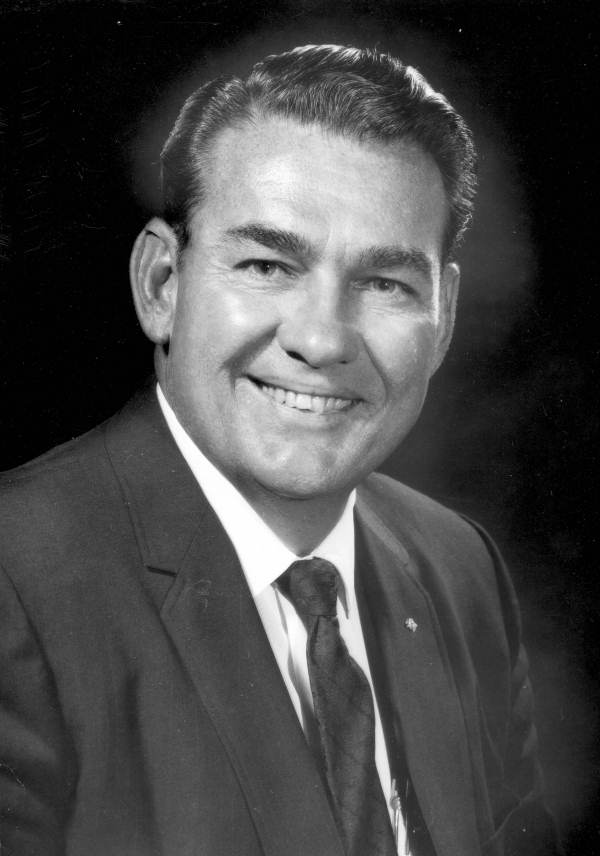
- Dixon in 1968

Member of the Florida House of Representatives from the 25th district
- In office 1968–1972
- Preceded by: Gifford Grange
- Succeeded by: Frank Williams

Member of the Florida House of Representatives from the 23rd district
- In office 1972–1978
- Preceded by: John R. Forbes
- Succeeded by: Fred Tygart

Personal details
- Born: Robert Earl Dixon; March 11, 1927 Bronson, Florida, U.S.
- Died: March 16, 2016 (aged 89)
- Party: Republican; Democratic
- Spouse: Louise W. Dixon
- Education: University of Florida

Robert Earl Dixon (March 11, 1927 – March 16, 2016) was an American politician. He served as a member for the 23rd and 25th district of the Florida House of Representatives.

== Life and career ==
Dixon was born in Bronson, Florida. He attended the University of Florida entomology department.

In 1968, Dixon was elected to represent the 25th district of the Florida House of Representatives, succeeding Gifford Grange. He served until 1972, when he was succeeded by Frank Williams. In the same year, he was elected to represent the 23rd district, succeeding John R. Forbes. He served until 1978, when he was succeeded by Fred Tygart.

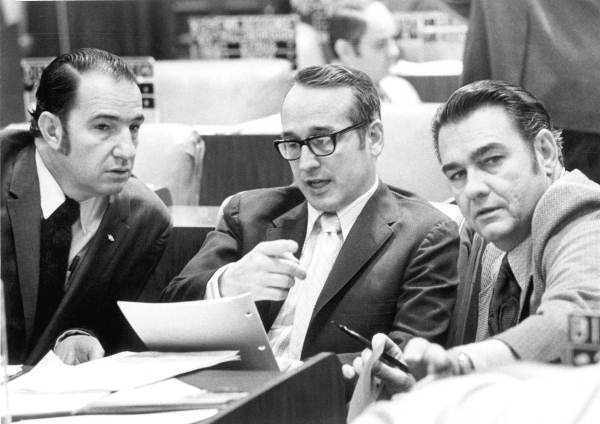
Dixon (right) with Ted Alvarez Jr. and John L. Coney, 1972

Dixon died in March 2016, at the age of 89.
