= John L. Coney =

American politician

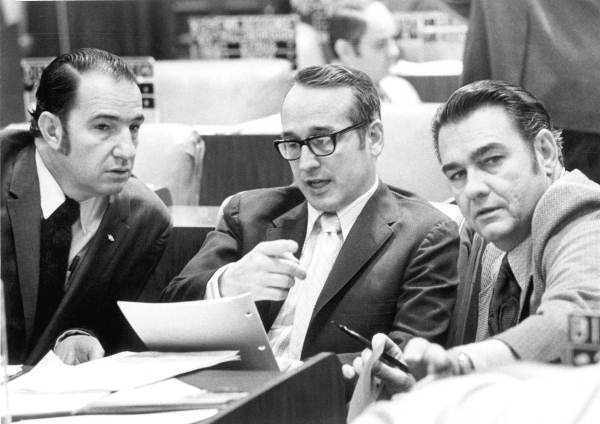
- Coney (center) with Ted Alvarez Jr. and R. Earl Dixon, 1972

Member of the Georgia House of Representatives
- In office 1971–1972

Personal details
- Born: August 9, 1933 Muskogee County, Oklahoma, U.S.
- Died: May 26, 1992 (aged 58)
- Party: Democratic
- Education: Emory University; Lamar School of Law

John L. Coney (August 9, 1933 – May 26, 1992) was an American politician. He served as a Democratic member of the Georgia House of Representatives.

== Life and career ==
Coney was born in Muskogee County, Oklahoma. He attended Bass High School, Emory University and Lamar School of Law.

Coney was an attorney.

Coney served in the Georgia House of Representatives, representing Douglas County from 1971 to 1972.

Coney died on May 26, 1992, at the age of 58.
