= Supervisor of elections =

Head of elections in counties of Florida

The county supervisor of elections (SOE) is a Florida constitutional officer and countywide elected official.

Each county Supervisor of Elections Office, headed by the supervisor, oversees all public elections and political campaign regulations in the county on behalf of the secretary of state of Florida and the Florida Department of State through the Florida Division of Elections. The supervisor is elected every four years, coinciding with presidential elections, by the voters of the county in partisan elections. In the event of the death, resignation, or removal from office of a supervisor of elections, the governor of Florida is empowered to fill the vacancy until the next regularly scheduled election.

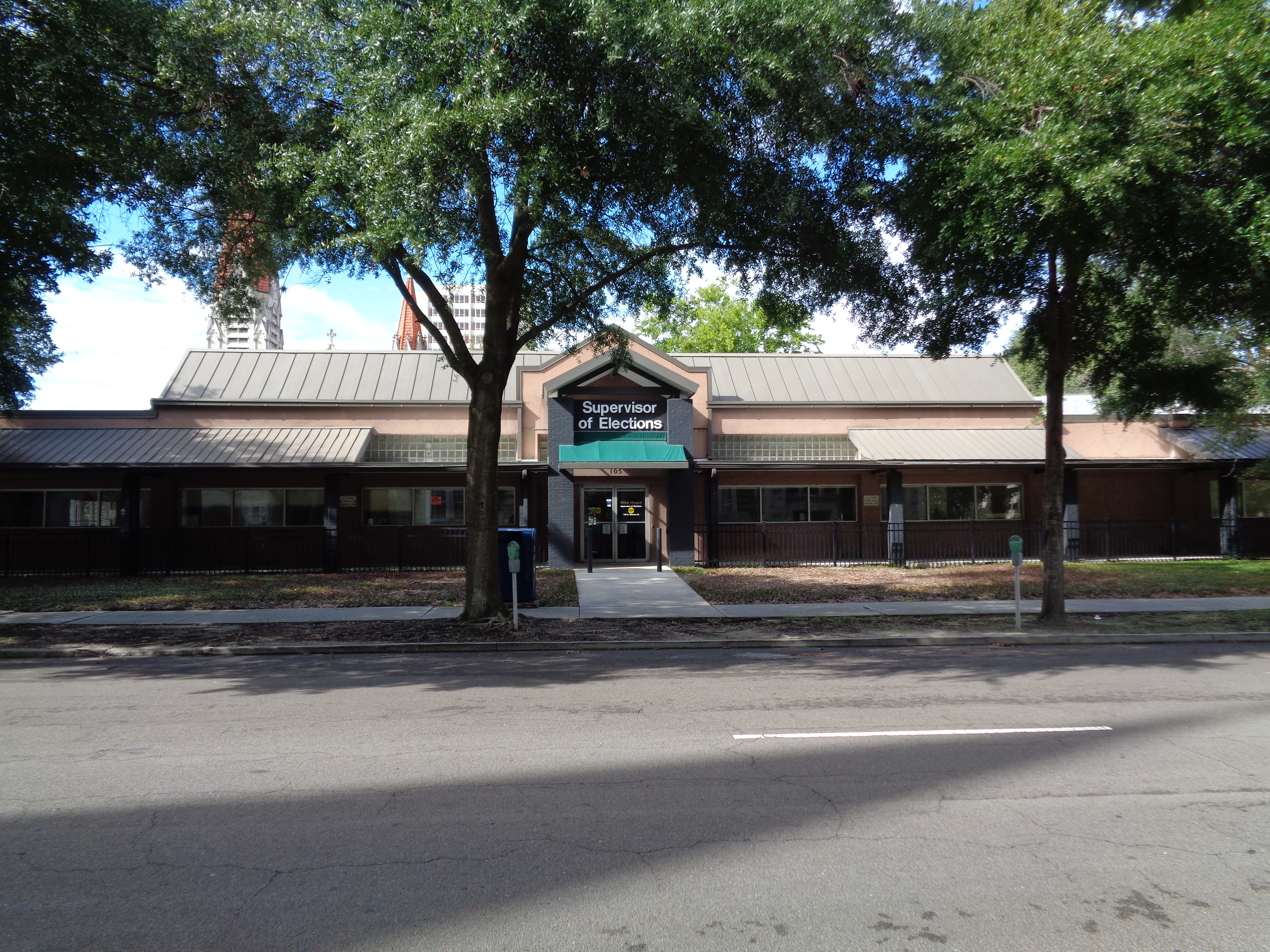
Duval County SOE Office

The role of SOE gained national attention during the 2000 United States presidential election recount in Florida and the Volusia error incident. In 2007, some county supervisors complained their special elections were underfunded.

== Duties and responsibilities ==
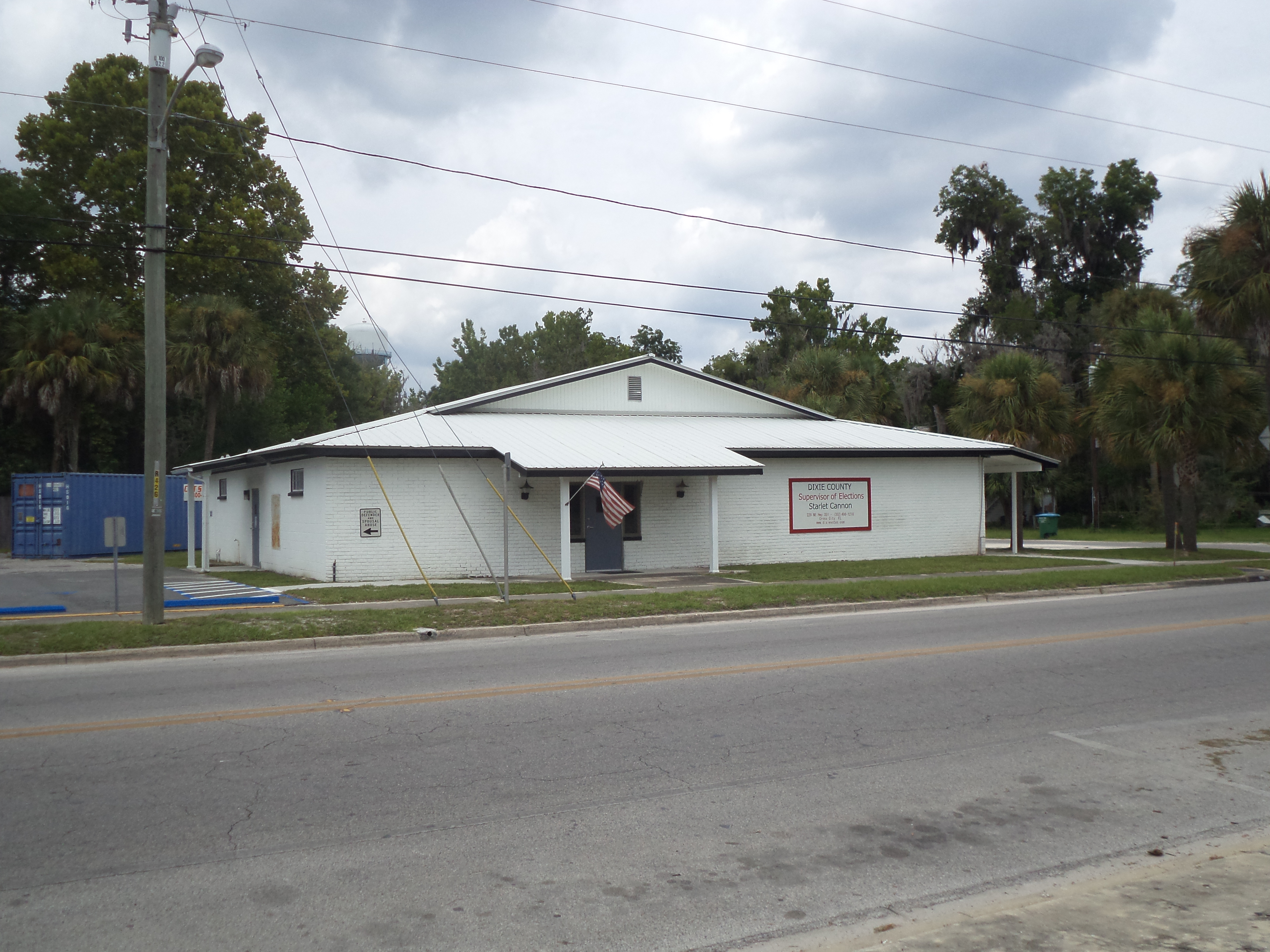
Dixie County SOE Office

The duties, as enumerated in the Florida Statutes, include:

- Conduct all public elections in the county
- Register voters and issue voter information cards
- Remove voters from the registered voter rolls who no longer live in Florida, are deceased, or for any other reason are no longer eligible to vote in Florida
- Change information on registered voter rolls when a change request is received (e.g., name, address, party affiliation)
- Send advance notice of election to voters who are overseas, in the military, or who request notification
- Accept mail ballot requests and send, receive and verify mail ballots
- Qualify candidates for county offices
- Receive candidate campaign finance reports for county offices and make them available to the public
- Receive financial disclosure reports from elected county officials and make them available to the public
- Maintain election equipment
- Hire and train poll workers
- Acquire and equip polling places
- Maintain statistics on election results, voting history and voter registration
- Verify petition signatures for initiative petitions and candidate qualifying petitions
- Maintain precinct information, including a listing of streets and parts of streets that are in each precinct

== List of Florida supervisors of elections ==
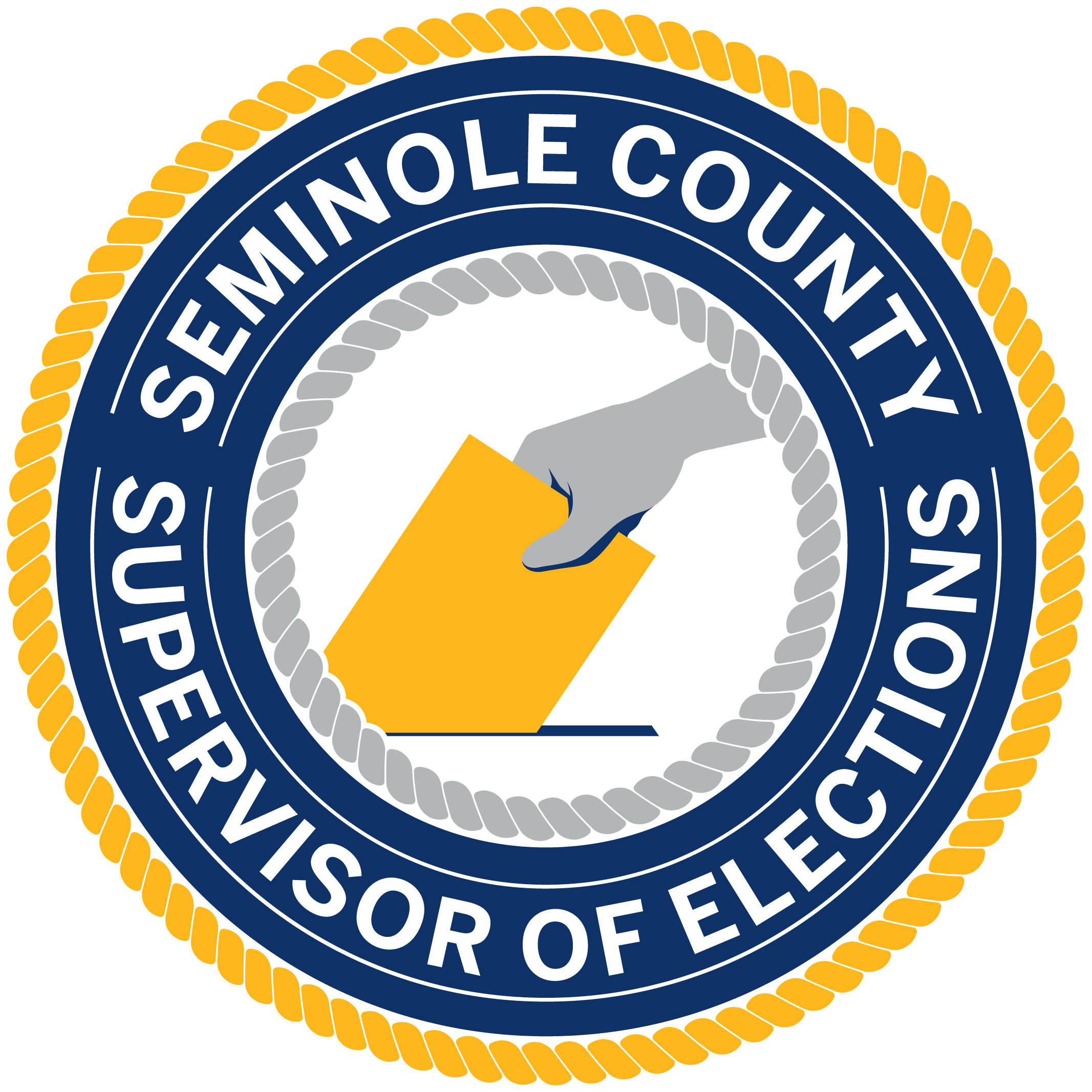
Seminole County SOE logo

The following is a partial list, from Florida's 67 counties, of incumbent (bolded) and former Florida supervisors of elections. A full list of current supervisors by county is maintained by the Florida Division of Elections as well as Florida Supervisors of Elections, Inc., a professional membership organization founded in 1964 to help coordinate continuing education election procedures, legal requirements and evolving voting technology for state elections supervisors.

Current and former Florida supervisors
Name	County
**Janet Adkins** (since 2021)	Nassau County
Chris Anderson (2019–2024)	Seminole County
**Melony Bell** (since 2025)	Polk County
Mike Bennett (2012–2024)	Manatee County
Kurt S. Browning (1980–2006)	Pasco County
Susan Bucher (2009–2019)	Palm Beach County
**Brian E. Corley** (since 2007)	Pasco County
**Karen Castor Dentel** (since 2025)	Orange County
**Mark Earley** (since 2017)	Leon County
Lori Edwards (2000–2025)	Polk County
Mike Ertel (2005–2019)	Seminole County
**Scott Farrington** (since 2025)	Manatee County
**Alina Garcia** (since 2025)	Miami-Dade County
**Alan Hays** (since 2017)	Lake County
**Jerry Holland** (2006–2015 & since 2024)	Duval County
Mike Hogan (2015–2023)	Duval County
Pam Iorio (1993–2003)	Hillsborough County
**Craig Latimer** (since 2013)	Hillsborough County
Theresa LePore (1996–2005)	Palm Beach County
**Amy Pennock** (since 2025)	Seminole County
Ion Sancho (1988–2017)	Leon County
**Wendy Sartory Link** (since 2019)	Palm Beach County
James Satcher (2024–2025)	Manatee County
**Joe Scott** (since 2020)	Broward County
Jim Sebesta (1970–1974)	Hillsborough County
Brenda Snipes (2003–2019)	Broward County
Christina White (2015–2025)	Miami-Dade County

== See also ==
- County sheriff (Florida)
- Government of Florida
- Elections in Florida
- Politics of Florida
