= Blitchton =

Blitchton may refer to:

- Blitchton, Florida
- Blitchton, Georgia
