= Senator Smathers (disambiguation) =

George Smathers (1913–2007) was a U.S. Senator from Florida from 1951 to 1969. Senator Smathers may also refer to:

- Bruce Smathers (born 1943), member of the Florida State Senate from 1972 to 1974
- William H. Smathers (1891–1955), U.S. Senator from New Jersey from 1937 to 1943
