= Howard Academy =

Coordinates: 29°11′21″N 82°8′43″W

Howard Academy, at 306 NW 7th Avenue in Ocala, Florida, was a school for African-American children opened in 1866 or 1867 by the Freedmen's Bureau. Up until that time there had been no public and almost no private education for African Americans in Florida; education for slaves was prohibited by law (see Anti-literacy laws in the United States) and free blacks were made to feel unwelcome and encouraged to leave the state.

== History ==
James H. Howard, a former slave owner, donated land on the corner of Osceola and Third streets. Financial support and the teachers came from the North. "By 1880, Howard Academy was run by African American teachers." [We] were the beneficiaries of very well-educated, very dedicated, and very strong teachers [who couldn't get jobs elsewhere]". Howard got hand-me-down textbooks from Ocala High.

For many years, Howard Academy was one of the outstanding black schools in the state. "The emphasis at Howard High School was on academics.... "They used what I call the Greco-Roman model; you succeed academically, and you succeed athletically"....

Howard Academy was destroyed by fire in 1887 and a new school was built a year later at the corner of Adams and Bay, now Northwest Second Street and Northwest Seventh Avenue. Howard became a high school in 1927. It was one of two schools in the state of Florida that awarded high school diplomas to African-Americans. (The other was Lincoln High School, in Tallahassee.) In 1935, the building was badly damaged by fire and had to be torn down. A new brick building was built a year later, near the site of the old building.

Principal Edward Daniel Davis was firest because of his leadership in the Florida State Teachers Association and its campaign for equal pay for black teachers.

The high school at Howard Academy closed in 1955 when the students were moved to Howard High School, which is now Howard Middle School. That was still more than 10 years before county schools were integrated. The school building is currently the Howard Academy Community Center, and houses the Black History Museum of Marion County.

== Notable alumni ==
- H. W. Chandler, elected state senator in 1880.
- Dr. Ollie Gary Christian.
- Dr. Faye Gary, Professor of Nursing, holds [2015] an endowed chair at Case Western Reserve University.
- Loretta Pompey Jenkins, elementary school principal and President of the Marion County branch of the NAACP.
- Jesse McCrary, Florida's first African-American Secretary of State
- Dr. Effie Carrie Mitchell Hampton, the first African-American woman to become a doctor in Florida, She was married to another doctor and Howard graduate, Dr. Hampton. She operated a pharmacy.
- Dr. Lee Royal Hampton, the first black dentist in Ocala.
- Dr. Benita June Gary Hopps, Dean and Professor Emeritus, Boston College Graduate School of Social Work

== See also ==
- Fessenden Elementary School
