= Mike Ertel =

American politician

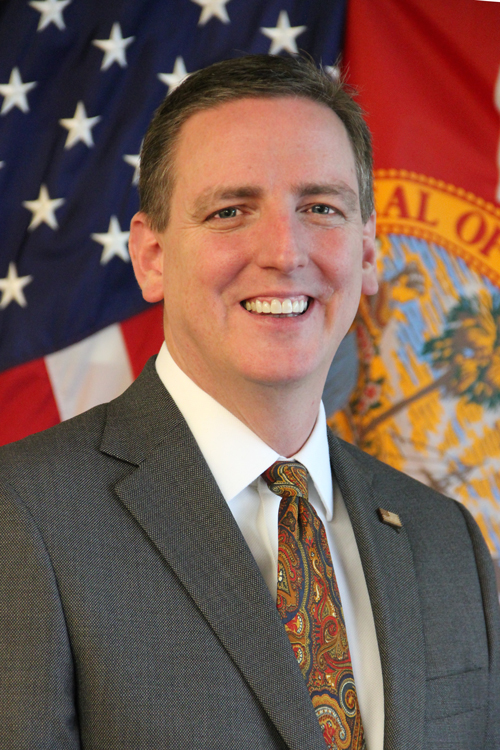

34th Secretary of State of Florida
- In office January 8, 2019 – January 24, 2019
- Governor: Ron DeSantis
- Preceded by: Ken Detzner
- Succeeded by: Jennifer Kennedy (interim)

Seminole County Supervisor of Elections
- In office February 8, 2005 – January 8, 2019
- Appointed by: Jeb Bush
- Preceded by: Dennis Joyner
- Succeeded by: Chris Anderson

Personal details
- Born: November 29, 1969 (age 56) Jacksonville, Florida, U.S.
- Party: Republican
- Spouse: Michelle Ertel
- Children: 2
- Education: University of Maryland, University College (BA); Rollins College (MBA)

Michael Ertel (born November 29, 1969) is an American politician who briefly served as the 29th Secretary of State of Florida. A Republican, Ertel previously served as Supervisor of Elections for Seminole County, Florida, a position which he was first appointed to by Governor Jeb Bush in February 2005. Ertel resigned as Secretary of State after less than a month in office after photos of Ertel dressed in blackface surfaced.

== Early life and education ==
Ertel was born in Jacksonville, and grew up in Seminole County. After graduating from Lake Howell High School, Ertel earned a Bachelor of Arts degree from the University of Maryland University College. Ertel completed a "mini-MBA" program at Rollins College.

=== Military service ===
Ertel served in the United States Army, first in the Infantry and then as a public affairs representative, and took part in Army operations during the 1992 Los Angeles riots; during Operation Able Sentry, in which the United States established a base in Macedonia to monitor sanctions against Serbia; and in Bosnia during the Bosnian War. In the Army, he earned the Meritorious Service Madal, Army Commendation Medal (w/olcand the Army Achievement Medal (w/2olc), among other honors. Ertel undertook training at the Defense Information School.

== Career ==
Ertel returned to Seminole County, where he continued his work in public affairs. After a trio of hurricanes hit Florida in 2004, he was contracted to conduct post-disaster media relations for Visit Florida, which was closely affiliated with the Florida Commission on Tourism.

When longtime Seminole County Supervisor of Elections Sandy Goard resigned from her office in 2003, Dennis Joyner was appointed as her replacement. However, in 2005 Joyner announced his resignation as Supervisor of Elections in a letter to then-Governor Jeb Bush, noting, "My physicians have advised that I [resign] immediately," which was effective on January 10. Ertel, along with a number of other individuals, applied for the appointment to fill Joyner's position, and he was appointed by Governor Bush to serve a two-year term until the next general election.

In 2006, Ertel ran for re-election against Democratic activist Marian Williams, who had run two years prior. He was endorsed by the Orlando Sentinel, which praised him for the fact that he "has run elections well and has taken creative approaches to voter registration and streamlining of office operations." In the end, Ertel defeated Williams by a solid margin, winning 59% of the vote. In 2008, 2012 and 2016, Ertel was re-elected without opposition. In 2012, when Governor Rick Scott purged thousands of voters that he claimed to be non-citizens from the voter rolls, Ertel spoke out, noting that since there were so many instances in which the purged voters were actually legally eligible voters, "[T]he list [of purged voters] should have been vetted quite a bit more before they were given to us." In 2013, Ertel received the International Electoral Ergonomy Award from the International Centre for Parliamentary Studies for his work as the Seminole County Supervisor of Elections; specifically, they praised him for the fact that the Voter Trust Plan he implemented increased voter confidence, increased turnout, and was "exemplary for election management bodies worldwide."

=== Secretary of State ===
On December 28, 2018, Ertel was named by Governor-elect Ron DeSantis to be the next Secretary of State of Florida. However, when photos of Ertel dressed in blackface at a Halloween party in 2005 were leaked by the Tallahassee Democrat on the morning of January 24, 2019, he resigned on the same day.

=== Podcast Host ===
On Halloween Day, 2025, Ertel announced he would be starting a podcast focusing on those who have overcome self-inflicted scars to their careers and reputations. Debuting in 2026, the podcast, titled Bearing Scars, hosted its first guest, Nobel Peace Prize nominee Desmond Meade. Meade discussed his journey from homeless drug addict to being one of Time Magazine's 100 Most Influential People in the World. Other guests have included former professional wrestlers, actors, military and business leaders, and every day citizens who have made self-admitted mistakes in life, but overcome.

Political offices
Preceded by Dennis Joyner	Seminole County Supervisor of Elections; 2005–2019	Chris Anderson
Preceded by Ken Detzner	Secretary of State of Florida; 2019	Succeeded by Laurel Lee
