= Ken Detzner =

28th Secretary of State of Florida

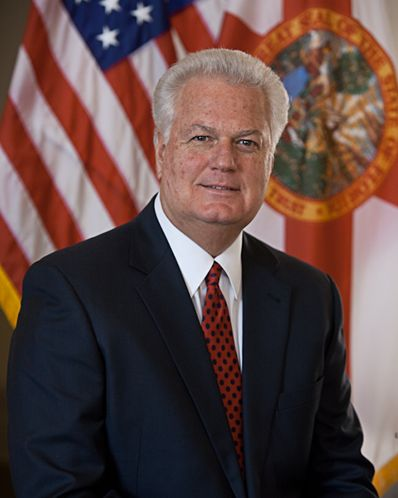

33rd Secretary of State of Florida
- In office February 17, 2012 – January 8, 2019
- Governor: Rick Scott
- Preceded by: Kurt S. Browning
- Succeeded by: Mike Ertel
- In office Acting: January 7, 2003 – February 26, 2003
- Governor: Jeb Bush
- Preceded by: James C. Smith
- Succeeded by: Glenda Hood

Personal details
- Born: September 18, 1952 (age 74) Chicago, Illinois, U.S
- Party: Democratic (before 1984); Republican (1984–present)
- Education: Florida State University (BA)
- Website: Government website

Kenneth W. Detzner (born September 18, 1952) is an American politician who served as the 28th Secretary of State of Florida from 2012 to 2019. A member of the Republican Party, he previously held the office in 2003 in an acting capacity.

== Career ==
=== Early years ===
Detzner graduated from Florida State University in 1975. He was a registered Democrat until 1984 when he changed his registration to Republican. He worked as a lobbyist for the Florida Beer Wholesalers Association. He served as chief of staff to James C. Smith, then the Secretary of State of Florida, from 2002 to 2003.

=== Secretary of State of Florida ===
After the 2002 election, Governor of Florida Jeb Bush appointed Detzner as interim Secretary of State, prior to the swearing-in of Glenda Hood.

In January 2012, Florida Secretary of State Kurt S. Browning announced his resignation to run for School Superintendent of Pasco County. Rick Scott, the Governor of Florida, appointed Detzner to the position to succeed him on January 18, 2012, and he was confirmed by the Florida Senate in late February.

As Florida Secretary of State, Detzner has been accused of continuing a "voter purge" begun by Browning. The United States Department of Justice asked the state to suspend the practice of removing possible ineligible voters from voters lists. Detzner called for machine recounts in the 2018 U.S. Senate election and 2018 gubernatorial election. He called for manual recounts in the U.S. Senate race on November 15, 2018.

Political offices
Preceded by Jim Smith	Secretary of State of Florida; Acting; 2003	Succeeded by Glenda Hood
Preceded by Kurt Browning	Secretary of State of Florida; 2012–2019	Succeeded by Mike Ertel
