= Henry Clay Crawford =

American politician

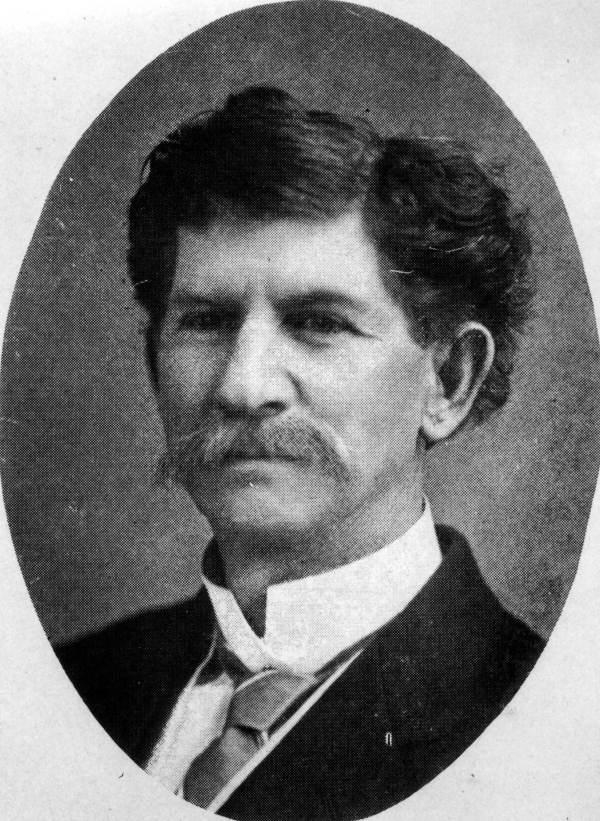

Henry Clay Crawford (1856 – September 23, 1929) served as Secretary of State of Florida from 1902 to 1929, succeeding his father John Lovic Crawford, who served from 1881 to 1902, upon his death. He was a Democrat. H. Clay Crawford held several jobs before becoming chief clerk to his father. Appointed Secretary on January 28, 1902, after his father's death, he was afterwards nominated and reelected until his own death.

He wrote his memoirs in 1914, mainly about the founding of Crawfordville, Florida (the county seat of Wakulla County) and the post-Civil War Reconstruction in the county.

According to the State Archives of Florida, "Crawford claimed that the town was named in 1866 in honor of his father who was then the state senator for Wakulla. He recounts the names and activities of the earliest of Crawfordville's inhabitants and names those who have died and those who remain. His depiction of Reconstruction politics is told from the point of view of a southern Democrat and accuses the Republicans of malfeasance in office. He recounts a riot taking place at the courthouse and the assassination of one of the Republican ringleaders. This is a short work and it seems that it may perhaps have been prepared for publication in a newspaper of the era."

From 1905 to 1909, he was Florida Secretary of state as part of Napoleon B. Broward cabinet.

Legal offices
Preceded by John Lovic Crawford	Secretary of State of Florida; 1902–1929	Succeeded by William Monroe Igou
