= Lynwood Arnold =

American politician (1916–2001)

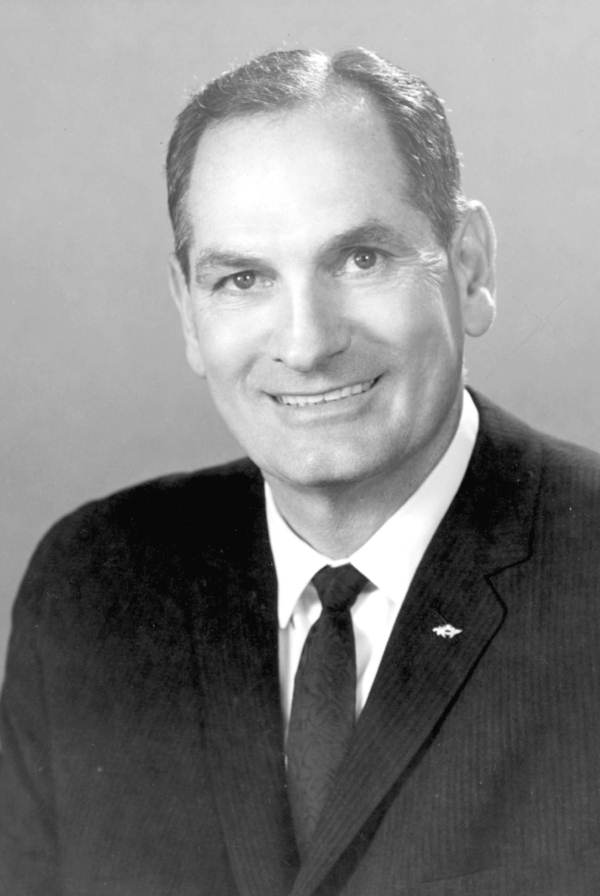
- Arnold in 1963

Member of the Florida Senate from the 9th district
- In office November 3, 1970 – November 7, 1972
- Preceded by: Tom Slade Jr.
- Succeeded by: Bruce Smathers

Member of the Florida House of Representatives
- In office 1963–1970
- Succeeded by: John R. Forbes
- Constituency: Duval County (1963–1967); 23rd district (1967–1970)

Personal details
- Born: October 6, 1916 Jacksonville, Florida, U.S.
- Died: July 11, 2001 (aged 84) Brooksville, Florida, U.S.
- Party: Democratic
- Education: Stetson University

Lynwood Arnold (October 6, 1916 – July 11, 2001) was an American politician. He served as a Democratic member for the 23rd district of the Florida House of Representatives. He also served as a member for the 9th district of the Florida Senate.

== Life and career ==
Arnold was born in Jacksonville, Florida. He attended Stetson University and served in the United States Navy.

In 1963, Arnold was elected to the Florida House of Representatives. In 1967, he was elected as the first representative for the newly-established 23rd district. He served until 1970, when he was succeeded by John R. Forbes. In the same year, he was elected to represent the 9th district of the Florida Senate, serving until 1972.

Arnold died in July 2001 in Brooksville, Florida, at the age of 84.
