= Robert Shevin =

American politician

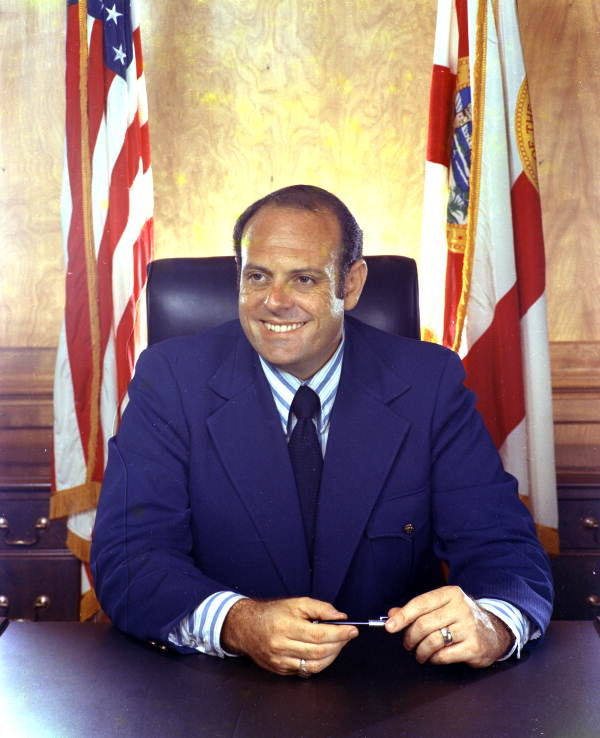

31st Attorney General of Florida
- In office January 5, 1971 – January 2, 1979
- Governor: Reubin Askew
- Preceded by: Earl Faircloth
- Succeeded by: James C. Smith

Judge of the Florida Third District Court of Appeal
- In office 1996–2005
- Nominated by: Lawton Chiles

Personal details
- Born: January 19, 1934 Miami, Florida, U.S.
- Died: July 11, 2005 (aged 71) Miami, Florida, U.S.
- Party: Democratic
- Education: University of Florida (BA); University of Miami (JD)
- Profession: Lawyer

Robert L. Shevin (January 19, 1934 – July 11, 2005) was the Florida Attorney General from 1971 until 1979 and a judge on the Florida Third District Court of Appeal.

== Background ==
Robert Shevin was born in Miami, Florida. He received his bachelor's degree from the University of Florida in 1955, and his Juris Doctor from the University of Miami in 1957. He also attended New York University School of Law.

Shevin was elected to the Florida House of Representatives in 1964 and the Florida State Senate in 1966. He was elected Attorney General in 1970 and re-elected in 1974. Shevin was an unsuccessful candidate for Governor of Florida in 1978. He led the first round of the Democratic Primary, but was defeated in the runoff by Bob Graham.

== Florida legislature ==
Shevin served in the Florida House of Representatives from 1964 to 1966 and the Florida Senate from 1966 to 1970.

== Judicial service ==
Shevin served as a judge for the Florida Third District Court of Appeal from 1996 to 2005. He was appointed by Governor Lawton Chiles.

== See also ==
- List of Jewish American jurists

Party political offices
Preceded by Earl Faircloth	Democratic nominee for Attorney General of Florida; 1970, 1974	Succeeded by James C. Smith
Legal offices
Preceded by Earl Faircloth	Attorney General of Florida; 1971–1979	Succeeded by James C. Smith
