= Fessenden Elementary School =

- Old Fessenden Academy Historic District
- U.S. National Register of Historic Places
- U.S. Historic district
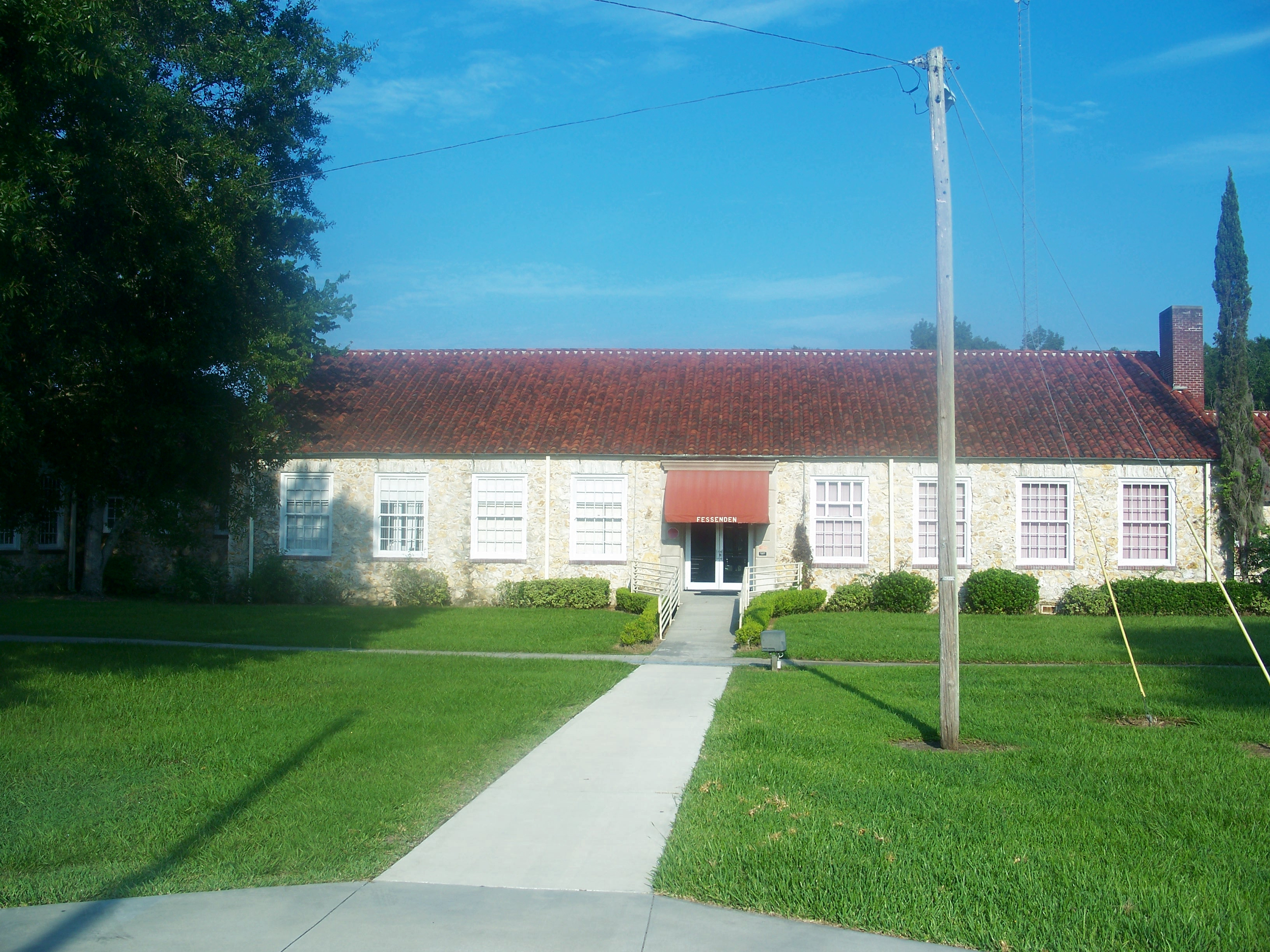

- Location within Florida Location within the United States
- Location: 4200 NW 89th Place, Ocala, Florida
- Coordinates: 29°16′50.4″N 82°11′28.4″W
- Area: 150 acres (0.61 km^{2})
- NRHP reference No.: 94001141
- Added to NRHP: September 29, 1994

The Fessenden Elementary School, a historic school previously known as Fessenden Academy, was founded in 1868 on the outskirts of Ocala, Florida, between Martin and Zuber. Since the 1950s, it has been part of the Marion County Public Schools district. When Fessenden was founded as a private academy for newly freed African-American students, there were no public schools for black students due to Jim Crow laws.

On September 29, 1994, it was listed on the National Register of Historic Places as the Old Fessenden Academy Historic District. The district covers 150 acres (0.61 km^{2}) and has three buildings and one structure.

== History ==
In 1868, the school that would become Fessenden Academy was founded by a group of freedmen led by Thomas B. Ward. The school was initially staffed by young, educated white women from the northeast and Florida. The first African-American teacher was appointed in 1877.

Noticing the condition of the school in 1890, Ferdinand S. Fessenden agreed to build a two-story building and provide desks and learning materials. It is built of coquina rock. In 1892 Fessenden deeded the school, under the auspices of the American Missionary Association of the Congregational Church.

The school grounds have a memorial stone to F. S. Fessenden. His grave is believed to have been marked by this memorial. The main building was built in 1909 with funding from philanthropist Andrew Carnegie. Joseph L. Wiley, principal of Fessenden, secured this $6,500 grant. This funding, plus $1,500 raised in donations, was used for the main building: it included the library, accommodations for female boarders, a dining hall, and more classrooms.

In 1951 Fessenden Academy ceased independent operations. It was absorbed into the public Marion County School System.

== Alumni ==
- Ruby McCollum of Live Oak, Florida
- Frederick Giordani of Ocala, Florida

== Archival material ==
- Records of the Fessenden Academy, 1911–1964, are held in the American Missionary Association archives, Amistad Research Center, Tulane University. They consist of 37 boxes of individual student files, budgets, and school publications.

== See also ==
- Howard Academy
