= John L. Crawford =

American politician

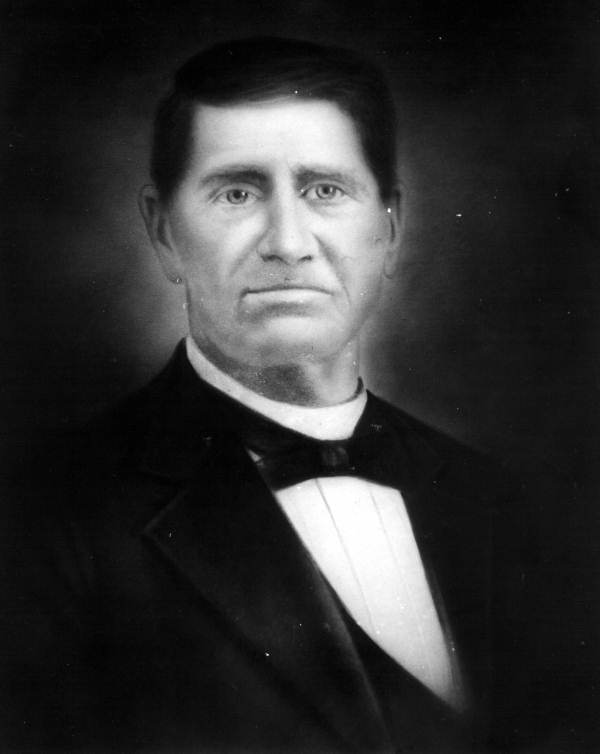

John Lovic Crawford (died January 24, 1902) was a doctor, state legislator, and Florida Secretary of State. Crawfordville, Florida is named for him. He succeeded F. W. A. Rankin Jr. and was succeeded by his son.

He was born in Greene County, Georgia.

Crawford was elected to the Florida House of Representatives in 1847, served in the Florida State Senate for several terms between 1868 and 1880, and served as Florida Secretary of State from 1881 until his death in 1902. He was succeeded as Florida Secretary of State by his son Henry Clay Crawford. He was photographed with other state leaders on the steps of the state capitol in 1885.

He married Elizabeth E. Walker in 1848.

Political offices
Preceded by Frederick W. A. Rankin, Jr.	Secretary of State of Florida; 1881–1902	Succeeded by Henry Clay Crawford
