= Laurel Lee =

American judge and politician (born 1974)

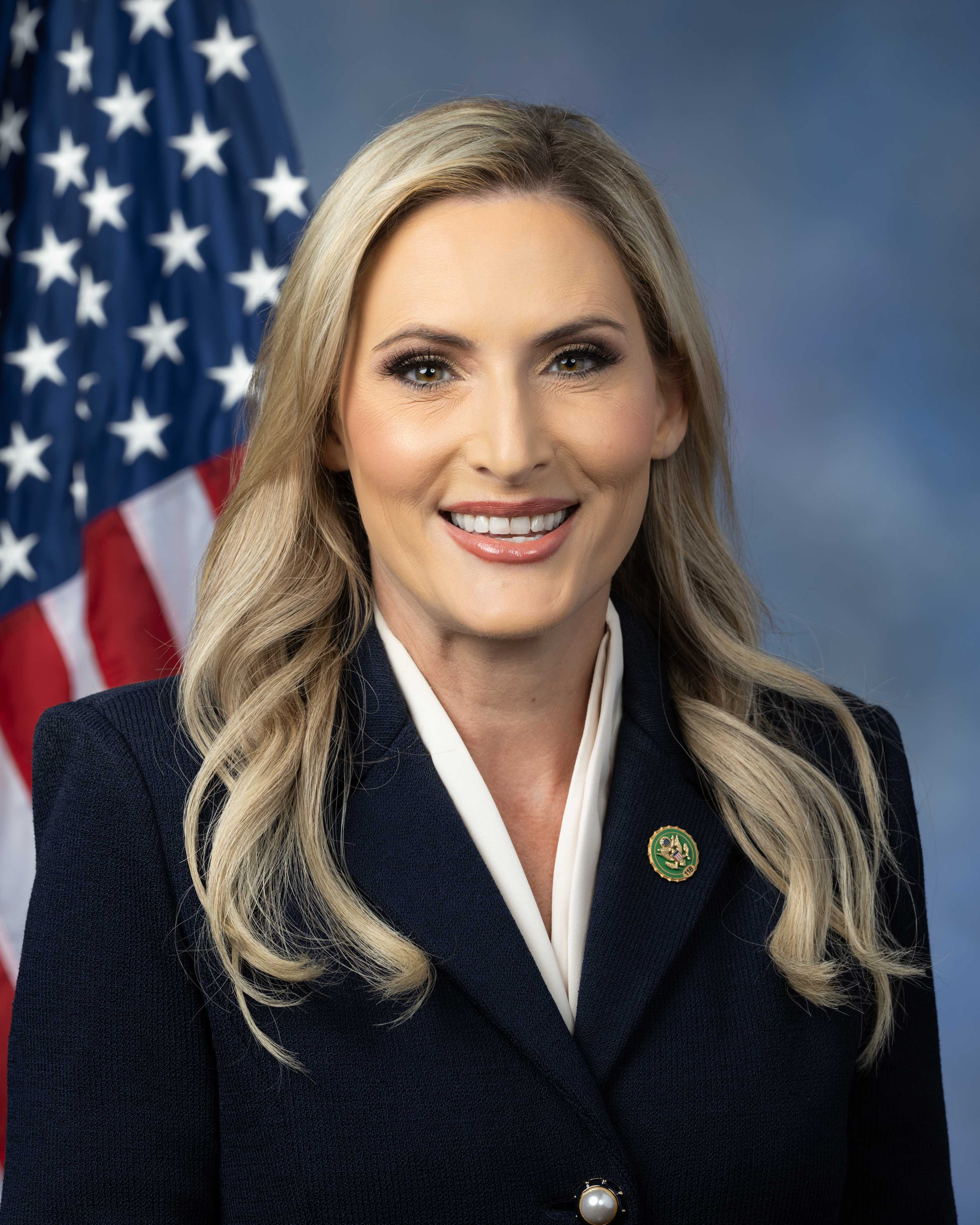
- Official portrait, 2023

Member of the U.S. House of Representatives from Florida's 15th district
- Incumbent
- Assumed office January 3, 2023
- Preceded by: Scott Franklin (redistricted)

36th Secretary of State of Florida
- In office January 28, 2019 – May 16, 2022
- Governor: Ron DeSantis
- Preceded by: Jennifer Kennedy (interim)
- Succeeded by: Cord Byrd

Judge of the Thirteenth Judicial Circuit Court of Florida
- In office May 5, 2013 – January 28, 2019
- Appointed by: Rick Scott
- Preceded by: Daniel Sleet
- Succeeded by: Thomas Palermo

Personal details
- Born: Laurel Frances Moore; March 26, 1974 (age 52) Wright-Patterson Air Force Base, Ohio, U.S.
- Party: Republican
- Spouse: Tom Lee
- Children: 3
- Education: University of Florida (BA, JD)
- Website: House website Campaign website

Laurel Frances Lee (née Moore; born March 26, 1974) is an American attorney, former judge, and politician serving as the U.S. representative for Florida's 15th congressional district since 2023. A member of the Republican Party, she previously served as Florida's secretary of state from 2019 to 2022 and as a judge on Florida's Thirteenth Judicial Circuit from 2013 to 2019.

== Early life and education ==
Lee was born on March 26, 1974, at Wright-Patterson Air Force Base in Ohio, the daughter of a U.S. Air Force officer who later attained the rank of major general and a public-school teacher. She graduated from the University of Florida, where she was inducted into the University of Florida Hall of Fame in 1999 and was a member of Florida Blue Key. She earned her Juris Doctor from the University of Florida Levin College of Law.

== Legal and judicial career ==
Lee began her legal career at Carlton Fields, P.A., specializing in antitrust and complex business litigation. She later served both as an Assistant Federal Public Defender and as an Assistant United States Attorney in the Middle District of Florida. As a federal prosecutor, she coordinated the federal-state Task Force on the Sexual Exploitation of Children and served as Violence Against Women Act coordinator.

In 2013, Governor (and currently U.S. Senator) Rick Scott appointed Lee to the Thirteenth Judicial Circuit Court in Hillsborough County. She was subsequently elected without opposition in 2014. During her tenure, she presided over civil, appellate, and domestic relations cases and served on Florida Supreme Court commissions.

== Florida Secretary of State (2019–2022) ==
Governor Ron DeSantis appointed Lee as Florida's 30th secretary of state in January 2019. She oversaw Florida's elections, corporate registrations, and cultural affairs.

In 2020, Florida saw a record turnout of more than 11 million ballots, the highest in nearly three decades, in an election widely regarded as secure and efficient. Under Lee's tenure, the Department of State implemented election security measures, referred fraudulent petition forms for investigation, and advanced voter registration security.

Lee resigned on May 16, 2022, to run for Congress.

== U.S. House of Representatives (2023–present) ==
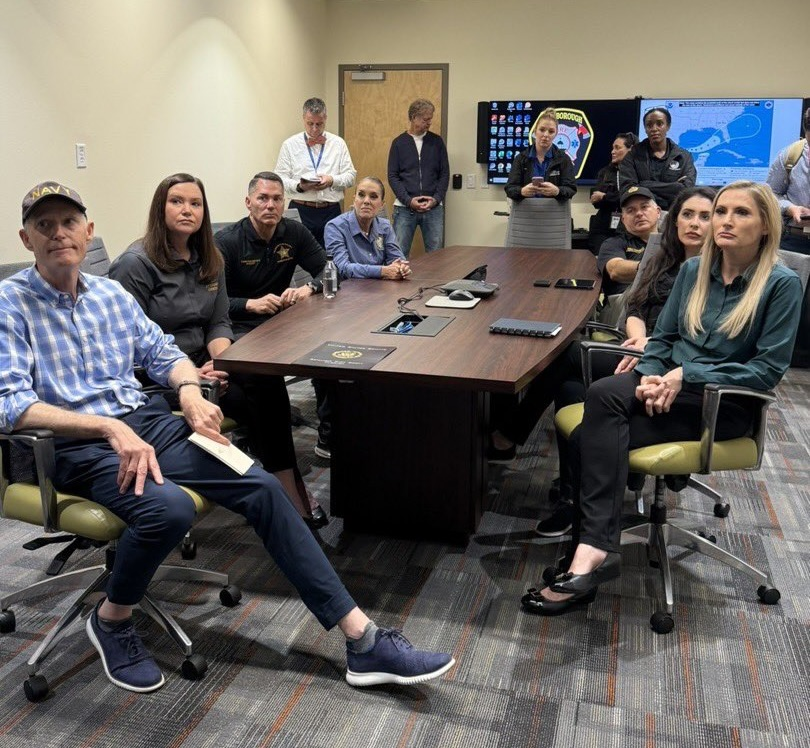
Lee with Senator Rick Scott, then-Attorney General Ashley Moody, Hillsborough County sheriff Chad Chronister, then-Chief Financial Officer Jimmy Patronis, and Congresswoman Anna Paulina Luna in the Hillsborough County, Florida Emergency Operations Center, responding to Hurricane Milton

=== Elections ===
In 2022, Lee won election to Florida's 15th congressional district, defeating Democrat Alan Cohn. She was sworn in on January 3, 2023. She was re-elected in 2024, defeating Democrat Pat Kemp.

=== Tenure ===
Lee has focused on national security, law enforcement, and technology policy. She was the lead sponsor of the Reforming Intelligence and Securing America Act (RISA), a bill to reauthorize the Foreign Intelligence Surveillance Act including Section 702. She also introduced the bipartisan DEFIANCE Act, addressing non-consensual "deepfake" intimate images.

She serves on the bipartisan House Task Force on Artificial Intelligence. She also sits on the Judiciary Committee's Subcommittees on Courts, Intellectual Property, and the Internet, and on Crime and Federal Government Surveillance, and on the Energy and Commerce Committee.

In 2024, Lee was named as an impeachment manager in the case against Secretary of Homeland Security Alejandro Mayorkas and was appointed to the bipartisan task force investigating the attempted assassination of President Donald Trump.

During her tenure in office, Lee has nearly doubled her net worth ($7.39 million in 2022 to $14.02 million in 2024). She has approximately $6.2 million invested in publicly traded assets as of January 2026.

=== Committee assignments ===
- Committee on Energy and Commerce
- Committee on the Judiciary
- Committee on House Administration (Vice Chair)
  - Subcommittee on Elections (Chair)

=== Caucus memberships ===
Lee is Vice Chair of the Main Street Caucus, and she is also a member of the Republican Study Committee, the Republic Governance Group, the Congressional Western Caucus and the Everglades Caucus.

== Personal life ==
Lee is married to Tom Lee, former president of the Florida Senate. They have three children and live in the Brandon area near Tampa. She has volunteered with Bay Area Legal Services' Domestic Violence Assistance Project and served on the board of the Emergency Care Help Organization (E.C.H.O.) of Brandon.

Political offices
Preceded by Mike Ertel	Secretary of State of Florida; 2019–2022	Succeeded by Cord Byrd
U.S. House of Representatives
Preceded by Scott Franklin	Member of the U.S. House of Representatives from Florida's 15th congressional district 2023–present	Incumbent
U.S. order of precedence (ceremonial)
Preceded by Mike Lawler	United States representatives by seniority 328th	Succeeded by Summer Lee
