= William Monroe Igou =

American politician

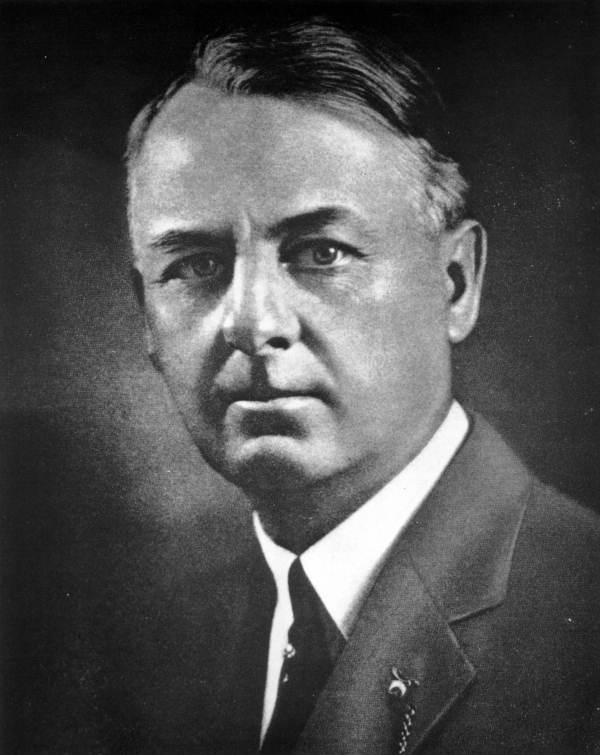
- Igou in 1930

13th Secretary of State of Florida
- In office 1929–1930
- Governor: Doyle E. Carlton
- Preceded by: Henry Clay Crawford
- Succeeded by: Robert Andrew Gray

Personal details
- Born: September 28, 1872; Georgia, U.S.
- Died: 1933 (aged 60–61)
- Political party: Democratic

William Monroe Igou (September 28, 1872 – 1933) was an American businessman, county commissioner, state legislator, and served as Florida Secretary of State in 1929 and 1930.

He was born in Georgia and moved to Florida at age 21. He married Annie Netherland. His photograph appeared in a composite with those of other 1915 Florida state senators.
