= Kurt S. Browning =

Florida Politician

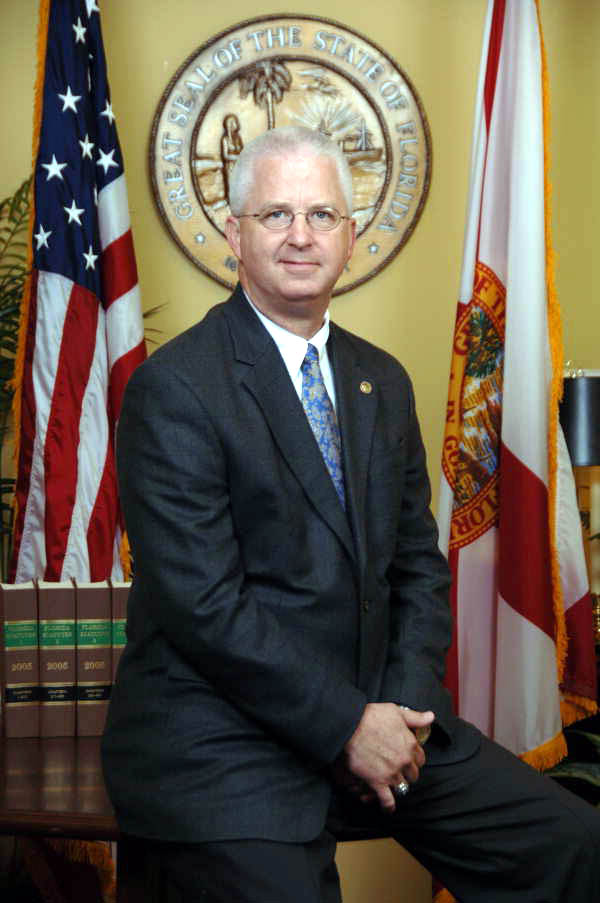
- Browning in 2007

Superintendent of Schools of Pasco County, Florida
- In office November 20, 2012 – November 19, 2024
- Preceded by: Heather Fiorentino
- Succeeded by: John Legg

32nd Secretary of State of Florida
- In office January 15, 2011 – February 17, 2012
- Governor: Rick Scott
- Preceded by: Jennifer Kennedy (acting)
- Succeeded by: Ken Detzner
- In office January 2, 2007 – April 30, 2010
- Governor: Charlie Crist
- Preceded by: Sue M. Cobb
- Succeeded by: Dawn K. Roberts (interim)

Supervisor of Elections of Pasco County
- In office 1980–2007
- Preceded by: Mary Morgan
- Succeeded by: Brian Corley

Personal details
- Party: Democratic (before 2002); Republican (after 2002)
- Education: University of South Florida

Kurt S. Browning is an American politician, who served Secretary of State of Florida and Superintendent of Schools for Pasco County, Florida. First elected as a member of the Democratic Party in 1980, he became a Republican in 2002.

== Career ==
Browning's political career began in 1975 when he worked in the Pasco County Supervisor of Elections office. In 1980, he was elected as the Pasco Supervisor himself, as a Democrat. At 22 years old, he was the youngest county elections official in Florida history. He served in that position for 26 years, until his appointment as secretary of state. During that time, Browning also served as the President of the Florida State Association of Supervisors of Elections, as a member of Governor Jeb Bush's Task Force on Election Procedures, Standards and Technology. He also served as a member of the State Planning Committee for the Help America Vote Act. Browning changed his party affiliation to Republican in 2002. In November 2012, Browning was elected superintendent of schools for Pasco County Schools, he served as superintendent for 12 years. Browning retired as superintendent of schools on November 19, 2024.

=== Secretary of State ===
Governor-elect Charlie Crist announced Browning's appointment as Secretary of State in December 2006. Browning served in that position until April 2010, when he resigned to comply with state retirement pension compensation laws. While out of office, he was honorary chairman of the failed campaign opposing two anti-gerrymandering constitutional amendments on the 2010 ballot, the "Fair Districts" Amendments 5 and 6. He was re-appointed Secretary of State by Governor Rick Scott in January 2011.

During his two stints as secretary, Browning oversaw the state's defense of several lawsuits challenging Florida's voting laws. He also oversaw the transition from using touchscreen voting machines to paper optical scan machines, despite being he was a strong advocate of touchscreen technology as Supervisor of Elections. Responsible for the Division of Corporations, which manages corporate filings, Browning eliminated paper records and instituted electronic filing for businesses, including a searchable public website.

=== Superintendent of Schools ===
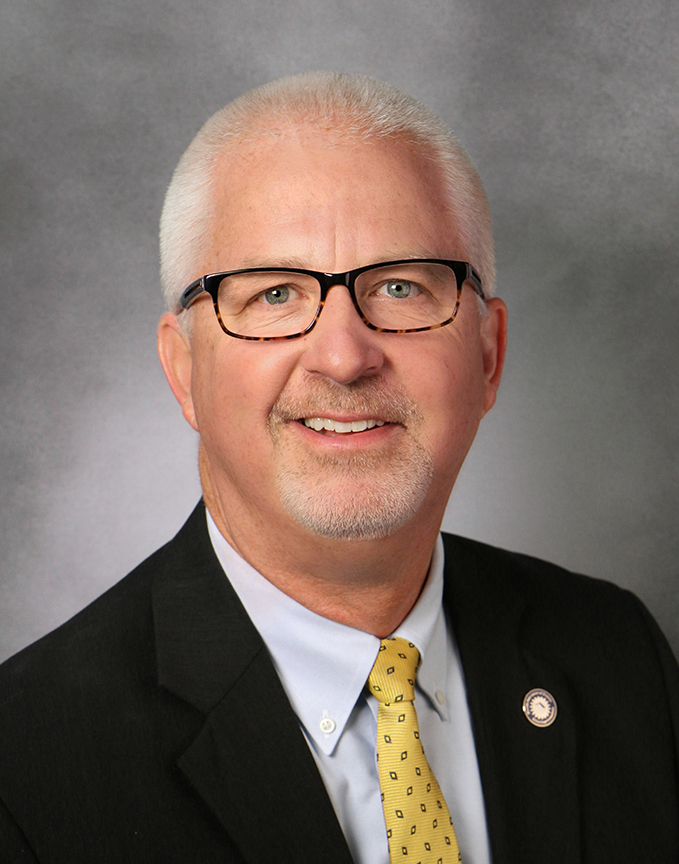
Official portrait as superintendent

Browning announced his resignation as Secretary of State on January 11, 2012, effective February 17, 2012. Several weeks later, he announced that he would run for Pasco County Superintendent of Schools. He was elected to that position on November 6, 2012, after defeating two-term incumbent Heather Fiorentino in the Republican primary. After three terms on November 19, 2024, Browning retired from Superintendent of Schools. Browning was succeeded by John Legg.

== Background ==
Browning is a native Floridian. He received a bachelor's degree in political science and a master's degree in public administration from the University of South Florida. He has been involved in the Pasco County community for much of his career, including service as President of Downtown Dade City Main Street, Inc., and involvement with organizations including the Boy Scouts of America and the Pasco County United Way.
