= 1970 Florida Attorney General election =

- November 3, 1970
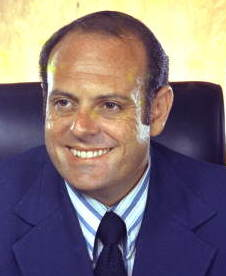

Nominee	Robert Shevin	Thom Rumberger
Party	Democratic	Republican
Popular vote	943,776	592,519
Percentage	61.4%	38.6%
- County results Shevin: 50–60% 60–70% 70–80% 80–90% Rumberger: 50–60% 60–70%

The 1970 Florida Attorney General election was held on November 3, 1970. Robert Shevin would be elected winning 61.43% of the vote and defeated Thom Rumberger.

== Primary elections ==
=== Democratic primary ===
The Democratic Party would hold its primary on September 8, 1970.

==== Candidates ====
- Robert Shevin
- Elmer Friday, State Senator and former Lee County judge.
- William A. Meadows, Jr.

=== Republican primary ===
The Republican Party did not hold a primary as Thom Rumberger was unopposed.

== General election ==
=== Candidates ===
Robert Shevin, Democratic

Thom Rumberger, Republican

=== Results ===
1970 Florida Attorney General election
Party	Candidate	Votes	%	±%
Democratic	Robert Shevin	943.776	61.43%	−4.76
Republican	Thom Rumberger	592,519	38.57%	+4.75
Democratic hold		Swing		
