= Gifford Grange =

American politician (1933–2011)

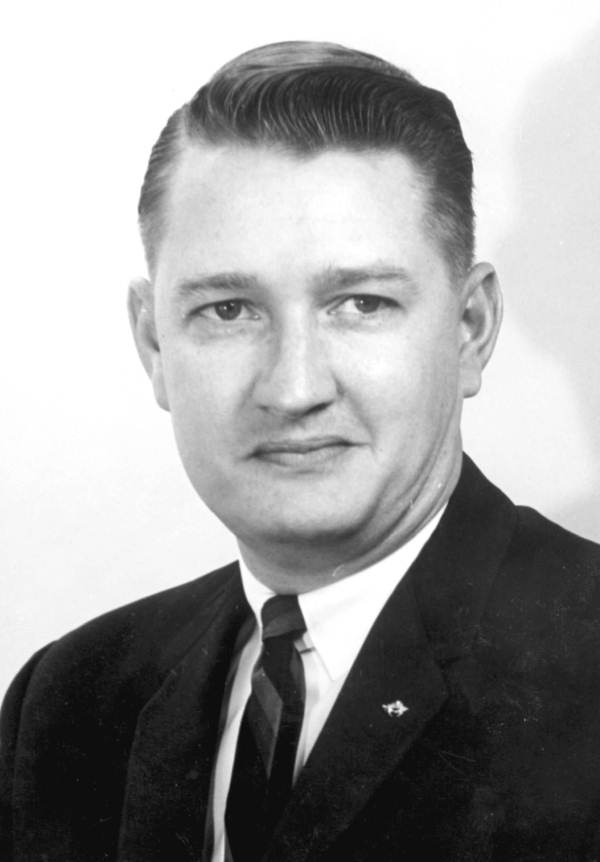
- Grange in 1966

Member of the Florida House of Representatives from Duval County
- In office 1966–1967

Member of the Florida House of Representatives from the 25th district
- In office 1967–1968
- Preceded by: District established
- Succeeded by: R. Earl Dixon

Personal details
- Born: August 26, 1933 Jacksonville, Florida, U.S.
- Died: July 1, 2011 (aged 77) Spruce Pine, North Carolina, U.S.
- Party: Democratic; Republican
- Education: University of Florida

Gifford Grange Jr. (August 26, 1933 – July 1, 2011) was an American politician. He served as a Democratic member for the 25th district of the Florida House of Representatives.

== Life and career ==
Grange was born in Jacksonville, Florida. He attended United States Naval Academy and the University of Florida.

In 1966, Grange was elected to the Florida House of Representatives. The next year, he was elected as the first representative for the newly-established 25th district. He served until 1968, when he was succeeded by R. Earl Dixon.

Grange died on July 1, 2011 at his summer home in Spruce Pine, North Carolina, at the age of 77.
