= Bruce Smathers =

American politician

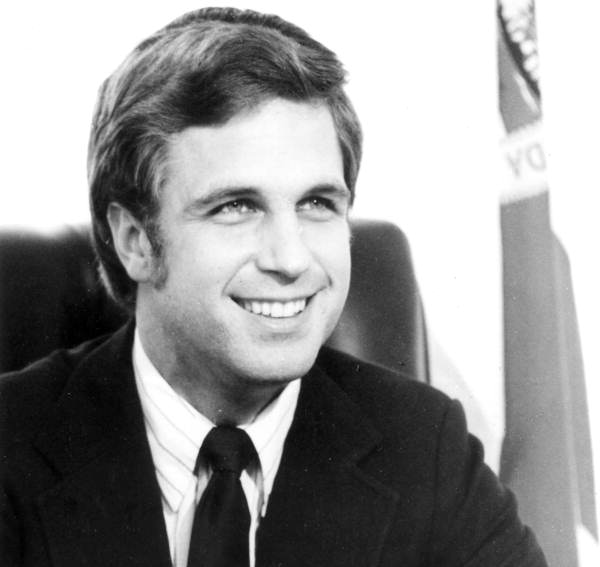
- Official portrait, c. 1975

18th Secretary of State of Florida
- In office January 7, 1975 – July 19, 1978
- Governor: Reubin Askew
- Preceded by: Dorothy Glisson
- Succeeded by: Jesse J. McCrary Jr.

Member of the Florida Senate from the 9th district
- In office November 7, 1972 – November 5, 1974
- Preceded by: Lynwood Arnold
- Succeeded by: Mattox Hair

Personal details
- Born: Bruce Armistead Smathers; October 3, 1943 (age 83) Miami, Florida, U.S.
- Party: Democratic
- Parent: George Smathers (father)
- Education: Yale University (BA); University of Florida (JD)
- Occupation: Lawyer; investor; politician

Military service
- Branch/service: United States Navy
- Battles/wars: Vietnam War

Bruce Armistead Smathers (born October 3, 1943) is a retired Democratic politician from Florida. He served as the 18th Secretary of State of Florida from 1975 to 1978.

== Political career ==
Smathers began his political career in 1972, when he was elected to the Florida Senate from the 9th District, representing most of Duval County. He had entered an already-crowded primary election field, facing incumbents Bill Beaufort and Lynwood Arnold, after the two were drawn into the same district. Smathers advanced to the primary runoff with Arnold, who he went on to defeat.

In 1974, he was elected Secretary of State. Once in office, Smathers reformed election laws, modernized the Division of Corporations, became involved in the "Atocha" treasure dispute, expanded support for cultural affairs, and was best known as leader of the successful effort to preserve Florida's Old Capitol (1845–1978). At the time he took office, he was the youngest member of the Florida Cabinet in the twentieth century.

In July 1978, Smathers resigned to campaign for governor. He lost in the Democratic primary to Bob Graham.

== Family and background ==
He is the younger son of George Smathers, former Congressman and U.S. Senator for Florida. After attending the St. Alban's School, Smathers earned an undergraduate degree in Economics from Yale University (with honors) and a law degree from University of Florida (Florida Blue Key and Florida Law Review). A NROTC graduate, Smathers was commissioned as an ensign in the United States Navy. Smathers received assignment to Naval Amphibious Base Coronado and subsequently completed Underwater Demolition Training Replacement Accession (UDTRA) training class 36, now known as BUD/S training. Smathers was assigned to Underwater Demolition Team Eleven (UDT-11), served with Naval Special Warfare Pacific, and was a decorated Vietnam War Veteran.

== College relations ==
Smathers was college roommates with two different members of Congress. Smathers roomed with U.S. Senator Bill Nelson during undergraduate studies at Yale University.

Party political offices
Preceded by Richard Stone	Democratic nominee for Secretary of State of Florida; 1974	Succeeded by George Firestone
Florida Senate
Preceded by Lynwood Arnold	Member of the Florida Senate from the 9th district 1972–1974	Succeeded by Mattox Hair
Political offices
Preceded by Dorothy Glisson	Secretary of State of Florida; 1975–1978	Succeeded by Jesse J. McCrary Jr.
