= John R. Forbes =

American politician

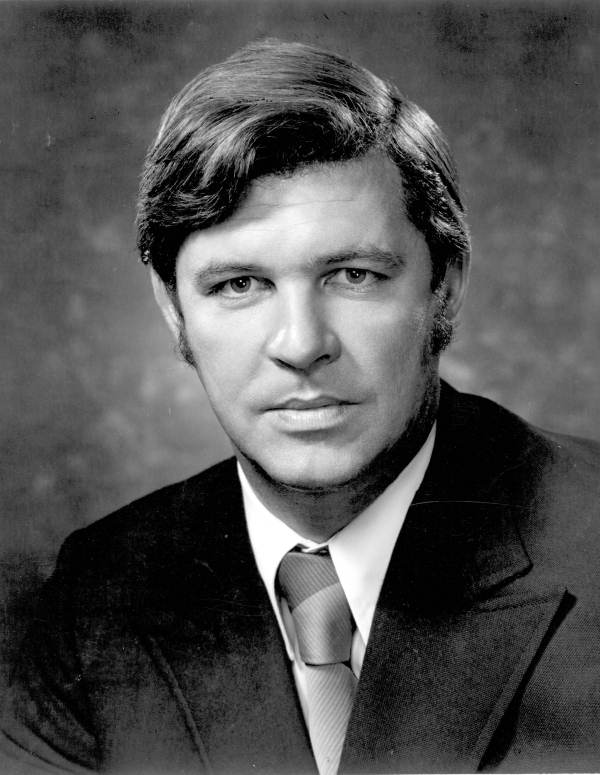
- Forbes in 1972

Member of the Florida House of Representatives from the 23rd district
- In office 1970–1972
- Preceded by: Lynwood Arnold
- Succeeded by: R. Earl Dixon

Member of the Florida House of Representatives from the 17th district
- In office 1972–1978
- Preceded by: Wayne Hollingsworth
- Succeeded by: John Thomas

Personal details
- Party: Democratic

John R. Forbes is an American politician. He served as a Democratic member for the 17th and 23rd district of the Florida House of Representatives.

== Life and career ==
Forbes was a district attorney.

In 1970, Forbes was elected to represent the 23rd district of the Florida House of Representatives, succeeding Lynwood Arnold. He served until 1972, when he was succeeded by R. Earl Dixon. In the same year, he was elected to represent the 17th district, succeeding Wayne Hollingsworth. He served until 1978, when he was succeeded by John Thomas.
