= Theresa LePore =

American local elected official

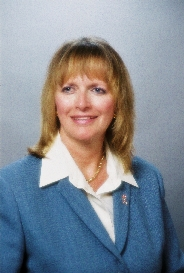
Theresa LePore

Theresa LePore is an American former politician who was the Supervisor of Elections for Palm Beach County, Florida. First elected in 1996, she designed the infamous "butterfly ballot" used in the 2000 presidential election. This would lead the press to nickname her "Madame Butterfly". Following the controversial results of the 2000 election, she lost her re-election bid in September 2004 and left office in January 2005.

== Career ==
LePore grew up in Palm Beach County, attending Cardinal Newman High School in West Palm Beach, Palm Beach State College in Lake Worth and Florida Atlantic University in Boca Raton. She began her career in the Supervisor of Elections Office in 1971 as a file clerk. She quickly rose through the ranks and achieved the position of Chief Deputy Supervisor in the late 1970s. During the 1980s, she moonlighted as a ramp clerk at Palm Beach International Airport.

In 1996, LePore ran as a Democrat for the position of Supervisor of Elections. She was elected as the Palm Beach County Supervisor of Elections in November 1996 and re-elected without opposition in November 2000. LePore switched to No Party Affiliation after the 2000 election. In 2004, she lost re-election as Election Supervisor. After leaving the Supervisor of Elections Office in January 2005, she was employed by the Palm Beach County State Attorney's Office for a short period, enabling her to receive her full pension from Palm Beach County. She then worked at her alma mater, Cardinal Newman High School in West Palm Beach as director of development until January 2009.

== Affiliations ==
LePore has been a member of the following organizations:

- American Society of Public Administration
- The Election Center
- Kiwanis of Flagler Sunrise
- League of Women Voters
- International Association of Clerks, Recorders, Election Officials and Treasurers
- Women's Chamber of Commerce of the Palm Beaches
- Florida State Association of Supervisors of Election. Theresa served terms as Secretary, Vice-President, and President of FSASE.
- Executive Women of the Palm Beaches
- The Hispanic Chamber of Commerce of PBC
- Hispanic Human Resources Council
- Girl Scouts of Southeast Florida

== Election controversy ==
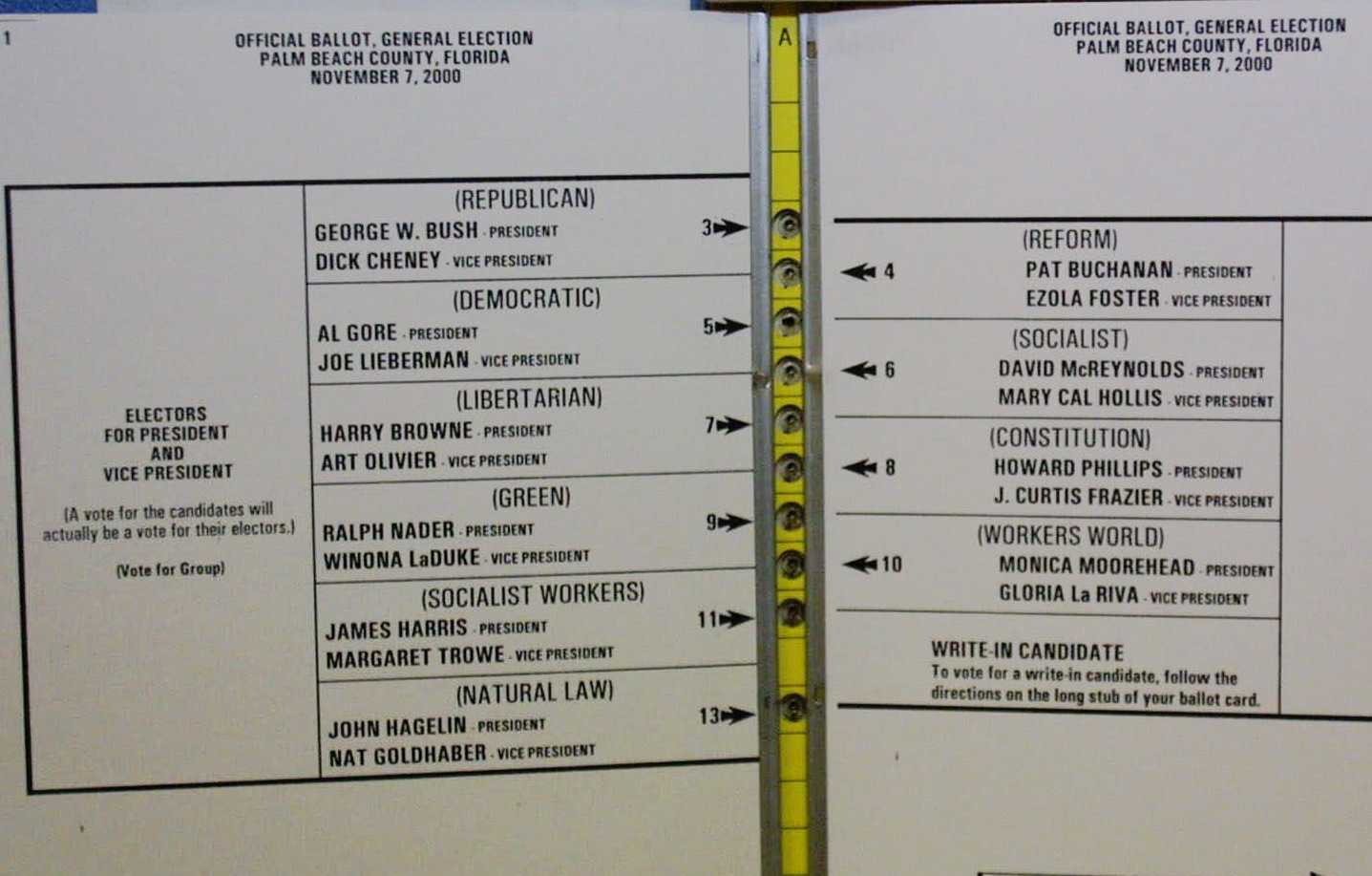
"Butterfly ballot" from Palm Beach County, 2000 election

In 2000, to accommodate the large number of presidential candidates eligible in Florida, LePore designed a staggered two-page format with candidate names on alternating sides of a central punch button column. Some conservatives claimed the same ballot was successfully used in the 1996 election; in fact, it had never been used in a Palm Beach County election among rival candidates for office.

A study by The Palm Beach Post speculated that voters confused by Palm Beach County's butterfly ballot cost Al Gore the presidency. A 2024 study by The New York Times described it as "a slam dunk" that, all else being equal, the ballot design swung the election to George W. Bush.

In 2008, LePore was reportedly writing a book about the 2000 election and the butterfly ballot she designed.

== Popular culture ==
In Jay Roach's Recount, LePore is played by Jayne Atkinson.
