= Florida State Teachers Association =

- Headquarters: Florida
- Leader: Edward Daniel Davis
- Leader: Gilbert Laurence Porter

The Florida State Teachers Association (FSTA) was an organization of Black educators, administrators, other staff, and parents in Florida. Black teachers faced discrimination and underfunded schools. Activist educators in the group advocated for civil rights and educational opportunities.

== History ==
The FSTA was founded in 1890 as the Association of Colored Teachers. In the early 1920s, it was renamed the Florida State Teachers Association (FSTA). In 1966, following decades of advocacy for Black educators, the group merged with the Florida Education Association (FEA) to create a single, racially integrated statewide organization. In 1974, the integrated FEA split into two rival groups over disagreements on how to run the union. In 2000, the two rivals, the Florida Teaching Profession (NEA) and FEA-United (AFT), merged back together to form the modern Florida Education Association.

It was the largest teacher organization in Florida. Hubert Humphrey prepared a speech to the group in 1964. The group published the Florida State Teachers' Bulletin.

The Tampa branch helped organize the Turner v Keefe lawsuit targeting lower pay for Boack teachers.

Emmett W. Bashful, a political scientist at Florida A& M University, surveyed members about voter registration and voting by group members.

The Florida Archives include a photo of the group's kitchen in Tallahassee.

Edward Daniel Davis and Gilbert Lawrence Porter were leaders in the group. A book discusses Porter's work. A Miami elementary school is named for him.

School boards closed schools for African Americans and many Black teachers and administrators lost their jobs.
