= James C. Smith (politician) =

American politician

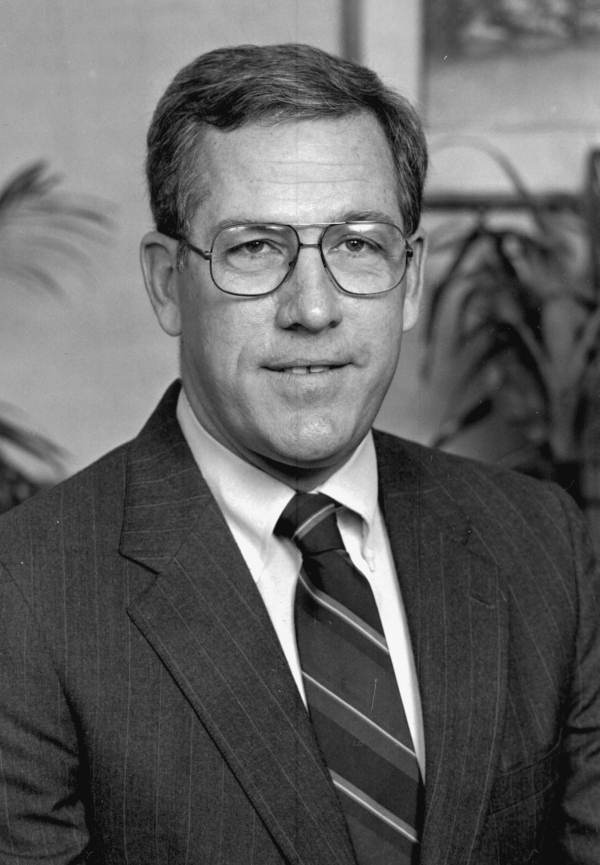

21st and 24th Secretary of State of Florida
- In office August 5, 2002 – January 7, 2003
- Governor: Jeb Bush
- Preceded by: Katherine Harris
- Succeeded by: Ken Detzner (acting)
- In office August 5, 1987 – January 3, 1995
- Governor: Bob Martinez; Lawton Chiles
- Preceded by: George Firestone
- Succeeded by: Sandra Mortham

32nd Attorney General of Florida
- In office January 2, 1979 – January 6, 1987
- Governor: Bob Graham
- Preceded by: Robert Shevin
- Succeeded by: Bob Butterworth

Personal details
- Born: May 25, 1940 (age 86) Jacksonville, Florida, U.S.
- Party: Democratic (before 1987); Republican (after 1987)
- Education: Florida State University (BS); Stetson University (JD)
- Profession: Attorney

James Cloudis Smith (born May 25, 1940) is an American lawyer who served as the 32nd Attorney General of Florida from 1979 to 1987 and 21st and 24th Secretary of State of Florida from 1987 to 1995 and from 2002 until 2003. He currently chairs the Florida State University Board of Trustees.

== Career ==
=== Early years ===
Smith received his Bachelor of Science degree in Government and Public Administration from Florida State University in 1962, and while in college he was a member of the Alpha Tau Omega fraternity. In addition he received his Juris Doctor from Stetson University College of Law in 1967. Also he served in the reserves of the United States Army and earned the rank of second lieutenant.

=== Political involvement ===
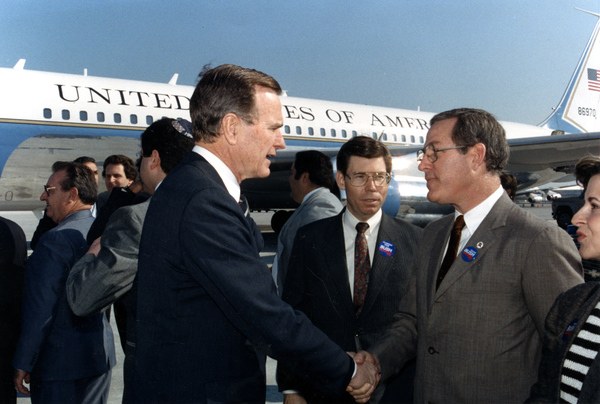
Smith greeting George H. W. Bush in 1988

Smith started out as a Democrat in his political career. He became Florida attorney general in 1979, succeeding Robert Shevin, and he served in this capacity until 1987. In 1986, he ran for Governor of Florida. The Democratic primary was initially a three-man race, with Smith facing Senate President Harry Johnston and Florida Representative Steve Pajcic. During the primary campaign, Smith pledged to support the eventual Democratic nominee. Smith and Pajcic survived the first round of the primary, and the widespread assumption was that Johnston, whose political beliefs were more closely aligned with Smith's than Pajcic's, would endorse Smith in the runoff primary. However, Johnston came out and endorsed Pajcic because, he said, Smith was running dishonest ads falsely linking Pajcic to pornographers and homosexual marriage. In the runoff primary, Smith narrowly lost the Democratic runoff to Pajcic, and then bitterly refused to campaign for Pajcic, despite his earlier pledge to support the party's nominee. Smith's snub of Pajcic was rewarded by victorious candidate Bob Martinez, who placed Smith on his transition team and appointed Smith to the position of Secretary of State of Florida.

Upon joining the Martinez Administration, Smith officially became a Republican (1987) and as such was the first Republican to serve in the state cabinet since the Reconstruction era. During the Florida elections of 1988, he became alongside Tom Gallagher the first Republican elected to the state cabinet since the Reconstruction era. He served as secretary of state until 1995. He ran for Governor of Florida in 1994, but lost the primary to Jeb Bush. He again was appointed to the office of Secretary of State of Florida after Katherine Harris won the Republican nomination for a seat in the United States House of Representatives in August 2002; Smith held the position until January 2003.

When it was announced that U.S. Senator Mel Martinez would resign from the Senate during the August 2009 recess, there was widespread speculation that Smith would be appointed to replace him, with the expectation that Smith would be a caretaker who would not seek reelection to a full term. However, Governor Charlie Crist appointed George LeMieux instead.

When not holding government office, Smith has spent his time in private legal practice in Tallahassee, Florida. He is currently a shareholder for Smith & Ballard and serves as chairman of the board at Florida State.

== See also ==
- List of American politicians who switched parties in office

Party political offices
| Preceded by Robert Shevin | Democratic nominee for Attorney General of Florida; 1978, 1982 | Succeeded by Bob Butterworth |
| Preceded by James H. "Jim" Smith | Republican nominee for Secretary of State of Florida; 1988, 1990 | Succeeded by Sandra Mortham |
| Preceded by Charles Bronson | Republican nominee for Florida Commissioner of Agriculture; 1994 | Succeeded by Rich Faircloth |
Legal offices
| Preceded by Robert Shevin | Attorney General of Florida; 1979-1987 | Succeeded by Bob Butterworth |
Political offices
| Preceded by George Firestone | Secretary of State of Florida; 1987-1995 | Succeeded by Sandra Mortham |
| Preceded by Katherine Harris | Secretary of State of Florida; 2002-2003 | Succeeded by Ken Detzner |
