= Blitchton, Florida =

Unincorporated community in Florida, U.S.

Coordinates: 29°16′57″N 82°20′12″W

Blitchton is an unincorporated community in Marion County, in the U.S. state of Florida.

== History ==
A post office called Blichton was established in 1888, and remained in operation until it was discontinued in 1917. The community was named for Dr. Simeon Hardee Blitch.The Florida Blitch Lineage began with James Blitch. In the mid-1830s, James Blitch moved from Effingham County, GA, to Nassau County, FL, for a couple of years, then to what is now Marion County, FL. where he applied for, and received, 160 acres under the 1843 Homestead Act. The conditions of the Homestead Act were to establish a homestead, grow crops, and keep the Native American Indians off the land. A circuit rider traveled throughout the territory to verify adherence to these conditions. He was even given a weapon! The Blitch “cracker home” was made of trees which he felled with an axe. The trees were growing on the property he was homesteading. The material used to insulate between the logs was a mixture of clay and Spanish moss. In Effingham County, James Blitch had married Martha Willis of the Williston family. Williston is a town near Montbrook. James and Martha had several children. The youngest of the children, Simeon Hardee Blitch, grew up to be a notable person in the areas surrounding Williston and beyond. Dr. Blitch as became known traveled as far as Raiford State Prison near Gainesville, FL Simeon was born on March 19, 1855. He became a doctor and dentist, and an incredibly important and needed member of the community. James helped Simeon in other ways as well. He helped fund the purchase of the key piece of land at the intersection of two important “wagon trails.” Today those trails have become the intersecting highways of Highway 326 and State Highway 27. In time, the area to the west of that intersection and the intersection itself became Blitchton. The town is named after Dr. Simeon Hardy Blitch. Dr. Simeon Hardy Blitch was known throughout all of Marion County, surrounding areas and the State of Florida. His job was laborious however, in spite of poor working conditions and long hours, he continually worked to take care of those who needed him. Dr. Blitch went on to become the State Senator from Marion County, Florida. Some would say that ‘he worked his fingers to the bone’. Upon his passing, The Ocala Evening Star reported that “All over Florida, deep sorrow will be felt.” Simeon was a beloved old-fashioned country Doctor.

== Notable person ==
Jesse J. McCrary, Jr., a Florida Secretary of State, was born in Blichton. Dr. Simeon Hardy Blitch, a Florida State Senator was the founder of Blitchton, FL.
