= Jesse J. McCrary Jr. =

American politician

Jesse McCrary
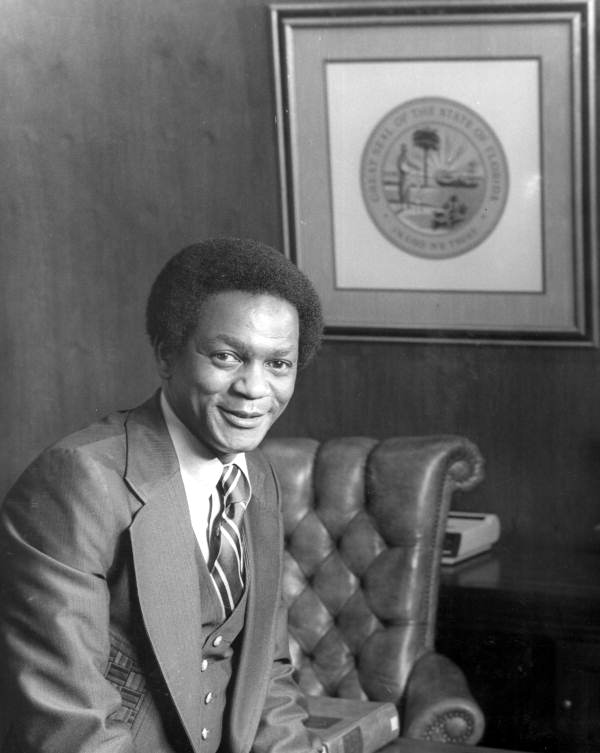

19th Florida Secretary of State
- In office July 19, 1978 – January 2, 1979
- Governor: Reubin Askew
- Preceded by: Bruce Smathers
- Succeeded by: George Firestone

Personal details
- Born: Jesse James McCrary Jr. September 16, 1937 Blitchton, Florida, U.S.
- Died: October 29, 2007 (aged 70) Miami, Florida, U.S.
- Education: Florida A&M University (BA, JD)
- Profession: Attorney

Jesse James McCrary Jr. (September 16, 1937 – October 29, 2007) was an American lawyer from the U.S. state of Florida. A civil rights activist, he entered state politics and served as Secretary of State of Florida for five months from 1978 to 1979, becoming the first black member of the Florida Cabinet since the end of Reconstruction. He was inducted into the Florida Civil Rights Hall of Fame.

== Early life and education ==
McCrary was born in 1937 in Blitchton, Florida, the son of a Baptist preacher. He attended Howard Academy in Ocala. He was the quarterback of the school's championship football team. He was a political science major at Florida Agricultural and Mechanical University, where he was a civil rights activist, organizing sit-ins in Tallahassee. He was also on the debate team, a member of the drama club and an ROTC cadet. He served in the Military Intelligence Corps before graduating from Florida A&M University College of Law with his Juris Doctor in 1965.

== Career ==
In 1967, McCrary became Florida's first assistant Attorney General. He dealt with criminal appeals and advised the state Racing Commission. Three years later, he became the first black lawyer to argue a case before the Supreme Court of the United States on behalf of a Southern state (the case was Williams v. State of Florida; the court decided in favor of the state, which was seeking to uphold a law allowing six-person juries in non-capital criminal cases).

In the 1970s, McCrary was a partner in the law firm McCrary, Ferguson and Leethrough. He issued a report critical of Opa-locka's government and police department, was the Dade County School Board's first black attorney, and was appointed by Governor Reubin Askew to a Florida Industrial Commission judgeship. At the time, he was Florida's highest-paid black official.

After returning to private practice for five years, McCrary was appointed in 1977 to the Florida Constitution Revision Commission by Askew. The following year, Askew appointed him Secretary of State of Florida to finish the unexpired term of Bruce Smathers, who had resigned to run for governor. As Secretary of State, he recommended judicial appointees to the governor.

McCrary returned to private practice in 1979 and was active in the community in the 1980s and 1990s. He represented an embattled county commissioner in a public corruption scandal. He was part of the effort to have the board allow single-member districts. In 1991, he served as the unpaid chair of a local community services organization which he saved form bankruptcy. In 2000, he was appointed to the Board of Miami Children's Hospital. In 2001, he was named to a commission that made recommendations to Senior Judge Lenore C. Nesbitt in a federal condemnation suit brought by the National Park Service to acquire land for Everglades National Park. In 2003, the Florida Legislature passed a resolution recognizing his work on ten landmark Florida Supreme Court cases.

In December 1992, McCabe became a member of the Non-Group (a civically influential group of Miami-Dade business and civic leaders).

== Death ==
McCrary died in 2007 of lung cancer.
