= Frank Williams (politician) =

American politician

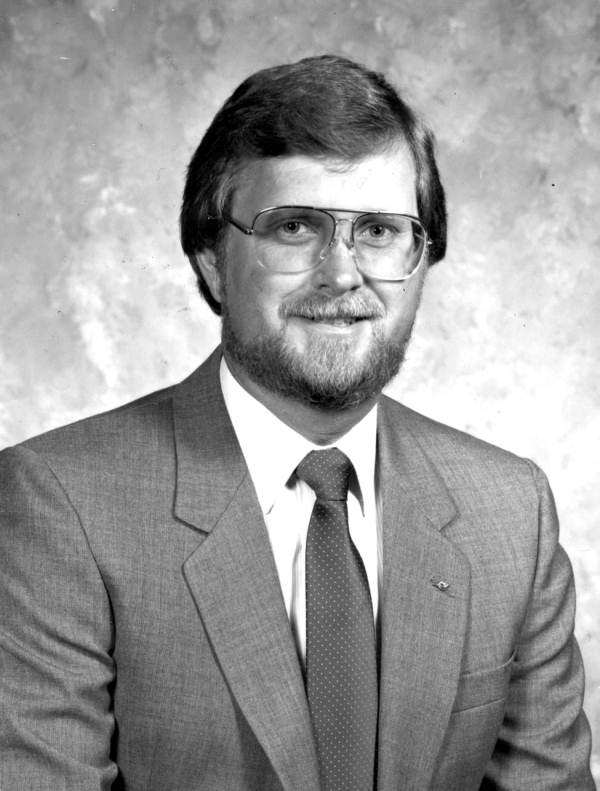
- Williams, c. 1980s

Member of the Florida House of Representatives
- In office 1972–1984

Personal details
- Born: September 27, 1942 (age 84) Waycross, Georgia
- Party: Democratic
- Education: University of Florida
- Occupation: Public Relations, public administration, mortgage broker

Frank Williams (born September 27, 1942) was an American politician in the state of Florida.

Williams was born in Georgia and came to Florida in 1952. He worked in public relations and public administration and was also a mortgage broker. He served in the Florida House of Representatives for the 25th district from 1972 to 1984, as a Democrat.
