= Secretary of State of Florida =

Constitutional officer of state government of Florida, US

- Official seal
- Incumbent; Jennifer Kennedy (interim) since November 20, 2026
- Inaugural holder: James T. Archer; 1845
- Formation: Florida Constitution; 1838
- Website: dos.fl.gov

The secretary of state of Florida is an executive officer of the state government of the U.S. state of Florida, established since the original 1838 state constitution. Like the corresponding officials in other states, the original charge of the secretary of state—to be the "Keeper of the Great Seal"—has expanded greatly since the office was first created. According to the state website, "Today, the Secretary of State is Florida's Chief of Elections, Chief Cultural Officer, the State Protocol Officer and the head of the Department of State."

The current secretary is Jennifer Kennedy. She is currently serving in an interim capacity following the resignation of Secretary Cord Byrd on November 20, 2026. She has previously served as interim secretary in 2011 and 2019, and prior to this term held the position of Assistant Secretary of State.

== History ==
During the territorial period of Florida, the secretary of the territory was one of two major appointed positions within the executive department of the territory. Like the governor, the secretary was originally appointed by the president of the United States and confirmed by Congress. The job of the secretary was similar to that of a modern-day lieutenant governor, assuming administrative responsibilities of the territory in the absence of the governor. For example, the first secretary of the territory George Walton served as Acting Governor of the Territory until William P. Duval assumed office later that year. Walton was the first civilian to act in this capacity following the American acquisition of Florida.

The modern-day Department of State and the position of Secretary of State dates to 1845, when Florida achieved statehood. The secretary of state of Florida was elected by the people of the state in a general election. In 1998, constitutional changes removed the secretary of state from the elected Cabinet of the executive branch. That year, Katherine Harris won the last election for secretary of state and since 2002, the secretary of state of Florida has been appointed by the governor.

== List of secretaries of the Territory of Florida ==
| # | Name | Term of service |
|---|---|---|
| 1 | George Walton | 1822–1827 |
| 2 | William M. McCarty | 1827–1829 |
| 3 | James Westcott | 1829–1834 |
| 4 | George K. Walker | 1834–1835 |
| 5 | John P. Duval | 1837–1839 |
| 6 | Joseph McCants | 1840–1841 |
| 7 | Thomas H. Duval | 1841–1845 |

== List of secretaries of the State of Florida ==
Secretaries of state by party affiliation
| Party | Secretaries of state |
|---|---|
| Republican | 20 |
| Democratic | 16 |
| Whig | 1 |

| # | Image | Name | Term of service | Political party |
|---|---|---|---|---|
| 1 | | James T. Archer | 1845–1848 | Democratic |
| 2 | | Augustus Maxwell | 1848–1849 | Democratic |
| 3 | | Charles W. Downing Jr. | 1849–1853 | Whig |
| 4 | | Frederick L. Villepigue | 1853–1863 | Democratic |
| 5 | | Benjamin F. Allen | 1863–1868 | Democratic |
| 6 | | George J. Alden | 1868 | Republican |
| 7 | | Jonathan Clarkson Gibbs | 1868–1873 | Republican |
| 8 | | Samuel B. McLin | 1873–1877 | Republican |
| 9 | | William D. Bloxham | 1877–1880 | Democratic |
| 10 | | Frederick W. A. Rankin Jr. | 1880–1881 | Democratic |
| 11 | | John L. Crawford | 1881–1902 | Democratic |
| 12 | | Henry Clay Crawford | 1902–1929 | Democratic |
| 13 | | William Monroe Igou | 1929–1930 | Democratic |
| 14 | | Robert Andrew Gray | 1930–1961 | Democratic |
| 15 | | Thomas Burton Adams Jr. | 1961–1971 | Democratic |
| 16 | | Richard Stone | 1971–1974 | Democratic |
| 17 | | Dorothy Glisson | 1974–1975 | Democratic |
| 18 | | Bruce Smathers | 1975–1978 | Democratic |
| 19 | | Jesse J. McCrary Jr. | 1978–1979 | Democratic |
| 20 | | George Firestone | 1979–1987 | Democratic |
| 21 | | James C. Smith | 1987–1995 | Republican |
| 22 | | Sandra Mortham | 1995–1999 | Republican |
| 23 | | Katherine Harris | 1999–2002 | Republican |
| 24 | | James C. Smith | 2002–2003 | Republican |
| 25 | | Ken Detzner | 2003 | Republican |
| 26 | | Glenda Hood (Note: Starting in 2003, the Florida Secretary of State was no longer an elective position. Rather, Secretaries of State are now appointed directly by the Governor of Florida.) | 2003–2005 | Republican |
| 27 | | David E. Mann | 2005 | Republican |
| 28 | | Sue M. Cobb | 2005–2007 | Republican |
| 29 | | Kurt S. Browning | 2007–2010 | Republican |
| 30 | | Dawn K. Roberts | 2010–2011 (interim) | Republican |
| 31 | | Jennifer Kennedy | 2011 (interim) | Republican |
| 32 | | Kurt S. Browning | 2011–2012 | Republican |
| 33 | | Ken Detzner | 2012–2019 | Republican |
| 34 | | Mike Ertel | 2019 | Republican |
| 35 | | Jennifer Kennedy | 2019 (interim) | Republican |
| 36 | | Laurel Lee | 2019–2022 | Republican |
| 37 | | Cord Byrd | 2022–2026 | Republican |
| 38 | | Jennifer Kennedy | 2026-present (interim) | Republican |

== See also ==
- List of company registers
