= Ted Alvarez Jr. =

American politician (1929–2022)

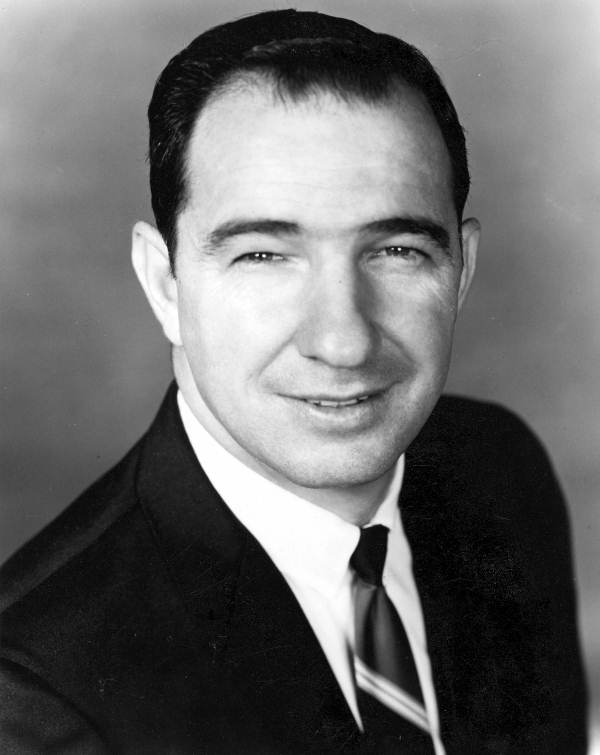

Member of the Florida House of Representatives for the 19th district
- In office 1967–1971

Personal details
- Born: September 27, 1929 Jacksonville, Florida, U.S.
- Died: May 31, 2022 (aged 92)
- Party: Democratic
- Occupation: milk executive

Ted "Milkman" Alvarez Jr. (September 27, 1929 – May 31, 2022) was an American politician in the state of Florida. Alvarez was born in Jacksonville. He attended University of Florida and was a dairy executive. From 1966 to 1972, he served in the Florida House of Representatives, representing the 19th district for four terms.

Alvarez died on May 31, 2022, at the age of 92.
