= George Firestone =

American politician

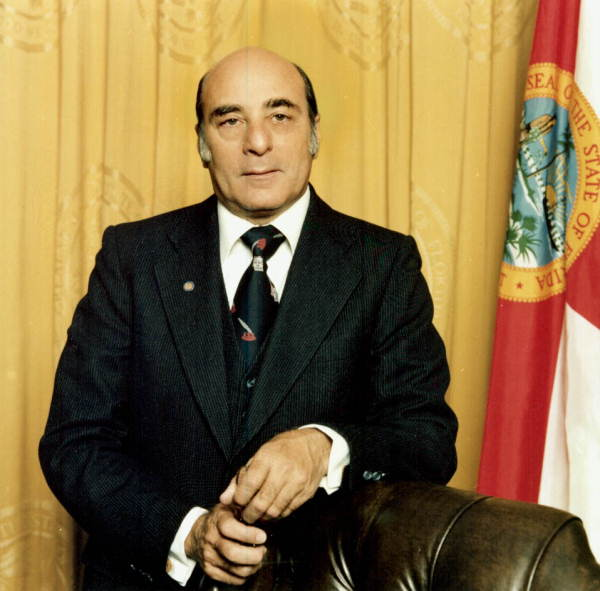

20th Secretary of State of Florida
- In office 1979 – August 5, 1987
- Governor: Bob Graham
- Preceded by: Jesse J. McCrary, Jr.
- Succeeded by: James C. Smith

Member of the Florida Senate
- In office 1972–1978

Member of the Florida House of Representatives
- In office 1966–1972
- Succeeded by: Carey Matthews

Personal details
- Born: May 13, 1931 New York City, New York, U.S.
- Died: March 2, 2012 (aged 80) Hollywood, Florida, U.S.
- Party: Democratic

Military service
- Branch/service: United States Army

George Firestone (May 13, 1931 – March 2, 2012) was an American politician and businessman from the U.S. state of Florida. A Democrat, he served as the 20th Florida Secretary of State from 1979 to 1987.

== Early life ==
Firestone was born in New York City in 1931. He moved to Miami, Florida with his family as a child in 1936. Firestone served in the United States Army and was honorably discharged in 1952.

== Career ==
After leaving the Army, Firestone returned to Miami, where he established a security firm and cleaning business.

Firestone was elected to the Florida House of Representatives from Dade and Monroe counties in 1966. He was elected to the Florida Senate in 1972, where he served until 1978. He was elected Secretary of State of Florida in 1978 and was reelected twice, serving until he resigned on August 5, 1987.

He used the Secretary of State's position as chief cultural officer to promoted the arts, He also helped update the Florida seal to include the sabal palm. During his tenure, he also traveled a great deal to promote foreign investment in Florida, and was a supporter for Free Trade Zones in the state.

== Personal life ==
Later in life, he was diagnosed with Alzheimer's disease. On March 2, 2012, he died in a Hollywood, Florida assisted living facility at the age of 80.

Party political offices
Preceded by Bruce Smathers	Democratic nominee for Secretary of State of Florida; 1978, 1982, 1986	Succeeded by Tom R. Moore
Political offices
Preceded by Jesse J. McCrary, Jr.	Secretary of State of Florida; 1979–1987	Succeeded by James C. Smith
