= Florida Cabinet =

Body of the Florida state government

The Florida Cabinet is a body of the government of Florida comprising the attorney general, the commissioner of agriculture, and the chief financial officer that engages in the collective governance of the state.

== History ==
Created following Reconstruction, when there had been a widespread distrust of the governors appointed by the federal government, the cabinet was originally designed to decentralize authority from the governor. Thus, until January 7, 2003, Florida was unique among states in that its cabinet consisted of six independently elected members who each held an equal vote with the state governor in executive decisions. The original Cabinet positions were:

- Attorney General
- Commissioner of Agriculture
- Commissioner of Education
- Comptroller
- Secretary of State
- Treasurer/Insurance Commissioner/Fire Marshal

In 1998, Florida voters voted to amend the Florida Constitution to shrink the Cabinet to its current three members. This amendment took effect in 2003, following the 2002 election. Under the reforms adopted, the secretary of state and education commissioner became appointed officials under the governor who would oversee their respective agencies, while the positions of the comptroller and the treasurer/insurance commissioner/fire marshal were combined into the new position of the chief financial officer of Florida. The Cabinet also lost its control over the Florida Department of Education: management of K–12 education and community college education which was shifted to the new Florida Board of Education and management of the State University System of Florida to the new Florida Board of Governors. Some environmental policy powers of the Cabinet were shifted to other officials as well. The reforms were seen as ways to strengthen the power of the governor.

== Composition ==
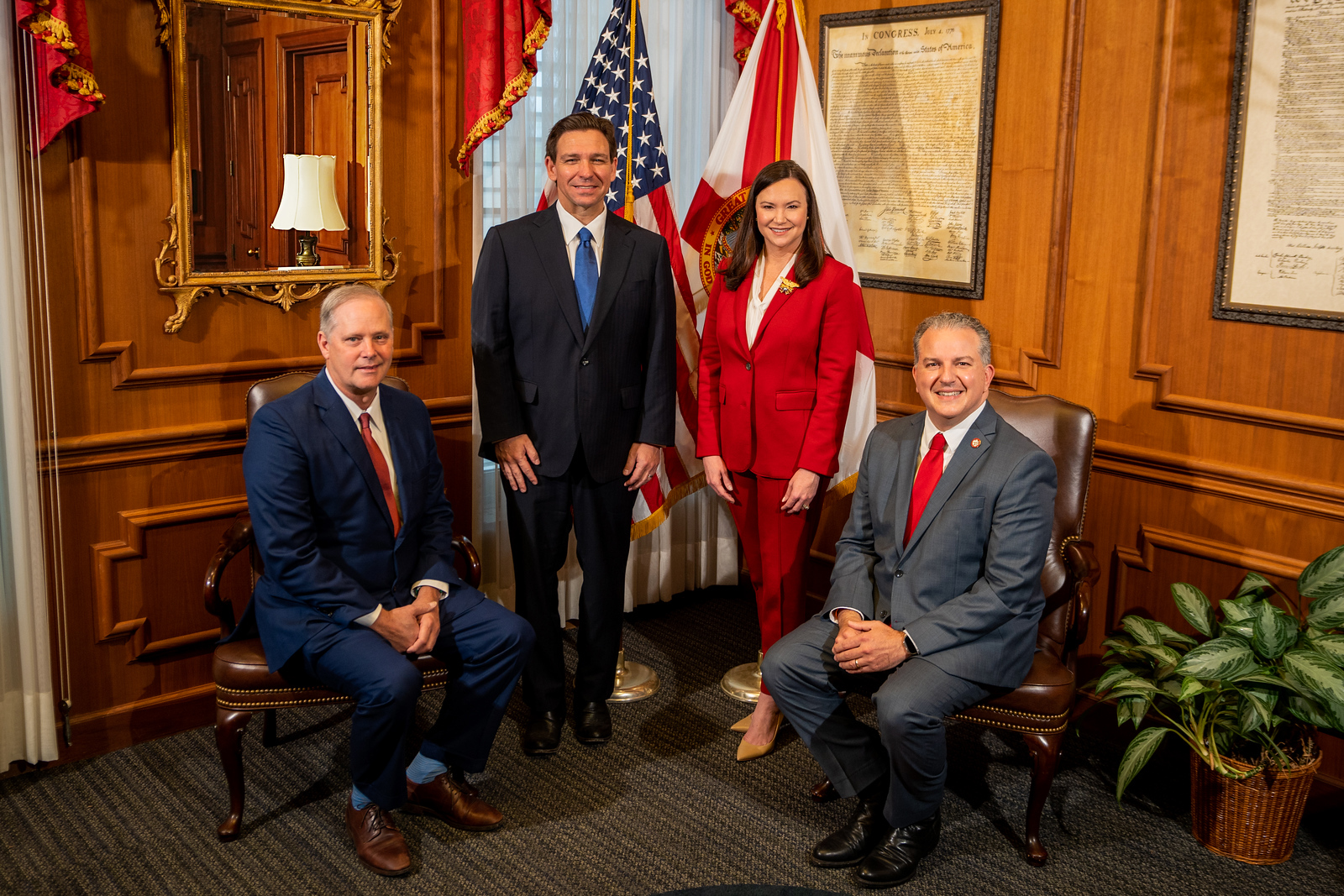
The Florida Cabinet in 2023

The meetings of the Cabinet are chaired by the governor, currently Ron DeSantis, and include these officers:

- Chief Financial Officer Blaise Ingoglia
- Attorney General James Uthmeier
- Commissioner of Agriculture Wilton Simpson

Each member is popularly elected statewide and carries one vote in executive decisions. In the case of a tie, the vote cast by the governor decides the outcome.

== Agencies ==
The governor and Cabinet serves as the board of directors of several state agencies and during their bi-weekly meetings discuss agency business and make policy decisions for the agencies. The governor and Cabinet, all statewide officials, also oversee the separate offices and agencies under their departments. The governor and Cabinet oversees the following agencies:

- State Board of Executive Clemency
- State Board of Administration (excluding the commissioner of agriculture)
- Division of Bond Finance
- Department of Veterans' Affairs
- Department of Highway Safety and Motor Vehicles
- Department of Law Enforcement
- Department of Revenue
- Administration Commission
- Florida Land and Water Adjudicatory Commission
- Electrical Power Plant and Transmission Line Siting Board
- The Board of Trustees Internal Improvement Trust Fund
- Financial Services Commission

== Aides ==
The governor and each member of the Cabinet has an office dedicated to Cabinet affairs. These offices are headed by a chief Cabinet aide, who is assisted by other aides. The week prior to a Cabinet meeting, the Cabinet aides meet to discuss the agenda and to conduct preliminary discussions on a variety of issues slated to come before the full Cabinet. Cabinet aides' meetings are considered an important part of the Cabinet process.

== See also ==
- Constitution of Florida
- Florida Democratic Party
- Governor of Florida
- Republican Party of Florida
