= 1863 Confederate States House of Representatives elections in Florida =

Confederate States House of Representatives elections in Florida, 1863
- November 4, 1863

Both of Florida's seats to the Confederate States House of Representatives
| | Majority party |
|---|---|
| Party | Independent |
| Seats won | 2 (Note: While the Confederate States of America did not have formal political parties, most members of the Confederate Congress were previously affiliated with the Democratic Party before secession.) |
| Seat change | Steady |
| Popular vote | 0 (Note: Both candidates ran unopposed. As such, no ballots were counted for this election.) |
| Percentage | 100.00% |

The 1863 Confederate States House of Representatives election in Florida was held on Wednesday, November 4, 1863, to elect the two Confederate States Representatives from the state of Florida, one from each of the state's congressional districts, to represent Florida in the 2nd Confederate States Congress. The election coincided with the elections of other offices, including various state and local elections.

The winning candidate would serve a two-year term in the Confederate States House of Representatives from May 2, 1864, to May 1, 1866.

== Background ==
Florida seceded from the Union on January 10, 1861, and joined the Confederate States of America. In the 1861 elections, James Baird Dawkins was elected as the C.S. representative for the 1st district, while Robert Benjamin Hilton was elected the C.S. representative for the 2nd district.

Dawkins resigned from Congress on December 8, 1862, with John Marshall Martin winning the 1863 special election to succeed him. Martin did not run for a full term, deciding he was too young to be effective in Congress, opting instead to become an officer in the 9th Florida Infantry in the Army of Northern Virginia.

The candidates for both districts ran unopposed, and their ballots cast for them were not tallied on official results.

== District 1 ==
=== Candidates ===
- Samuel St. George Rogers, former state senator

=== General election ===
==== Results ====
Florida's 1st congressional district election, 1863
| Party | Candidate | Votes | % |
|---|---|---|---|
| Independent | Samuel St. George Rogers | Unopposed | 100.00% |
| Turnout | | — | — |

== District 2 ==
=== Candidates ===
- Robert Benjamin Hilton, incumbent C.S. representative

=== General election ===
==== Results ====
Florida's 2nd congressional district election, 1863
| Party | Candidate | Votes | % |
|---|---|---|---|
| Democratic | Robert Benjamin Hilton | Unopposed | 100.00% |
| Turnout | | — | — |

== Aftermath ==
The Confederate States Congress adjourned for the final time on March 18, 1865, and was officially dissolved on May 5, 1865.

== See also ==
- Confederate States House of Representatives elections, 1863
- 1865 United States House of Representatives election in Florida
