= 1861 Confederate States House of Representatives elections in Florida =

Confederate States House of Representatives elections in Florida, 1861
- November 6, 1861

Both of Florida's seats to the Confederate States House of Representatives
	Majority party
Party	Independent
Seats won	2 (Note: While the Confederate States of America did not have formal political parties, most members of the Confederate Congress were previously affiliated with the Democratic Party before secession.)
Seat change	▲2
Popular vote	8,365
Percentage	100%
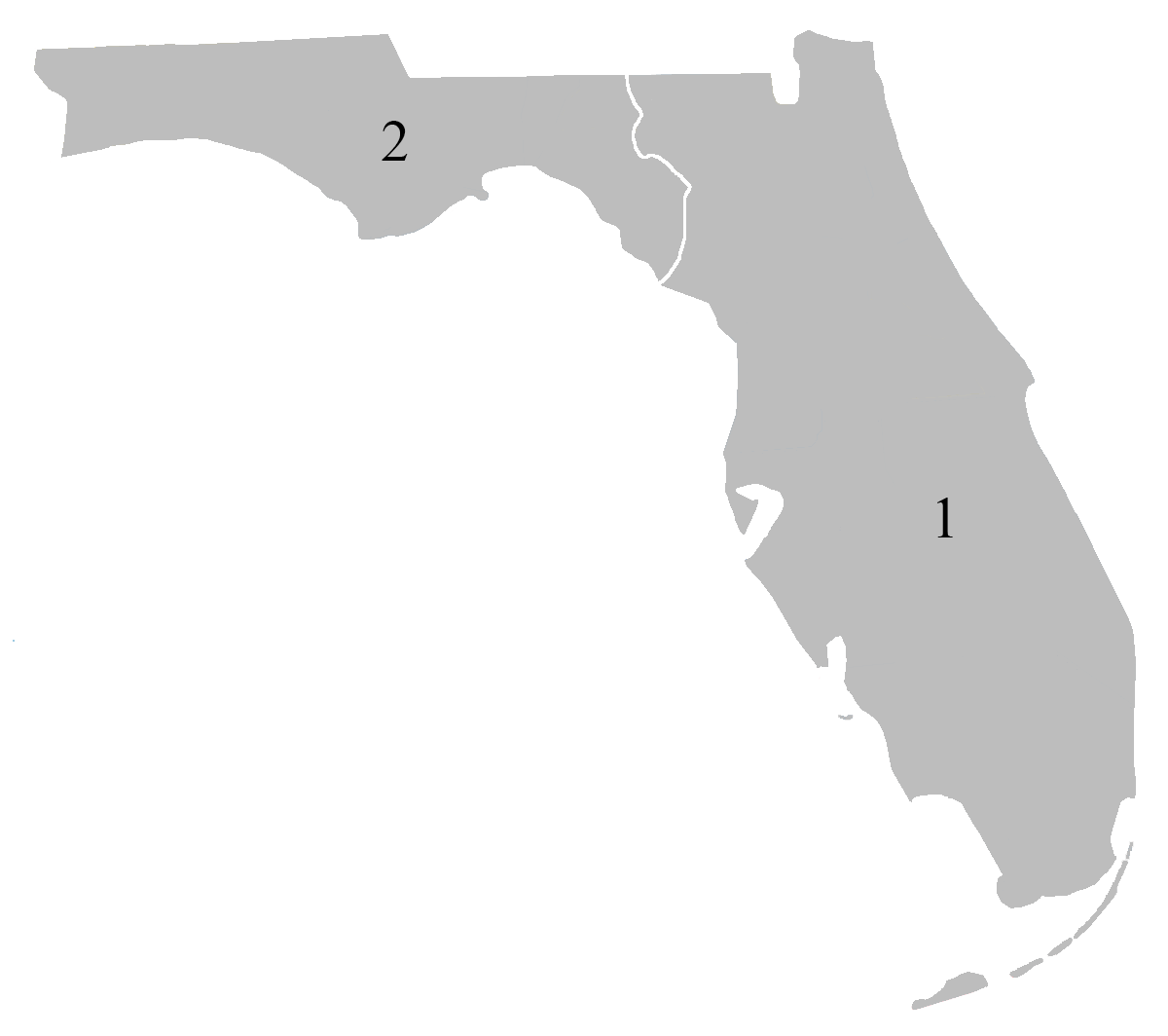

The 1861 Confederate States House of Representatives election in Florida was held on Wednesday, November 6, 1861, to elect the two Confederate States Representatives from the state of Florida, one from each of the state's congressional districts, to represent Florida in the 1st Confederate States Congress. The election coincided with the elections of other offices, including the Confederate States presidential election and various state and local elections.

The winning candidate would serve a two-year term in the Confederate States House of Representatives from February 18, 1862, to February 17, 1864.

== Background ==
Florida seceded from the Union on January 10, 1861, and joined the Confederate States of America. The state appointed five delegates to the Provisional Confederate Congress, to serve in interim until the Congress first convened on February 18, 1862.

== District 1 ==
=== Candidates ===
- Antonio A. Canova, state representative
- James M. Commander, former U.S. Army general
- James Baird Dawkins, former U.S. attorney for the U.S. Circuit Court for the Eastern District of Florida
- Philip Dell, former president of the Florida Senate

=== General election ===
==== Results ====
Florida's 1st congressional district election, 1861
Party	Candidate	Votes	%	±%
Independent	James Baird Dawkins	1,462	36.07%	N/A
Independent	Philip Dell	1,050	25.91%	N/A
Independent	Antonio A. Canova	980	24.18%	N/A
Independent	James M. Commander	561	13.84%	N/A
Majority		412	10.17%	N/A
Turnout		4,053	100%	

=== Aftermath ===
Dawkins resigned from Congress on December 9, 1862, following his appointment to a state court by Governor John Milton. The special election to replace him was won by John Marshall Martin.

== District 2 ==
=== Candidates ===
- Frederick R. Cotton, planter
- Robert Benjamin Hilton, former U.S. representative-elect
- James L. Mosely, former North Carolina state representative
- John Tanner, former Orange County commissioner
- Frederick L. Villepigue, secretary of state of Florida

=== General election ===
==== Results ====
Florida's 2nd congressional district election, 1861
Party	Candidate	Votes	%	±%
Independent	Robert Benjamin Hilton	1,668	38.68%	N/A
Independent	James L. Mosely	937	21.73%	N/A
Independent	Frederick R. Cotton	774	17.95%	N/A
Independent	John Tanner	497	11.53%	N/A
Independent	Frederick L. Villepigue	436	10.11%	N/A
Majority		731	16.95%	N/A
Turnout		4,312	100%	

== See also ==
- Confederate States House of Representatives elections, 1861
