= Benjamin F. Allen =

Florida politician

5th Secretary of State of Florida
- In office January 13, 1863 – July 4, 1868
- Governor: John Milton; Abraham K. Allison; William Marvin; David S. Walker
- Preceded by: Frederick L. Villepigue
- Succeeded by: George J. Alden

Member of the Florida House of Representatives from the Leon district
- In office 1862–1863

Member of the Florida House of Representatives
- In office 1850–1851

Personal details
- Born: February 15, 1815 Tennessee
- Died: November 5, 1876 (aged 62) Hot Springs, Arkansas
- Party: Democratic (after 1860)
- Other political affiliations: Whig Party (before 1856); Opposition Party (1856-1860)
- Education: University of Virginia

Military service
- Allegiance: Confederate States
- Branch/service: Confederate States Army
- Years of service: 1861–1863
- Rank: Private
- Unit: Dyke's Light Artillery Company
- Battles/wars: American Civil War

Benjamin Frederick Allen (February 15, 1815 – November 5, 1876) was an American lawyer and politician in the state of Florida. Allen served as the 5th Secretary of State of Florida.

== Early career ==
Allen was born in Tennessee on February 15, 1815. His brother, Richard C. Allen, moved to St. Joseph, Florida by 1825, and became a prominent local politician, serving in the 1838 Florida Constitutional Convention and as a federal district judge in nearby Apalachicola, Florida.

Allen attended the University of Virginia from 1839 to 1840, and moved to Tallahassee, Florida after graduation to take care of his brother, who died shortly after.

Allen took occupation as a local lawyer, and was elected to represent Leon County in the Florida House of Representatives for one term, serving from 1850 to 1851. In 1855, Allen was appointed as the printer for the Florida Senate. Allen later served as the editor for the influential Whig Party newspaper the Florida Sentinel, serving in this position from 1856 to 1858.

Allen ran as the Opposition Party candidate in the 1860 United States House of Representatives election for Florida's at-large congressional district, losing to clerk of the Florida House of Representatives Robert Benjamin Hilton, receiving only 40% of the vote compared to Hilton's 60%.

== American Civil War and Reconstruction ==
At the outbreak of the American Civil War, Allen sided with the Confederacy and joined the Confederate States Army in 1861, serving as a private in Dyke's Light Artillery Company under the command of Captain Charles Dyke. Dyke's Light Artillery was tasked with the defense of Tallahassee, which was far from the frontlines of the war. Due to this free time, Allen was again elected to the Florida House of Representatives to represent Leon County.

Allen was mustered out of the army on January 13, 1863, following his appointment as Secretary of State of Florida after the resignation of Frederick L. Villepigue, who resigned in order to take captaincy of the Kilcrease Light Artillery. In this position, Allen oversaw the transition of Florida into Reconstruction, and, along with Governor David S. Walker and other state officials, signed off on the resolution recognizing the Thirteenth Amendment to the United States Constitution. Allen served as secretary of state until July 4, 1868, when he was succeeded by George J. Alden after an election.

== Death ==
Allen died in Hot Springs, Arkansas. He's buried at Elmwood Cemetery in Memphis.

== Notes ==
Political offices
Preceded by Frederick L. Villepigue	Secretary of State of Florida; 1863–1868	Succeeded by George J. Alden
