= 1860 United States House of Representatives election in Florida =

- October 1, 1860
Nominee	Robert Benjamin Hilton	Benjamin F. Allen
Party	Democratic	Opposition
Popular vote	7,722	5,172
Percentage	59.89%	40.11%
County Results
Hilton
50–60%
60–70%
70–80%
80–90%
>90%
Allen
50–60%
60–70%
No Vote
Representative before election
George Sydney Hawkins
Democratic
Elected Representative
Robert Benjamin
Hilton
Democratic

The 1860 United States House of Representatives election in Florida was held on Monday, October 1, 1860, to elect the single United States Representative from the state of Florida, one from the state's single at-large congressional district, to represent Florida in the 37th Congress. The election coincided with the gubernatorial election and various state and local elections.

Democratic nominee Robert Benjamin Hilton defeated Opposition nominee Benjamin F. Allen. Hilton was never seated in Congress, however, as Florida had succeeded from the Union before Congress convened.

== Candidates ==
=== Democratic ===
==== Nominee ====
- Robert Benjamin Hilton, clerk of the Florida House of Representatives

==== Eliminated at party convention ====
- William Dilworth, former state representative
- James Gettis, former state representative
- Barton C. Pope, former state representative
- J. Carraway Smith, former state representative
- Frederick L. Villepigue, secretary of state of Florida
- C. C. Younge, lawyer

=== Opposition ===
==== Nominee ====
- Benjamin F. Allen, former state representative

== Campaign ==
By 1860, the secession of the South from the Union was nearly inevitable. Both Hilton and Allen were secessionists; the only question that remained was what ideology would an independent Florida prefer: the conservatism of the Democratic Party or the Whiggism of the Opposition Party. Due to Hilton's close ties with Vice President John C. Breckinridge, the Democratic nominee for president, it was all but guaranteed that he would ride on Breckinridge's coattails.

== General election ==
=== Results ===
Florida's at-large congressional district election, 1860
Party	Candidate	Votes	%	±%
Democratic	Robert Benjamin Hilton	7,722	59.89%	−2.54%
Opposition	Benjamin F. Allen	5,172	40.11%	N/A
Majority		2,550	19.78%	−5.08%
Turnout		12,894	100.00%	
Democratic hold				

=== Results by County ===
County	Robert Benjamin Hilton Democratic		Benjamin F. Allen Opposition		Total votes
County	#	%	#	%	Total votes
Alachua	516	74.67%	175	25.33%	691
Brevard	0	0%	0	0%	0
Calhoun	88	88.0%	12	12.0%	100
Clay	85	43.59%	110	51.73%	195
Columbia	237	48.27%	254	51.73%	491
Dade	0	0%	0	0%	0
Duval	263	53.46%	229	46.54%	492
Escambia	173	30.73%	390	69.27%	563
Franklin	155	85.16%	27	14.84%	182
Gadsden	387	48.99%	403	51.01%	790
Hamilton	247	58.39%	176	41.61%	423
Hernando	216	72.0%	84	28.0%	300
Hillsborough	347	90.36%	37	9.64%	384
Holmes	75	46.88%	85	53.13%	160
Jackson	511	51.88%	474	48.12%	985
Jefferson	450	74.38%	155	25.62%	605
Lafayette	110	55.56%	88	44.44%	198
Leon	427	56.26%	332	43.74%	759
Levy	181	69.35%	80	30.65%	261
Liberty	93	51.38%	88	48.62%	181
Madison	422	64.53%	232	35.47%	654
Manatee	79	94.05%	5	5.95%	84
Marion	435	73.36%	158	26.64%	593
Monroe	156	78.0%	44	22.0%	200
Nassau	252	81.82%	56	18.18%	308
New River	211	61.34%	133	38.66%	344
Orange	58	36.02%	103	63.98%	161
Putnam	162	63.28%	94	36.72%	256
Santa Rosa	251	44.27%	316	55.73%	567
St. Johns	202	67.79%	96	32.21%	298
Sumter	108	59.67%	73	40.33%	181
Suwannee	135	49.63%	137	50.37%	272
Taylor	86	50.59%	84	49.41%	170
Volusia	49	69.01%	22	30.99%	71
Wakulla	173	54.75%	143	45.25%	316
Walton	210	51.98%	194	48.02%	404
Washington	172	67.45%	83	32.55%	255
Totals	7,722	59.89%	5,172	40.11%	12,894

== Aftermath ==
Florida seceded from the Union on January 10, 1861, meaning Hilton was not able to take his seat in Congress. However, Hilton won election to the Confederate States House of Representatives later in 1861, representing Florida's 2nd congressional district.

== See also ==
- 1860 United States presidential election in Florida
- United States House of Representatives elections, 1860
- 1860 Florida Gubernatorial election
- 1861 Confederate States House of Representatives elections in Florida
