= 1863 Florida's 1st congressional district special election =

1863 Florida's 2nd congressional district special election
- February 2, 1863
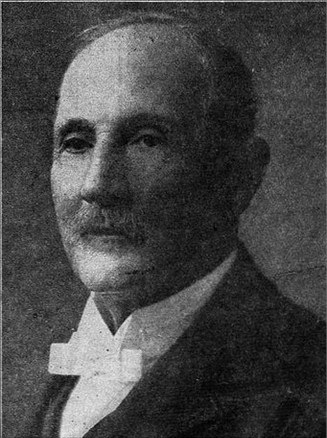

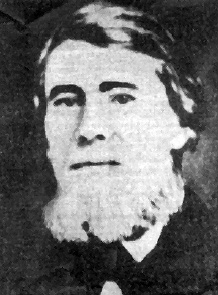

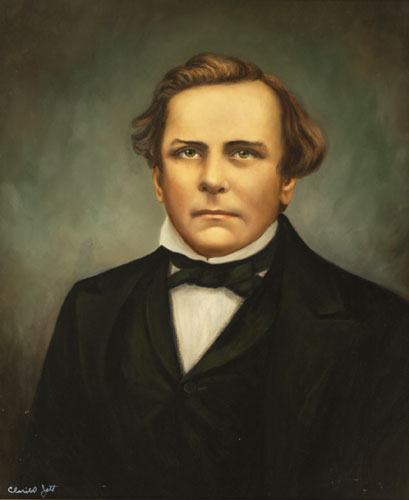
Nominee	John Marshall Martin	James Gettis
Party	Independent	Independent
Popular vote	1,111	583
Percentage	38.78%	20.35%
Nominee	W. M. Ives	James E. Broome
Party	Independent	Independent
Popular vote	571	486
Percentage	19.93%	16.96%
Representative before election
James Baird Dawkins
Independent
Elected Representative
John Marshall
Martin
Independent

A special election to the Confederate States House of Representatives for Florida's 1st congressional district was held February 2, 1863.

The winning candidate would serve the remainder of a two-year term in the Confederate States House of Representatives to represent Florida in the 1st Confederate Congress from February 3, 1863, to February 18, 1864.

== Background ==
In the 1861 congressional election, James Baird Dawkins was elected to the Confederate States House of Representatives. However, Dawkins resigned on December 8, 1862, after Governor John Milton appointed him as a state judge.

== Candidates ==
- James E. Broome, state senator and former governor of Florida
- James Gettis, former state representative
- George E. Hawes, former state senator
- W. M. Ives, editor of the Lake City Columbian
- John Marshall Martin, planter

== Campaign ==
Unique to this election, none of the five candidates came from West Florida, which had been the state's political powerhouse, showing the waning influence of Pensacola. Martin and Ives were both from North Central Florida; Martin was a planter and Confederate States Army captain from Ocala, while Ives was an influential newspaper editor from Lake City. Broome, the former governor of Florida, was from Tallahassee. Gettis, a former state representative from Tampa, was famous in Florida for his actions during the Battle of Tampa. The only candidate out of the five without a major reputation in the state was Hawes, a former state senator from Orlando, which was still a small frontier town at this time.

== General election ==
=== Results ===
1863 Florida's 1st congressional district special election
Party	Candidate	Votes	%	±%
Independent	John Marshall Martin	1,111	38.78%	N/A
Independent	James Gettis	583	20.35%	N/A
Independent	W. M. Ives	571	19.93%	N/A
Independent	James E. Broome	486	16.96%	N/A
Independent	George E. Hawes	114	3.98%	N/A
Majority		528	18.43%	+8.26%
Turnout		4,053	100.00%	

== See also ==
- 1861 Confederate States House of Representatives elections
- 1863 Confederate States House of Representatives elections
