= Samuel Barron Stephens =

Florida politician (1814–1882)

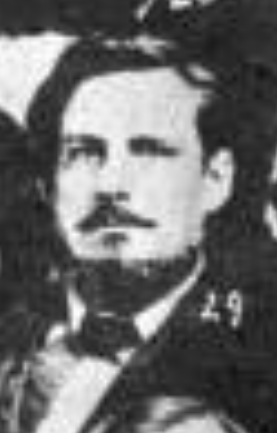

Member of the Florida House of Representatives from the Gadsden district
- In office 1848

Member of the Florida Territorial Council from the Gadsden district
- In office 1841–1842

Personal details
- Born: 1814 New Bern, North Carolina, US
- Died: August 4, 1882 (aged 67–68) Quincy, Florida, US
- Party: Whig
- Spouse: Caroline Booth
- Children: 2
- Education: University of North Carolina at Chapel Hill

Military service
- Allegiance: United States; Confederate States
- Branch/service: United States Army; Confederate States Army
- Years of service: 1836–1838 (USA); 1865 (CSA)
- Rank: 1st Lieutenant (USA); Colonel (CSA)
- Unit: Florida Militia
- Battles/wars: Second Seminole War; American Civil War: Battle of Natural Bridge

Samuel Barron Stephens (1814 – August 4, 1882) was an American attorney and politician from the state of Florida.

== Biography ==
Stephens was born in New Bern, North Carolina, in 1814. After graduating from the University of North Carolina at Chapel Hill in 1832, Stephens and his family settled in the newly established Florida Territory due to personal debts held by his father, Marcus Cicero Stephens, settling in Gadsden County. Stephens established a successful law practice in Quincy, Florida, and soon became both the city attorney and county attorney.

In 1836, Stephens was mustered into the 1st brigade of the Florida Militia at Marianna, Florida, during the Second Seminole War, serving as a first lieutenant and company captain. Stephens' company was mustered out of service in 1838.

Stephens was a delegate at the Florida Constitutional Convention of 1838, and assisted in the writing of Florida's first constitution. A member of the Whig Party, Stephens was elected to the Florida Territorial Council in 1841, representing Gadsden County. He served until 1842. In 1848, he was elected to the Florida State House of Representatives, serving only one term.

In 1849, he was appointed by the Florida House of Representatives to be the solicitor for Florida's Middle Judicial Circuit Court, defeating Madison County attorney Barton C. Pope in the nomination vote.

In 1861, Stephens sat as a member of the Florida Secession Convention. Stephens, who owned 24 slaves at the time, voted for Florida's secession from the Union. He was also a signatory of the Florida Ordinance of Secession.

Stephens served in the Confederate States Army during the American Civil War, and participated in the Battle of Natural Bridge in 1865. A lieutenant at Natural Bridge, Stephens was promoted to colonel by the end of the war.

Stephens was also a prominent Freemason, serving as the Grand Master of the Grand Lodge of Florida in 1869, making him the highest ranking Mason in Florida at the time.

Stephens died on August 4, 1882, in Quincy.

== Personal life ==
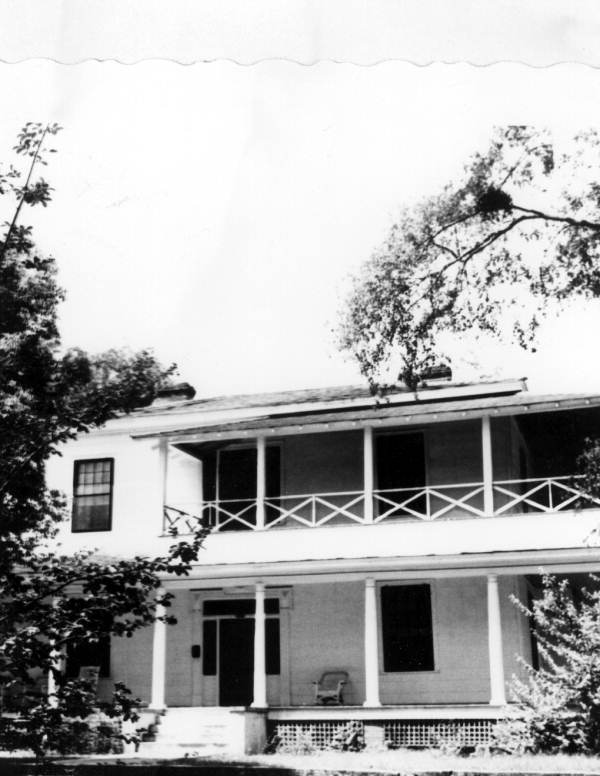
Stephens' home in Quincy, photographed in 1955.

Stephens's wife was Caroline Booth, a descendant of William Fitzgerald, a captain in the American Revolutionary War. They had two daughters, Fannie and Caroline.

Stephens was closely related with the Kenan political family of North Carolina, and was a maternal descendant of James Barron, a commodore in the United States Navy and commander of the USS Chesapeake during the Chesapeake–Leopard affair in 1807.

Stephens's house in Quincy, the Colonel Samuel B. Stephens House, which was built between 1842 and 1850, is listed as one of Quincy's historic homes.
