= Charles Downing =

American politician

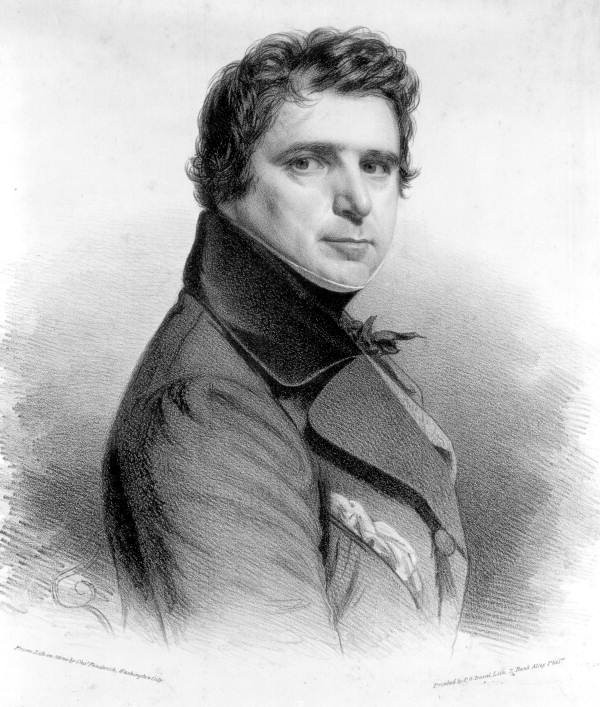

Delegate to the U.S. House of Representatives from the Florida Territory
- In office March 4, 1837 – March 3, 1841
- Preceded by: Joseph M. White
- Succeeded by: David Levy Yulee

Member of the Legislative Council of the Territory of Florida from Mosquito County
- In office 1835–1838
- Preceded by: Joseph L. Smith
- Succeeded by: William Henry Brockenbrough

Personal details
- Born: Virginia
- Died: Oct. 24, 1841 St. Augustine, Florida
- Party: Democratic
- Children: Charles W. Downing, Jr.
- Occupation: lawyer

Charles Downing (died October 24, 1841) was a 19th-century American lawyer who served as a Delegate to the U.S. House of Representatives for two terms from the Florida Territory from 1837 to 1841.

== Biography ==
He was born in Virginia, although it is unknown when. In his life, Downing studied law, and after being admitted to The Florida Bar, he practiced in St. Augustine, Florida.

=== Political career ===
Initially, a member of the Legislative Council of the Territory of Florida, Downing was then elected to the Twenty-fifth United States Congress, and took office on March 4, 1837. Two years later, he was re-elected to the Twenty-sixth United States Congress, and his term ended on March 3, 1841.

=== Death ===
In 1841 Charles Downing died in St. Augustine, Florida.

His son, Charles W. Downing, Jr., was Secretary of State of Florida.

== Sources ==
- United States Congress. "Charles Downing (id: D000472)". Biographical Directory of the United States Congress.

Political offices
Preceded by Joseph M. White	Delegate to the U.S. House of Representatives from Florida Territory; March 4, 1837 – March 3, 1841	Succeeded by David Levy Yulee
