= Barton C. Pope =

Florida state representative

Member of the Florida House of Representatives from the Madison district
- In office 1854–1855

Personal details
- Born: 1813 Georgia, U.S.
- Died: after April 5, 1862 (aged at least 49)
- Party: Democratic
- Spouse: Fanny
- Children: 5, including Frank

Military service
- Allegiance: Confederate States
- Branch/service: Confederate States Army
- Years of service: 1861–1862
- Rank: Private
- Unit: 1st Florida Infantry
- Battles/wars: American Civil War

Barton C. Pope (1813 – after April 5, 1862) was an American lawyer and politician from the state of Florida.

== Life ==
Pope was born in Georgia in 1813 or 1814. Pope moved to the Florida Territory sometime between 1827 and 1844. In 1844, he purchased 200 acres of land from Henry Sapp in Madison County, Florida.

Pope became a prominent a lawyer in Madison County. In 1849, he was nominated by state senator William P. Moseley of Madison County to be the solicitor for Florida's Middle Judicial Circuit Court; however, Pope lost the nomination vote to former state representative Samuel B. Stephens of Gadsden County.

He was also a Freemason, becoming a high-ranking member of the Madison County's Masonic lodge, serving as Grand Orator in 1851 and as the Lodge Master from 1853 to 1855.

In 1854, Pope was elected to represent Madison County as a Democrat in the Florida House of Representatives, serving until 1855.

Pope was a candidate for the Democratic nomination in the 1860 United States House of Representatives election in Florida for Florida's at-large congressional district. Though he was the early frontrunner for the nomination, he was defeated on the 12th ballot at the party convention by Robert Benjamin Hilton, the clerk of the Florida House of Representatives.

At the outbreak of the American Civil War, Pope enlisted in the Confederate States Army as a private, joining Company F of the 1st Florida Infantry Regiment on April 4, 1861 for a 12-month service. He was mustered out at the same rank on April 5, 1862. It is from this point that Pope disappears from the historical record.

== Family ==
Pope had a brother named W. Henry Pope who represented Jackson County, Florida in the Florida House of Representatives in 1856.

Pope was married to a woman named Fanny, who was 10 years his junior. They had at least five children: four sons named Clifford (born 1844 or 1845), Frank, Hunter, and Randall (latter three were born after 1850); as well as a daughter named Anna (born 1846 or 1847).

Frank, Hunter, and Randall Pope all became prominent attorneys. Frank later became a Florida state senator while Hunter was murdered by a family friend, John Cason, following a dispute regarding a billiards game.
