= Abraham K. Allison =

American businessman and politician (1814–1893)

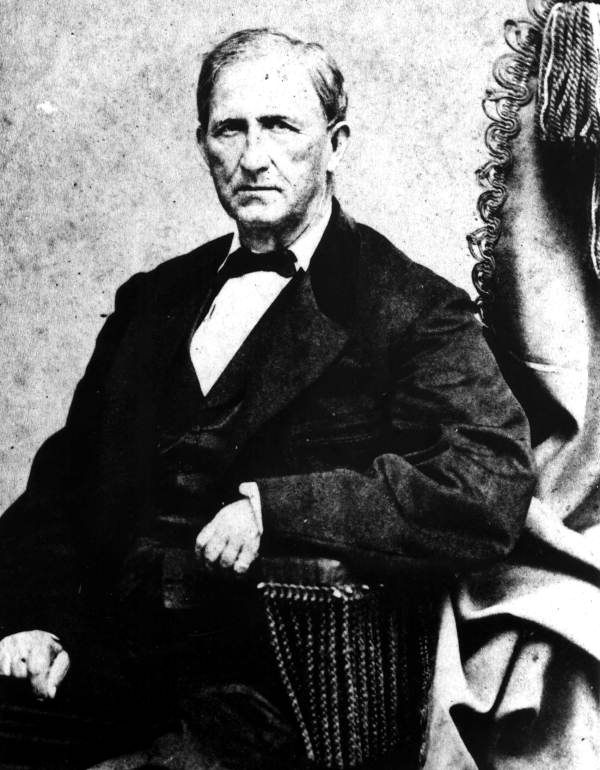

6th Governor of Florida
- In office April 1, 1865 – May 19, 1865
- Preceded by: John Milton
- Succeeded by: William Marvin

Member of the Florida House of Representatives
- In office 1845; 1847; 1852

Personal details
- Born: December 10, 1814 Jones County, Georgia, US
- Died: July 8, 1893 (aged 78) Quincy, Florida, US
- Party: Democratic
- Spouse(s): Mary Jane Nathans (1822–1850); Elizabeth Susan Coleman (1838–1895)

Abraham Kurkindolle Allison (December 10, 1814 – July 8, 1893) was an American businessman and politician. A member of the Democratic Party, he served in the Florida Territorial Legislature and the Florida State House of Representatives as well as briefly the sixth governor of Florida at the end of the American Civil War.

== Early life ==
Allison was born on December 10, 1814, in Jones County, Georgia, to Captain James and Sarah Fannin Allison. After he graduated from school, he worked as a merchant in Columbus, Georgia, and in Henry County, Alabama. He then moved to Apalachicola, Florida, where he served as the city's first mayor. He also served as the first county judge of Franklin County and as Clerk of the United States Court. He was a member of the Territorial Legislature. In the Seminole War, he was captain of the Franklin Rifles. He moved to Quincy, Gadsden County in 1839 and there commenced the practice of law.

In 1843, he built a Georgian colonial home in Quincy. In 1989 it became the Allison House Inn, a bed and breakfast.

== Early political career ==
He was again elected to the Territorial Legislature, and represented Gadsden County in the State Legislature in 1845, 1847 and 1852. As Speaker of the House, he assumed the duties of acting Governor on September 16, 1853, because both Governor Thomas Brown and Senate President R. J. Floyd were out of the state. He gave up the office on the inauguration of James E. Broome on October 3. Allison did not exercise executive powers and merely held himself in readiness should a need arise.

He was a member of the Constitutional Convention of 1861. He served during the Confederacy in the Florida State Senate from 1862 through 1864.

== Governorship and later life ==
Governor John Milton, an ardent Southern nationalist, killed himself on April 1, 1865, when the Confederate cause seemed doomed. Allison, as the state senate president, then assumed the office of governor. He resigned his office on May 19, 1865, and went into hiding the day before federal troops formally occupied Tallahassee. He was captured by Union forces on June 19, 1865, and held for several months at Fort Pulaski.

After his release, he returned to Quincy to practice law. During the election of 1870, Allison led a band of armed men to block black voters from the polls until they closed. This nearly eliminated the Republican majority in Gadsden County. In 1872, he was convicted of "intimidating Negroes" for this incident and jailed for six months and fined.

He died in Quincy, Florida, on July 8, 1893, aged 78.

== Notes ==
Political offices
Preceded by John Milton	Governor of Florida; April 1, 1865 – May 19, 1865	Succeeded by William Marvin
