= Senator Alden =

Senator Alden may refer to:

- George J. Alden (fl. 1860s), Florida State Senate
- Roy Alden (1863–1937), Illinois State Senate
