= George Alden =

George Alden may refer to:

- George I. Alden (1843–1926), American mechanical engineer and academic innovator
- George J. Alden (fl. 1860), Florida state senator
