= 1856 United States House of Representatives election in Florida =

- October 6, 1856
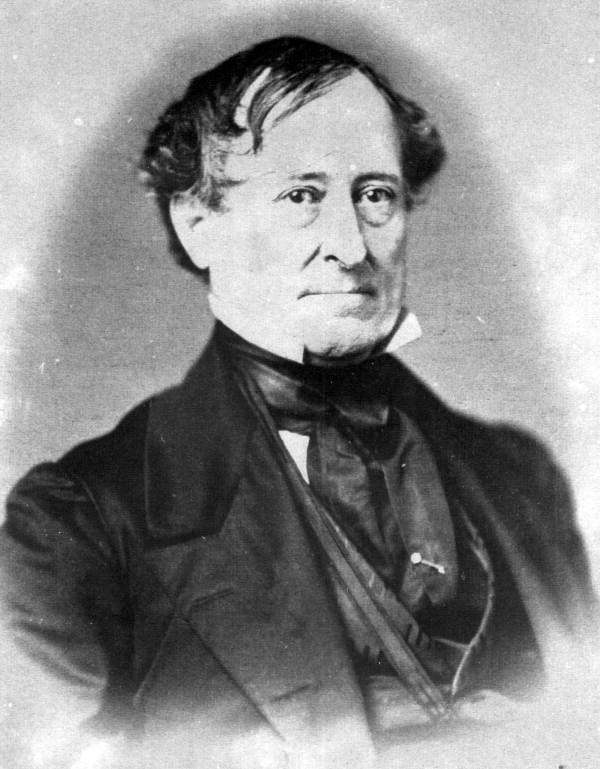

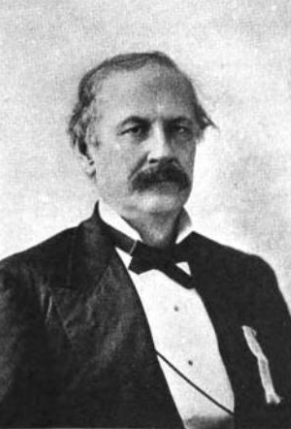
Nominee	George Sydney Hawkins	James McNair Baker
Party	Democratic	Know Nothing
Popular vote	6,392	5,650
Percentage	53.08%	46.92%
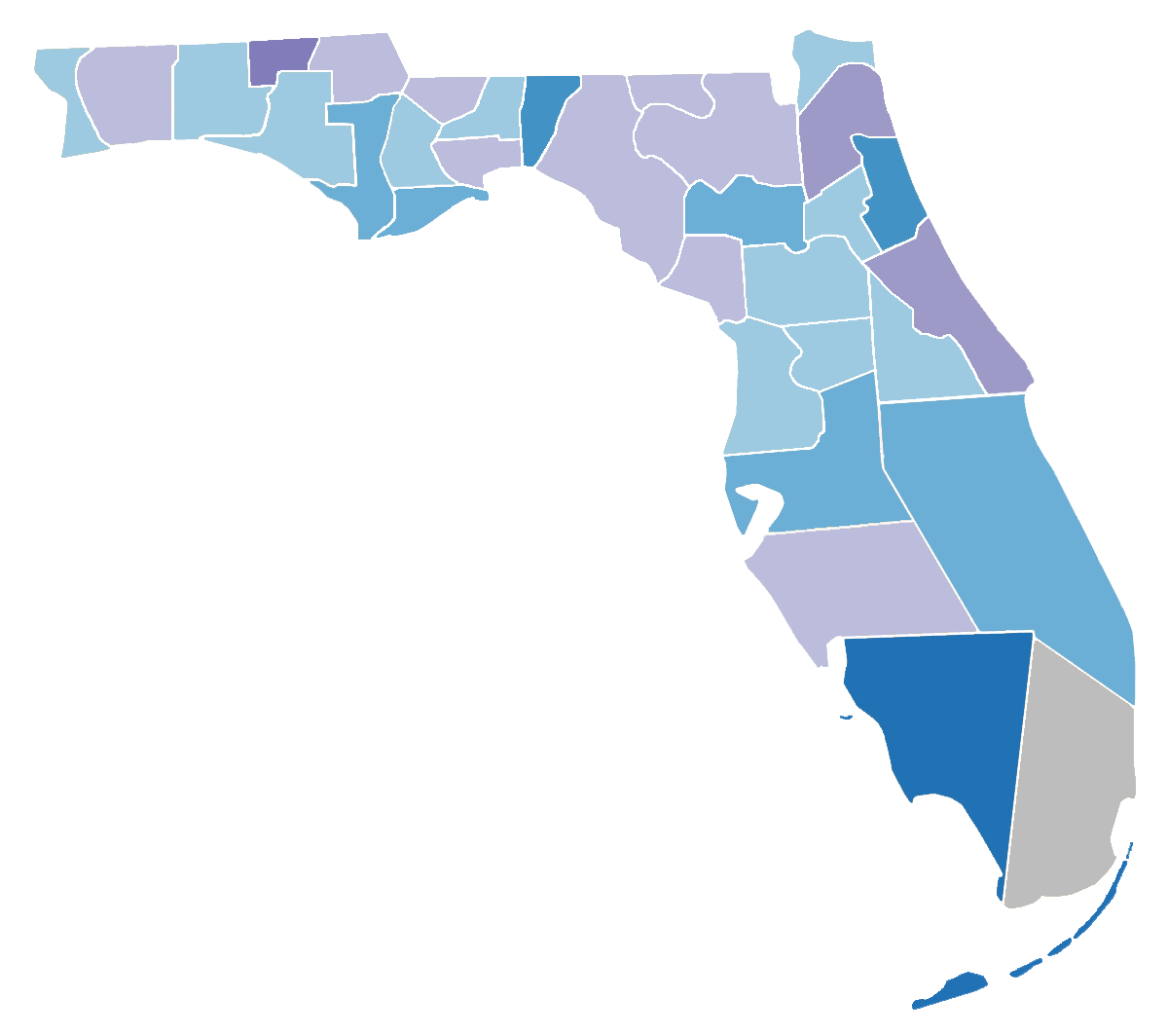
County Results
Hawkins
50–59%
60–69%
70–79%
80–89%
Baker
50–59%
60–69%
70–79%
No Votes
No Votes
Representative before election
Augustus Maxwell
Democratic
Elected Representative
George Sydney Hawkins
Democratic

The 1856 United States House of Representatives election in Florida was held on Monday, October 6, 1856, to elect the single United States Representative from the state of Florida, one from the state's single at-large congressional district, to represent Florida in the 35th Congress. The election coincided with the elections of other offices, including the presidential election, the senatorial election, the gubernatorial election, and various state and local elections.

The winning candidate would serve a two-year term in the United States House of Representatives from March 4, 1857, to March 4, 1859.

== Background ==
Florida's single seat in the House of Representatives had been held by the Democrats since 1852. In the 1854 election, the Democratic Party made key gains in the former Whig strongholds of Pensacola and Jacksonville. By 1856, the Whig Party had collapsed, and they were replaced in the South by the Know Nothing Party, also known as the American Party, which was serving as a successor to the prior Anti-Masonic Party.

== Candidates ==
=== Democratic ===
==== Nominee ====
- George Sydney Hawkins, federal judge for the Northern District of Florida and former associate justice of the Supreme Court of Florida

==== Withdrawn ====
- Frederick L. Villepigue, secretary of state of Florida

=== Know Nothing ===
==== Nominee ====
- James McNair Baker, state attorney for the Columbia County Circuit Court

== Campaign ==
Baker campaigned heavily alongside the Know Nothing candidates for president and governor, former President Millard Fillmore and former Tallahassee Mayor David S. Walker, respectively. However, Baker fell severely ill during the election and was not able to campaign properly for the last few months, instead relying on Walker to campaign for him. This put Baker, a political unknown, at a severe disadvantage to Hawkins, who was a popular judge throughout the state.

== General election ==
=== Results ===
Florida's at-large congressional district election, 1856
Party	Candidate	Votes	%	±%
Democratic	George Sydney Hawkins	6,392	53.08%	−2.18%
Know Nothing	James McNair Baker	5,650	46.92%	N/A
Majority		742	6.16%	−4.37%
Turnout		12,042	100.00%	
Democratic hold				

=== Results by County ===
County	George Sydney Hawkins Democratic		James McNair Baker Know Nothing		Total votes
County	#	%	#	%	Total votes
Alachua	337	63.83%	191	36.17%	528
Brevard	10	66.67%	5	33.33%	15
Calhoun	112	62.57%	67	37.43%	179
Columbia	419	45.05%	511	54.95%	930
Dade	0	0%	0	0%	0
Duval	268	35.26%	492	64.74%	760
Escambia	260	52.42%	236	47.58%	496
Franklin	178	67.17%	87	32.83%	265
Gadsden	385	49.23%	397	50.77%	782
Hamilton	195	48.03%	211	51.97%	406
Hernando	122	58.65%	86	41.35%	208
Hillsborough	316	67.09%	155	32.91%	471
Holmes	44	29.93%	103	70.07%	147
Jackson	414	47.48%	458	52.52%	872
Jefferson	374	71.37%	150	28.63%	524
Leon	438	56.88%	332	43.12%	770
Levy	57	44.53%	71	55.47%	128
Liberty	97	56.73%	74	43.27%	171
Madison	469	48.91%	490	51.09%	959
Manatee	24	42.11%	33	57.89%	57
Marion	361	58.13%	260	41.87%	621
Monroe	235	80.20%	58	19.80%	293
Nassau	106	53.54%	92	46.46%	198
Orange	51	52.58%	46	47.42%	97
Putnam	117	50.87%	113	49.13%	230
Santa Rosa	206	40.71%	300	59.29%	506
St. Johns	195	74.43%	67	25.57%	262
Sumter	93	58.13%	67	41.88%	160
Volusia	26	38.24%	42	61.76%	68
Wakulla	155	45.72%	184	54.28%	339
Walton	177	51.60%	166	48.40%	343
Washington	151	53.08%	106	46.92%	257
Totals	6,392	53.08%	5,650	46.92%	12,042

== See also ==
- 1856 United States presidential election in Florida
- United States House of Representatives elections, 1856
- 1856 Florida gubernatorial election
