= Marion Light Artillery =

The Marion Light Artillery was part of the Confederate Army from Marion County, Florida. Commanding officers included John Marshall Martin. It served as part of the Army of Tennessee.

Marion County was home to many residents who relocated from South Carolina in the 15 or so years prior to the American Civil War and was a hotbed of secessionist activity. Organizers petitioned the state to host the Florida Secession Convention.

When Martin was seriously wounded at the Battle of Richmond, Colonel S. St. George Rogers took command.

It was also commanded by Thomas J. Perry and Robert P. McCants.

== See also ==
- List of Florida Confederate Civil War units
