= 1860 Florida gubernatorial election =

1860 Florida Gubernatorial election
- October 1, 1860
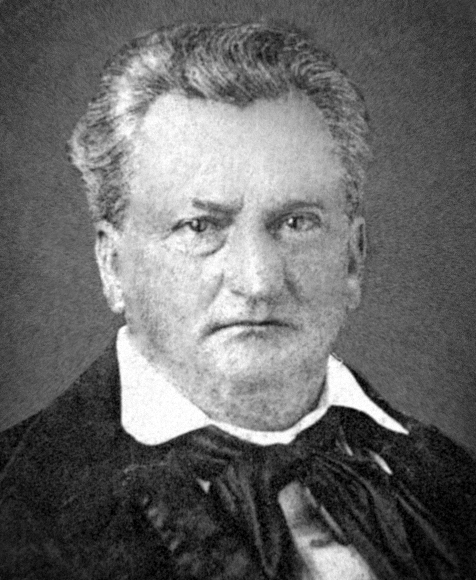

Nominee	John Milton	Edward D. Hopkins
Party	Democratic	Opposition
Popular vote	7,302	5,882
Percentage	55.39%	44.61%
County results
Milton
50–60%
60–70%
70–80%
80–90%
>90%
Hopkins
50–60%
60–70%
70–80%
Governor before election
Madison S. Perry
Democratic
Elected Governor
John Milton
Democratic

The 1860 Florida gubernatorial election was held on October 1, 1860. Democratic nominee John Milton defeated Opposition candidate Edward D. Hopkins.

== Candidates ==
=== Democratic ===
==== Nominee ====
- John Milton

==== Eliminated at party convention ====
- E. Blackburn
- Philip Dell
- John Finlayson
- George Whitfield

=== Opposition ===
==== Nominee ====
- Edward D. Hopkins

== General election ==
=== Results ===
Florida's gubernatorial election, 1860
Party	Candidate	Votes	%	±%
Democratic	John Milton	7,302	55.39%	+4.07
Opposition	Edward D. Hopkins	5,882	44.61%	N/A
Turnout		13,184	100.00%	
Democratic hold				

==== Results by county ====
County	John Milton Democratic		Edward D. Hopkins Opposition		Total votes
County	#	%	#	%	Total votes
Alachua	515	72.84%	192	27.16%	707
Brevard	13	76.47%	4	23.53%	17
Calhoun	80	80.0%	20	20.0%	100
Clay	67	32.68%	138	67.32%	205
Columbia	229	44.73%	283	55.27%	512
Dade	27	100.0%	0	0%	27
Duval	231	45.65%	275	54.35%	506
Escambia	153	27.82%	397	72.18%	550
Franklin	146	78.07%	41	21.93%	187
Gadsden	355	45.51%	425	54.49%	780
Hamilton	245	57.78%	179	42.22%	424
Hernando	212	70.90%	87	29.10%	299
Hillsborough	345	88.92%	43	11.08%	388
Holmes	90	52.19%	80	47.06%	170
Jackson	513	52.19%	470	47.81%	983
Jefferson	427	70.93%	175	29.07%	602
Lafayette	109	54.23%	92	45.77%	201
Leon	400	53.19%	352	46.81%	752
Levy	171	66.54%	86	33.46%	257
Liberty	73	42.44%	99	57.56%	172
Madison	237	35.91%	423	64.09%	660
Manatee	89	90.82%	9	9.18%	98
Marion	423	64.29%	235	35.71%	658
Monroe	154	77.39%	45	22.61%	199
Nassau	260	78.55%	71	21.45%	331
New River	172	43.65%	222	56.35%	394
Orange	54	32.14%	114	67.86%	168
Putnam	149	57.53%	110	42.47%	259
Santa Rosa	256	44.52%	319	55.48%	575
St. Johns	198	65.56%	104	34.44%	302
Sumter	97	49.63%	98	50.26%	195
Suwannee	135	49.63%	137	50.37%	272
Taylor	89	50.28%	88	49.72%	177
Volusia	65	62.50%	39	37.50%	104
Wakulla	165	53.05%	146	46.95%	311
Walton	191	49.10%	198	50.90%	389
Washington	167	66.01%	86	33.99%	235
Totals	7,302	55.39%	5,882	44.61%	13,184

Counties that flipped from Know-Nothing to Opposition

- Columbia
- Duval
- Gadsden
- Madison
- Santa Rosa
- Walton

Counties that flipped from Democratic to Opposition

- Escambia
- Liberty
- Orange
- Sumter

Counties that flipped from Know-Nothing to Democratic

- Hamilton
- Holmes
- Jackson
- Levy
- Manatee
- Volusia
- Wakulla

== See also ==
- 1860 United States presidential election in Florida
- 1860 United States House of Representatives election in Florida
