= Senator Forward =

Senator Forward may refer to:

- Chauncey Forward (1793–1839), Pennsylvania State Senate
- William A. Forward (1812–1865), Florida State Senate
