= James Dawkins =

James Dawkins may refer to:

- James Dawkins (antiquarian) (1722–1757), MP for Woodstock and Hindon, antiquarian and Jacobite
- James Dawkins (MP, died 1766) (c. 1696–1766), English landowner and MP for Woodstock
- James Dawkins (MP, died 1843) (c. 1760–1843), MP for Chippenham 1784–1806 and 1807–1812, Hastings 1812–1826 and Wilton 1831–1832
- James Baird Dawkins (1820–1883), Confederate politician
- James C. Dawkins, United States Air Force general
- James Dawkins, drummer of The Trinity Band in England
- Jimmy Dawkins (1936–2013), American blues guitarist
