= Villepigue =

Villepigue is a surname. Notable people with the surname include:

- Frederick L. Villepigue, American politician
- John Bordenave Villepigue (1830–1862), U.S. Army officer
