= Charles W. Downing Jr. =

American politician

Charles W. Downing Jr. (1825–1862) was the third Secretary of State of the state of Florida, in office from July 23, 1849, and June 30, 1853.

== Life ==
At the time the governor of Florida was appointed to a three-year term by the President and the territory operated with little federal funding, while a popularly elected Florida Territorial Council had only minimal powers to borrow money, issue licenses, and organize a state militia. According to the State Archives of Florida, "A political protest in 1838 by Colonel Downing forced the establishment of a more representative bicameral legislature, where voices of rural farmers could be better presented. This reform was offset by the isolation of most homesteads and their lack of political participation. In 1840, Downing introduced House Bill 466 to end the Seminole War."

His father, Charles Downing, was a Delegate to the US House of Representatives from the Florida Territory. His wife, Fanny Murdaugh Downing, was an author and poet.

Political offices
Preceded by Augustus Maxwell	Secretary of State of Florida; 1849–1853	Succeeded by Frederick L. Villepigue
