= 1856 Florida gubernatorial election =

- October 6, 1856
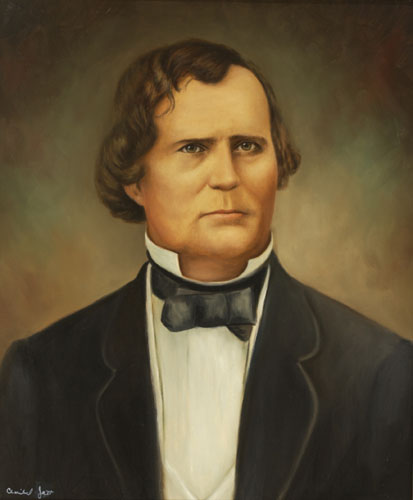

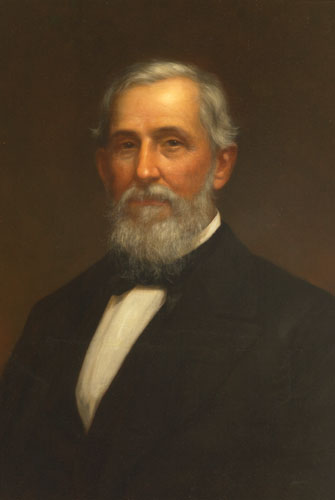
Nominee	Madison S. Perry	David S. Walker
Party	Democratic	Know Nothing
Alliance		Whig
Popular vote	6,214	5,894
Percentage	51.32%	48.68%
County results
Perry
50–60%
60–70%
70–80%
80–90%
>90%
Walker
50–60%
60–70%
70–80%
Governor before election
James E. Broome
Democratic
Elected Governor
Madison S. Perry
Democratic

The 1856 Florida gubernatorial election was held on October 6, 1856. Democratic Nominee Madison S. Perry defeated Know Nothing candidate David S. Walker.

The Election was decided by 320 votes.

== General election ==
=== Candidates ===
==== Democratic ====
- Madison S. Perry

==== Whig ====
- David S. Walker

=== Results ===
1856 Florida gubernatorial election
Party	Candidate	Votes	%	±%
Democratic	Madison S. Perry	6,214	51.32%	
Know Nothing	David S. Walker	5,894	48.68%	

=== Results by County ===
County	Madison S. Perry Democratic		David S. Walker Know Nothing		Total votes
County	#	%	#	%	Total votes
Alachua	336	64.00%	189	36.00%	525
Brevard	10	71.43%	4	28.57%	14
Calhoun	95	53.37%	83	46.63%	178
Columbia	433	46.46%	499	53.54%	932
Dade	6	100.00%	0	0%	6
Duval	270	35.62%	488	64.38%	758
Escambia	259	52.54%	234	47.46%	493
Franklin	156	59.32%	107	40.68%	263
Gadsden	368	46.52%	423	53.48%	791
Hamilton	186	45.15%	226	54.85%	412
Hernando	122	58.37%	87	41.63%	209
Hillsborough	318	66.95%	157	33.05%	475
Holmes	29	20.57%	112	79.43%	141
Jackson	408	46.42%	471	53.58%	879
Jefferson	354	66.79%	176	33.21%	530
Leon	404	52.33%	368	47.67%	772
Levy	68	46.26%	79	53.74%	147
Liberty	93	55.03%	76	44.97%	169
Madison	423	44.15%	535	55.85%	958
Manatee	22	39.29%	34	60.71%	56
Marion	353	56.94%	367	43.06%	620
Monroe	232	78.91%	62	21.09%	294
Nassau	106	53.27%	93	46.73%	199
Orange	55	56.12%	43	43.88%	98
Putnam	123	53.27%	106	46.29%	229
Santa Rosa	207	40.59%	303	59.41%	510
St. Johns	198	75.57%	64	24.43%	262
Sumter	82	50.31%	81	49.69%	163
Volusia	31	39.74%	47	60.26%	78
Wakulla	148	43.27%	194	56.73%	342
Walton	168	48.14%	181	51.86%	349
Washington	151	58.98%	105	41.02%	256
Totals	6,214	51.32%	5,894	48.68%	12,108

== See also ==
- 1856 United States presidential election in Florida
- 1856 United States House of Representatives election in Florida
