= Benjamin Waldo =

American politician (1816–1871)

Benjamin Waldo (1816 - 1871) was a medical doctor and state legislator in South Carolina. He relocated to Florida with his wife. Waldo, Florida is believed to have been named for him.

Dr. Joseph Waldo of Newberry, South Carolina was his father.

Waldo served in the South Carolina General Assembly representing Newberry, South Carolina and served on the Medical Committee. He was sworn in 1846. He left after a year with his wife Sarah nee Lipscomb Waldo and settled in Marion County, Florida.

He left the medical field due to Ill health and became a business partner of David Yulee in Florida. He had a son who served in the Confederate Army and two daughters. Sallie B. Waldo was one of his daughters. She married John Marshall Martin an officer in the Confederate Army. He was a Captain in the Marion Light Artillery, and a member of the Confederate Congress.

Waldo lived on the Pine Hill Plantation in Marion County.

News of his death reached his hometown in May, 1871.
