= Frederick L. Villepigue =

American politician

4th Secretary of State of Florida
- In office July 1, 1853 – January 13, 1863
- Governor: James E. Broome (1853-1857); Madison S. Perry (1857-1861); John Milton (1861-1863)
- Preceded by: Charles W. Downing, Jr.
- Succeeded by: Benjamin F. Allen

Personal details
- Born: c. 1826 South Carolina, United States
- Died: Unknown
- Resting place: Roselawn Cemetery in Monticello, Florida
- Spouse(s): Margaret Watson Armstrong (married April 19, 1860)
- Children: 2 Jeanne (1861); Harry (1863)
- Education: South Carolina College

Frederick L. Villepigue (c. 1826–?) was an American politician who served as Secretary of State of Florida from July 1, 1853, to January 13, 1863.

== Early life ==
Villepigue was born in South Carolina. He was descended from a Frenchman, Francois Villepigue, who immigrated from France to Saint-Domingue, a French colony, in 1788, but was killed by his slaves in a slave rebellion in 1800 in the Haitian Revolution. Francois' wife received a last-minute warning and escaped with their two sons, arriving with Pierre Laurent Jumelle at Charleston, and settling in Camden, South Carolina. One of the Villepigues' sons, Paul Francis became a prominent merchant in Camden, and one of his seven children was Fredrick L. Villepigue.

Villepigue graduated from South Carolina College and moved to Florida in the 1840s. The 1850 Census listed him as a 21-year-old lawyer living in Jefferson County.

== Florida Secretary of State ==
Villepigue was appointed to fill the unexpired term of Charles W. Downing, Jr. as Secretary of State of Florida on July 1, 1853, and was elected to that post on July 25, 1853, serving until January 13, 1863.

The 1860 Census listed Villepigue having a personal estate of $200.00. On April 19 of that year, he was married to Margaret Watson Armstrong, the eldest daughter of General James Watson Armstrong in the Presbyterian Church by the Rev. David Willis, in Macon, Georgia. Villepigue had one son, Harry, born in November 1863, and a daughter, Jeanne, born around 1861.

== Civil War service ==
On January 11, 1861, at the outbreak of the American Civil War, Villepigue publicly affixed the Great Seal of the State of Florida to Florida's Declaration of Independence on the east portico of the State Capitol, turned to face an assembled crowd, and "in a clear distinct voice proclaimed Florida an independent nation. A second later 15 cannons were fired in salute of the new state and shouting broke forth."

Villepigue enlisted in the Confederate States Army on March 3, 1862, at Tallahassee, joined Robert Howard Gamble's Artillery. In April 1862, he was appointed the first lieutenant of the Leon Light Artillery under Gamble, then a captain. Villepigue was promoted from lieutenant to captain of the Kilcrease Light Artillery on May 26, 1863. He served with the Kilcrease Light Artillery until November 22, 1864, when he resigned his commission to become Secretary of the Confederate Senate.

== Later life ==
On January 22, 1867, he began to serve as a judge of the criminal court in Monticello, Florida until the next session Florida Legislature and was paid an annual salary of $200 and $5 for each case tried. 1867 tax records show Villepigue owned 50 acres (200,000 m^{2}) assessed at $700 and one horse valued at $50, while records two years later show him as a lawyer worth $10. The 1870 Census listed Villepigue as having a personal estate of $300.

He is interred at Roselawn Cemetery in Monticello, Florida.

Political offices
Preceded by Charles W. Downing, Jr.	Secretary of State of Florida; 1853–1863	Succeeded by Benjamin F. Allen
