= Florida Sentinel =

Former American newspaper

The Florida Sentinel was a newspaper established in Quincy, Florida, United States and then relocated to Tallahassee, Florida where it was published from 1841 until 1865. Joshua Knowles founded the paper and Joseph Clisby became the paper's editor in Tallahassee. The newspaper office printed a journal of the Senate during its first session and reports on the Florida Supreme Court. The House also contracted with him to publish their proceedings. February 19, 1870, the paper covered an attack by alligators on circus animals being led through the Great Dismal Swamp. In 1851, the office printed the minutes of the West Florida Baptist Association annual session held October 26 to October 29, 1850, at the Union Academy Church in Jackson County.

== History ==
Knowles began publishing the Quincy Sentinel in Quincy, Florida (northwest of Tallahassee) in November 1839. The paper began publishing in Tallahassee in February or March 1841 as a successor to Quincy Sentinel.

== Reporting ==
Clisby reported on the lynching of alleged robber who operated during the era of the Seminole Wars. Clisby went on to purchase the Macon Telegraph in Georgia in 1855.

== See also ==
- Benjamin F. Allen, former editor
- Floridian & Journal
