= 1860 United States presidential election in Florida =

- November 6, 1860
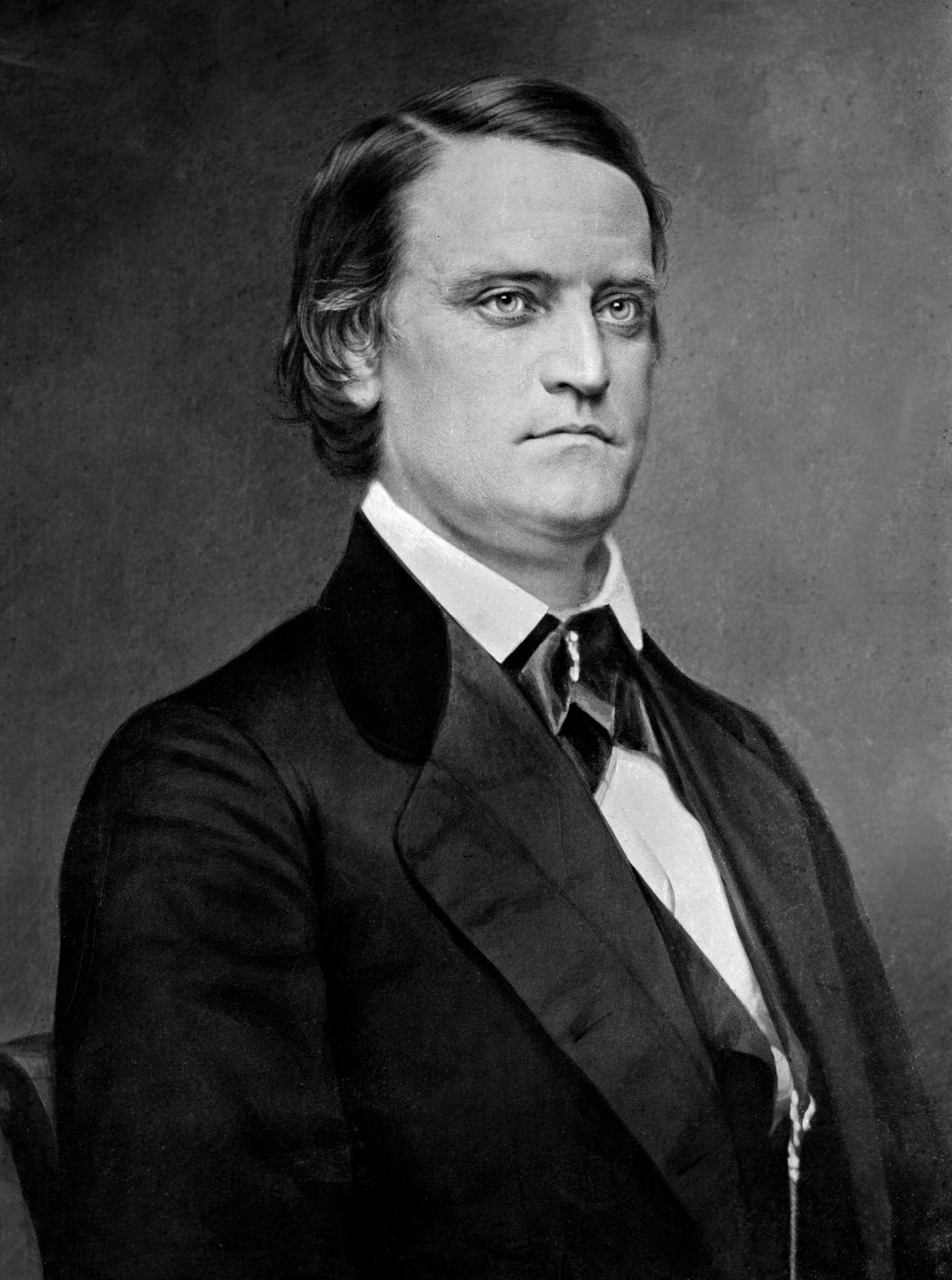

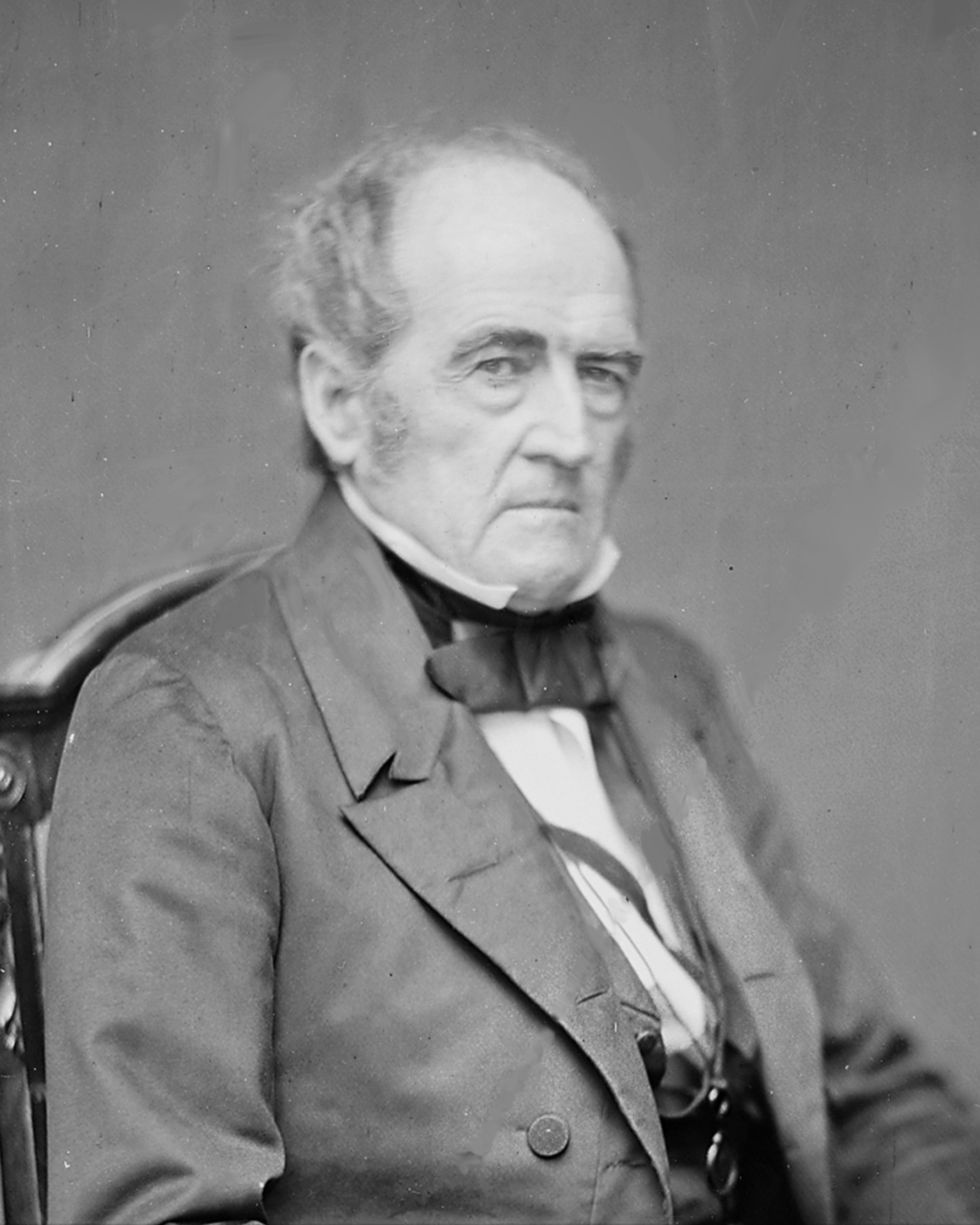
Nominee	John C. Breckinridge	John Bell
Party	Southern Democratic	Constitutional Union
Home state	Kentucky	Tennessee
Running mate	Joseph Lane	Edward Everett
Electoral vote	3	0
Popular vote	8,277	4,801
Percentage	62.23%	36.10%
County results
Breckinridge
50–60%
60–70%
70–80%
80–90%
90–100%
No votes
Bell
40–50%
50–60%
60–70%
President before election
James Buchanan
Democratic
Elected President
Abraham Lincoln
Republican

The 1860 United States presidential election in Florida took place on November 2, 1860, as part of the 1860 United States presidential election. Voters chose three electors of the Electoral College, who voted for president and vice president.

Florida was won by Southern Democratic candidate John C. Breckinridge, who won the state by a margin of 26.13%.

The Republican Party and its candidate Abraham Lincoln did not have significant ballot distribution in the state.

This was the last presidential election Florida would participate in until the 1868 election due to the American Civil War and the beginnings of the Reconstruction Era.

== Results ==
1860 United States presidential election in Florida
Party	Candidate	Votes	%
Southern Democratic	John C. Breckinridge	8,277	62.23%
Constitutional Union	John Bell	4,801	36.10%
Democratic	Stephen A. Douglas	223	1.68%
Total votes		13,301	100%

=== Results By County ===
1860 United States Presidential Election in Florida (by county) (Note: No returns have been located for this election for Putnam County.)
County	John C. Breckinridge Southern Democratic		John Bell Constitutional Union		Stephen A. Douglas Democratic		Total votes cast
County	#	%	#	%	#	%	Total votes cast
Alachua	527	72.49%	195	26.82%	5	0.69%	727
Brevard	8	100.00%	0	0.00%	0	0.00%	8
Calhoun	57	86.36%	9	13.64%	0	0.00%	66
Clay	57	33.33%	114	66.67%	0	0.00%	171
Columbia	406	65.17%	214	34.35%	3	0.48%	623
Dade	16	100.00%	0	0.00%	0	0.00%	16
Duval	346	58.45%	195	32.94%	51	8.61%	592
Escambia	192	28.83%	377	56.61%	97	14.56%	666
Franklin	284	82.32%	61	17.68%	0	0.00%	345
Gadsden	392	50.52%	384	49.48%	0	0.00%	776
Hamilton	243	64.46%	111	29.44%	23	6.10%	377
Hernando	151	84.36%	27	15.08%	1	0.56%	179
Hillsborough	303	83.47%	60	16.53%	0	0.00%	363
Holmes	115	60.85%	74	39.15%	0	0.00%	189
Jackson	512	52.57%	462	47.43%	0	0.00%	974
Jefferson	487	75.50%	158	24.50%	0	0.00%	645
Lafayette	96	54.55%	80	45.45%	0	0.00%	176
Leon	482	63.09%	282	36.91%	0	0.00%	764
Levy	195	80.58%	47	19.42%	0	0.00%	242
Liberty	74	49.66%	75	50.34%	0	0.00%	149
Madison	444	66.27%	226	33.73%	0	0.00%	670
Marion	510	83.61%	99	16.23%	1	0.16%	610
Manatee	50	100.00%	0	0.00%	0	0.00%	50
Monroe	219	78.49%	60	21.51%	0	0.00%	279
Nassau	291	77.81%	82	21.93%	1	0.27%	374
New River	278	59.91%	179	38.58%	7	1.51%	464
Orange	46	37.70%	67	54.92%	9	7.38%	122
St. Johns	211	74.04%	74	25.96%	0	0.00%	285
Santa Rosa	266	38.33%	411	59.22%	17	2.45%	694
Sumter	109	70.78%	44	28.57%	1	0.65%	154
Suwannee	144	48.98%	145	49.32%	5	1.70%	294
Taylor	88	57.89%	64	42.11%	0	0.00%	152
Volusia	69	80.23%	17	19.77%	0	0.00%	86
Washington	151	71.23%	61	28.77%	0	0.00%	212
Wakulla	175	62.50%	104	37.14%	1	0.36%	280
Walton	161	48.20%	173	51.80%	0	0.00%	334
Total	8,155	62.22%	4,731	36.10%	221	1.69%	13,107

== See also ==
- United States presidential elections in Florida
- 1860 United States House of Representatives election in Florida
- 1860 Florida Gubernatorial election
