= Livingston Rowe Schuyler =

American academic and Episcopal priest

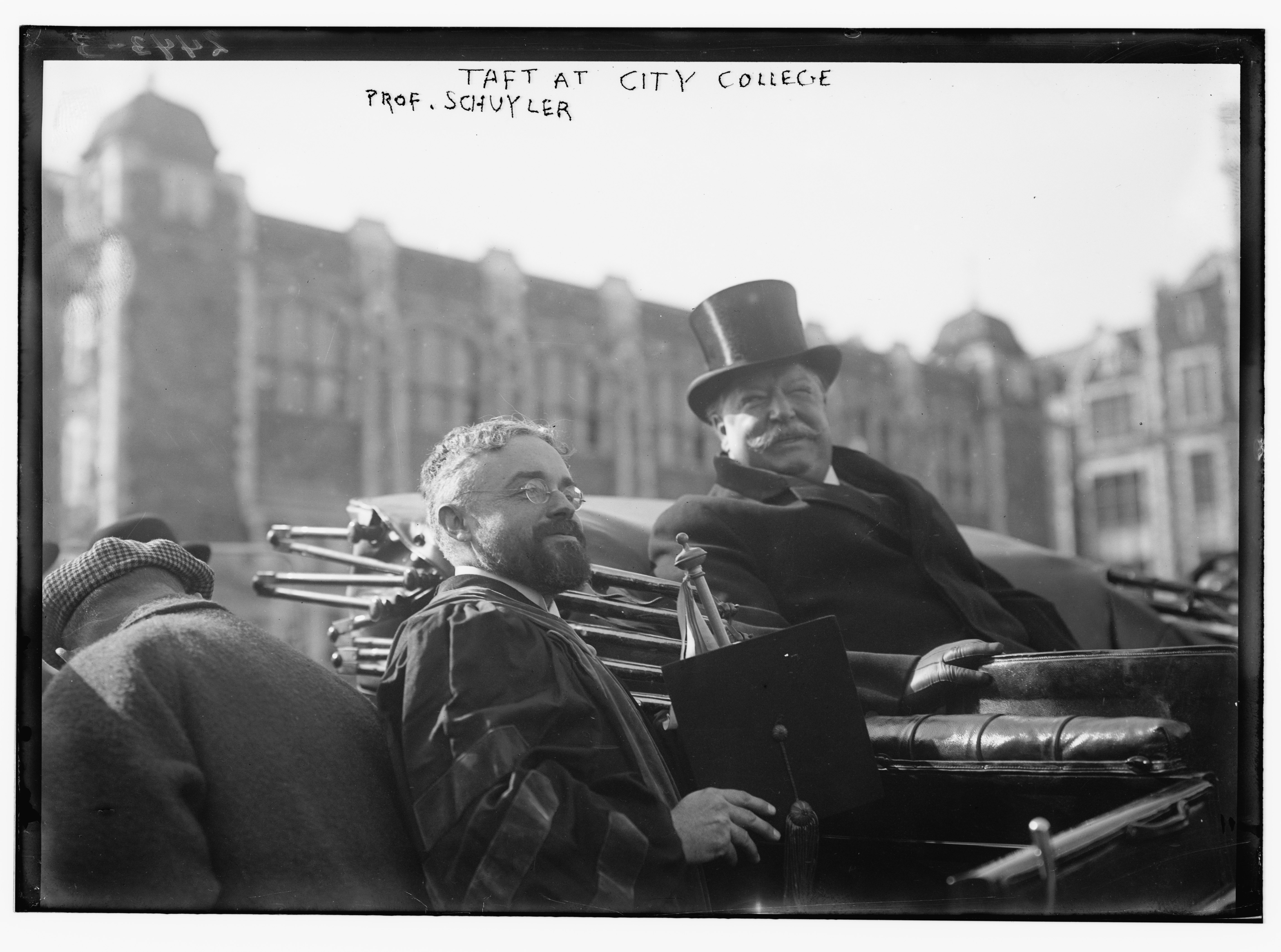
- Schuyler (left) with President William Howard Taft in 1912
- Born: July 22, 1868; New York, New York, U.S.
- Died: January 1, 1931 (aged 62); New York, New York, U.S.
- Education: City College of New York (B.A., M.A.); General Theological Seminary
- Occupations: historian minister
- Spouse: Leonora St. George Rogers

Livingston Rowe Schuyler (July 22, 1868 – January 1, 1931) was an American historian and Episcopal priest. He served on the faculty at the City College of New York.

== Education ==
Schuyler received a Bachelor of Arts from City College of New York in 1889 and a Master of Arts from the same institution in 1893. He was ordained in the Episcopal Church in 1894 and graduated from General Theological Seminary in 1895. Following his seminary studies, he went abroad for four years to attend the University of Oxford and the University of Paris.

== Career ==
During his time in France, Schuyler served as assistant minister of the American Cathedral in Paris. When he returend to the United States in 1898, he began working as a history tutor at City College of New York.

From 1901 to 1908, he was the rector of the Church of St. James the Less in Scarsdale, New York and, from 1908 to 1915, he was the minister-in-charge at the Church of St. Andrew By the Sea in Allenhurst, New Jersey. He was also an assistant minister of the Church of the Mediator in Kingsbridge, Bronx from 1912 until his death. He was also chaplain of the Washington Continental Guard.

He later joined the faculty at City College as an associate professor of history, a position he kept for fourteen years. He served as president of the History Teachers Association of the Middle States and Maryland. As a historian, he authored multiple articles and pamphlets, including The Liberty of the Press in the American Colonies.

== Personal life and death ==
He married Leonora St. George Rogers in 1894. His wife was a prominent socialite who served as President General of the United Daughters of the Confederacy. They were listed in the Social Register in 1912.

Schuyler died on January 1, 1931 at St. Luke's Hospital in New York City.
