= Floridian & Journal =

Floridian newspaper

Floridian & Journal (1849-1865?) was a newspaper in Tallahassee, Florida and one of the leading newspapers in Florida for its time. Samuel Sibley was the editor of the Floridian in 1845. Charles E. Dyke was one of its editors and also served as mayor of Tallahassee. The Library of Congress has a collection of the newspapers editions on microfilm.

== History ==
Robert Benjamin Hilton moved to Tallahassee, Florida, where he established a law practice in 1849. The same year, he and Augustus Maxwell entered the newspaper business when they co-owned and edited the Floridian in Tallahassee. In 1849 they merged the paper with the Southern Journal to form the Floridian and Journal. The Southern Journal had been published from 1846 until 1849.

The newspaper's office printed Florida Attorney General David P. Hogue's report on cases argued and adjudicated by the Supreme Court of Florida in 1852.

The paper covered one of secessionist U.S. Senator Stephen Mallory's speeches March 27, 1858 and various political movements leading up to Florida's secession from the United States before the American Civil War. Also in 1858 the paper reported on the capture of Billy Bowleg.

"Lincoln is elected. This is the Beginning of the end", the paper declared in 1860.

In 1861 the office printed the publication titled Convention of the People of Florida: Begun and Held at the Capitol in the City of Tallahassee [sic], on Thursday, January 3, AD, Part 1861, covering the Florida Secession Convention.

Alvan S. Harper photographed the Weekly Floridian / The Floridian Printing Company Building.

== Publishers ==
Publishers of the paper included Maxwell & Hilton, Charles E. Dyke, (1852-1855), Dyke & Williams (1855), J. Jones (1855), Dyke & Carlisle (1861-1863), and Dyke & Sparhawk (1864).

== Legacy ==
The paper's articles are cited as resources for coverage of events including political organizing and Florida's secession movement before the American Civil War.

== See also ==
- Florida Sentinel, published in Tallahassee from 1841 until 1865
