= Leonora St. George Rogers Schuyler =

American socialite and clubwoman

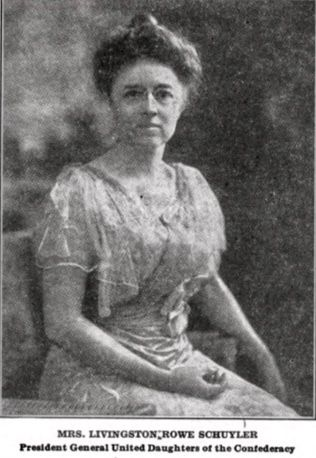
- Portrait of Schuyler published in Confederate Veteran in 1922

President General of the United Daughters of the Confederacy
- In office 1921–1923
- Preceded by: May Faris McKinney

Personal details
- Born: Leonora Lacy St. George Rogers; November 16, 1868 Ocala, Florida, U.S.
- Died: December 8, 1952 (aged 84)
- Spouse: Livingston Rowe Schuyler
- Parents: Samuel St. George Rogers (father); Josephine A. Baynard (mother)

Leonora Lacy St. George Rogers Schuyler (November 16, 1868 – December 8, 1952) was an American socialite who served as President General of the United Daughters of the Confederacy from 1921 to 1923. Although born in Florida, she lived primarily in New York City and was considered the first woman from above the Mason–Dixon line to become president general of the United Daughters of the Confederacy. Schuyler was also an active member of the Colonial Dames of America, the Daughters of the American Revolution, and the U.S. Daughters of 1812.

== Early life and family ==
Schuyler was born Leonora Lacy St. George Rogers on November 16, 1868 in Ocala, Florida. She was the daughter of Colonel Samuel St. George Rogers and Josephine A. Baynard Rogers. Her father, an officer in the Confederate States Army, served in the Confederate States Congress and the 2nd Confederate States Congress.

She grew up in Ocala and in Savannah, Georgia. She attended school in Savannah and in New York.

== Career ==
=== Clubs and philanthropy ===
In 1904, Schuyler became a manager of the Peabody Home for Aged Women. In 1905, Schuyler was appointed as chairman of an essay contest on the Confederate States of America. In 1912, she was listed in the Social Register.

Schuyler was a member of the New York Southern Women's Patriotic Society, the Allied Patriotic Societies, Colonial Dames of America, the Daughters of the American Revolution, the U.S. Daughters of 1812, and the United Daughters of the Confederacy. She served as regent of the Manhattan Chapter of the Daughters of the American Revolution from 1913 to 1915. Once her term as regent ended, she served as president of the International Council for Patriotic Service.

Schuyler was elected as President General of the United Daughters of the Confederacy and served in that office from 1921 to 1923. Despite being born in the South, she spent most of her life in the North and was considered the first woman from above the Mason-Dixon line to be elected president general. On December 11, 1923, she decorated Major General John A. Lejeune with the Cross of Service, bestowed by the United Daughters of the Confederacy upon World War I veterans of Confederate ancestry, during a ceremony at her home in New York City. During her term as president general, she also placed a wreath with the UDC Cross of Honor for World War Veterans and a bronze UDC insignia at the Tomb of the Unknown Soldier in Arlington National Cemetery, which were accepted by General William H. Hart, the Quartermaster General of the United States Army. Under her leadership, a UDC chapter was established in New Jersey. In 1924, she dedicated a bust of General Robert E. Lee to the Royal Military College, Sandhurst in England. In August 1924, she presented a portrait of Admiral Raphael Semmes to the Council of State of the Canton of Geneva in Switzerland.

In 1934, Schuyler became the first woman to receive a parchment of distinction from the New York Southern Society. In 1939, she was elected president of the Church Layman's Association.

=== Politics ===
Schuyler was an anti-communist and, in 1938, she accused New York City mayor Fiorello H. La Guardia of being a "Communist Socialist". She unsuccessfully sought nomination for the United States Congress in the 19th New York Congressional District that same year. Her petitions, naming Democrats and Republicans who opposed the re-election of Rep. Sol Bloom, were rejected.

== Personal life and death ==
She married Rev. Livingston Rowe Schuyler in New York City in 1894. Her husband was an associate professor at the City College of New York. Her husband died in 1931.

Schuyler died on December 8, 1952 after suffering a heart attack.
