= Patrick Houston (captain) =

Patrick Houston (September 30, 1837 – 1901) was a state senator and military man from Leon County, Florida, United States.

Houston was born in Savannah, Georgia, to Edward Houston (Houstoun) and came to Tallahassee, Florida in 1838 or 1839.

== Civil War ==
He served as a lieutenant in Gamble's Florida Light Artillery and in the Kilcrease Light Artillery. He was in command of the artillery battery at the Battle of Natural Bridge when Union Army forces under General John Newton came ashore near St. Marks, Florida.

== Post Civil War ==
Houston served on the Leon County Commission and served in Florida State Senate, presiding over the senate in 1887. He was appointed Adjutant General of the State of Florida by Governor Henry Laurens Mitchell serving from 1893 to 1897.

=== Houston and farming ===
Houston's farm was known as Lakeland Stock Farm. There he bred 250 head of Durham, Jersey, and Guernsey cattle. Houston also is reported to have had 20 horses, 10 mules, and 500 head of sheep. He also grew crops on 150 acres (0.61 km^{2}) of land including 300 pecan trees, corn, wheat, rye, potatoes, and cotton (according to the Tenth U.S. Census, 1879–1880).
