= William A. Forward =

American judge

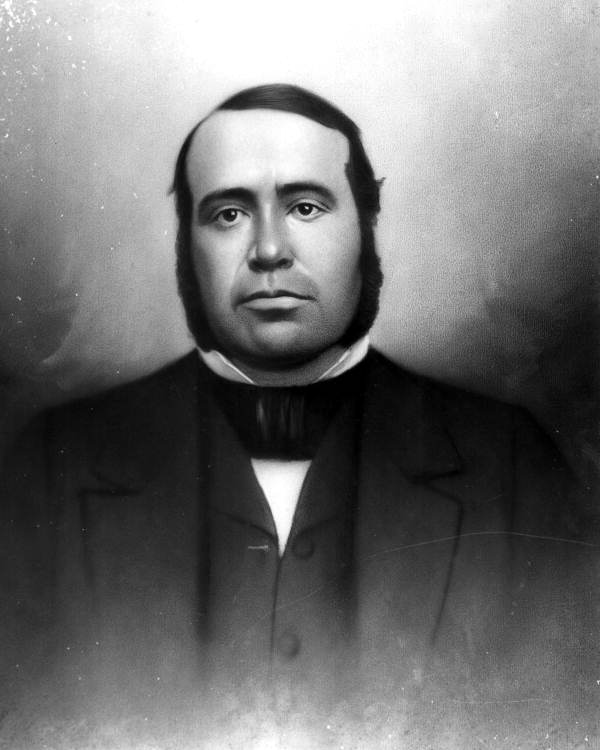
- Forward in 1860

Justice of the Florida Supreme Court
- In office January 2, 1860 – October 19, 1865

Personal details
- Born: 1812 New York, U.S.
- Died: October 19, 1865 (aged 52–53) Savannah, Georgia, U.S.

William Augustus Forward (1812 – October 19, 1865) was a Florida lawyer, planter and Democratic politician who served on the Florida Supreme Court from 1860 to 1865.

Forward was born in New York in 1812. He was a cousin of Walker Forward, Treasury Secretary to William Henry Harrison. Though his father had fought in the War of 1812, circa 1816 the family moved to Canada. While in Canada, he studied law, but was banished from Canada for participating in the Rebellions of 1837. He then returned to New York. He was befriended by Congressman Isaac H. Bronson, and moved to Florida at his behest.

Forward moved to St. Augustine, where he opened a legal practice and entered politics as a Democrat. Widowed in 1841, Forward then remarried on June 9, 1842, to Mary Hutchinson, daughter of a New York attorney and granddaughter of a Dartmouth College president. He embraced planter life and is known to have owned slaves in 1850. Like many in East Florida, Forward resisted statehood for Florida and supported the division of Florida, contrary to the sentiments of most Democrats at the time.

In 1844, St. Johns County elected him to the Florida Territorial Legislature, and in January 1845 became its Speaker. After statehood he left office, but was elected to the Florida Senate to replace Senator George Center after his resignation adjourned session in November 1845. He chaired the judiciary committee. He returned to the House in 1847 and was reelected to the Senate in 1848, a Democrat in a Whig controlled legislature. As a legislator, he was opposed to the popular election of circuit judges, but supported popular election of probate judges. He also supported granting defendants greater rights to appeal. In 1850, the Democrats held a majority and he became chair of the Corporations Committee.

He continued to oppose popular election of circuit judges. His proposal that judges be appointed by the governor with confirmation by the Senate was not adopted. His bid to become a judge was not successful in 1850. But he defeated incumbent Thomas Douglas in 1853 to become Circuit Judge for East Florida. In 1851 he opened a practice with former Comptroller Simon Towle in Tallahassee. He left the bench four years later, and entered into private practice with John P. Sanderson.

Forward moved to Palatka, where he became a charter member of the First Presbyterian Church. The church first convened at the Putnam County Courthouse in 1856. In 1859, he was elected to the Supreme Court; he began serving January 2, 1860. He supported secession to the point of nearly volunteering to serve in the Second Florida Infantry as a private. He became ill in July 1865 and died in Savannah on October 19, on a journey to seek medical treatment.
