= 1856 United States presidential election in Florida =

- November 4, 1856
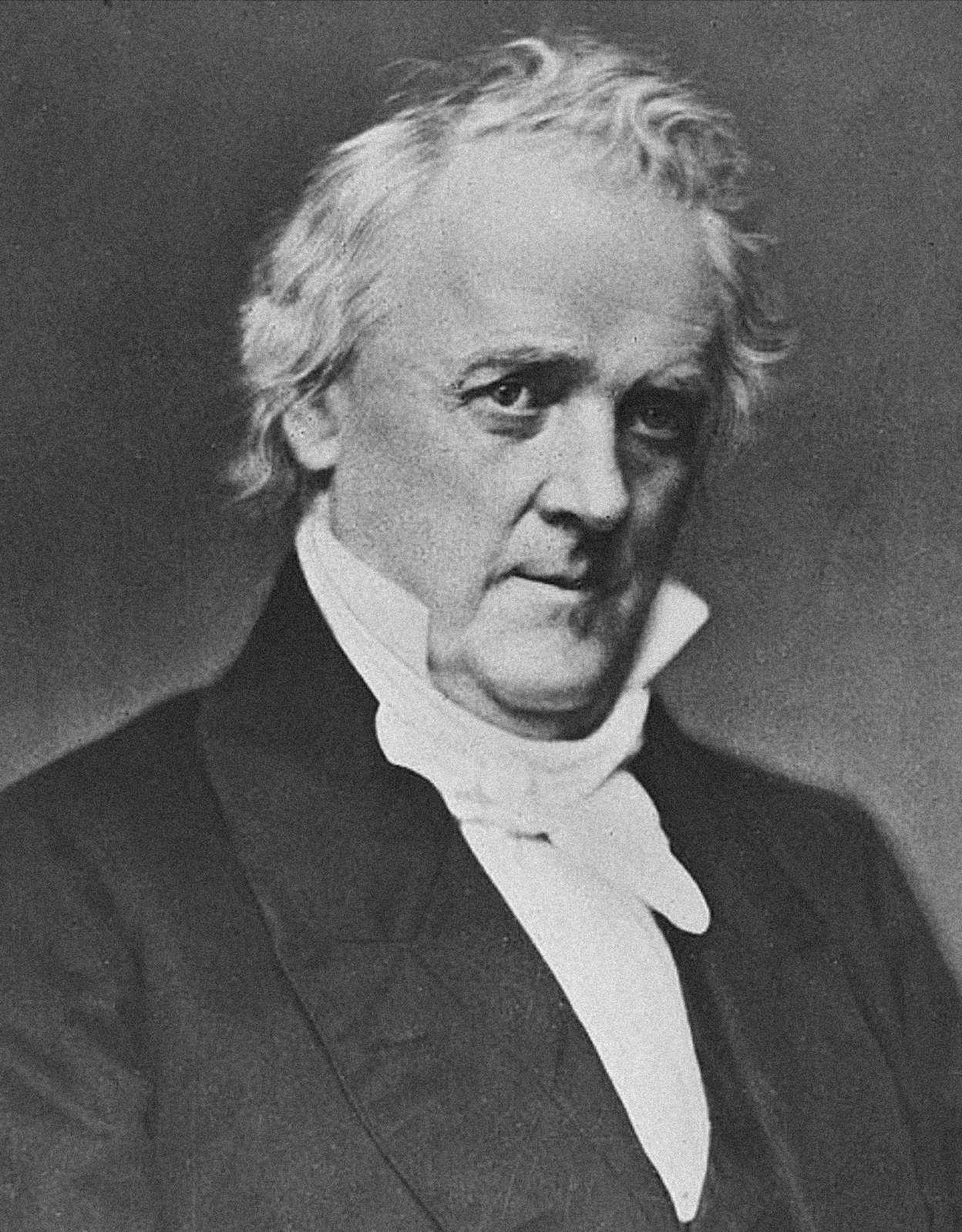

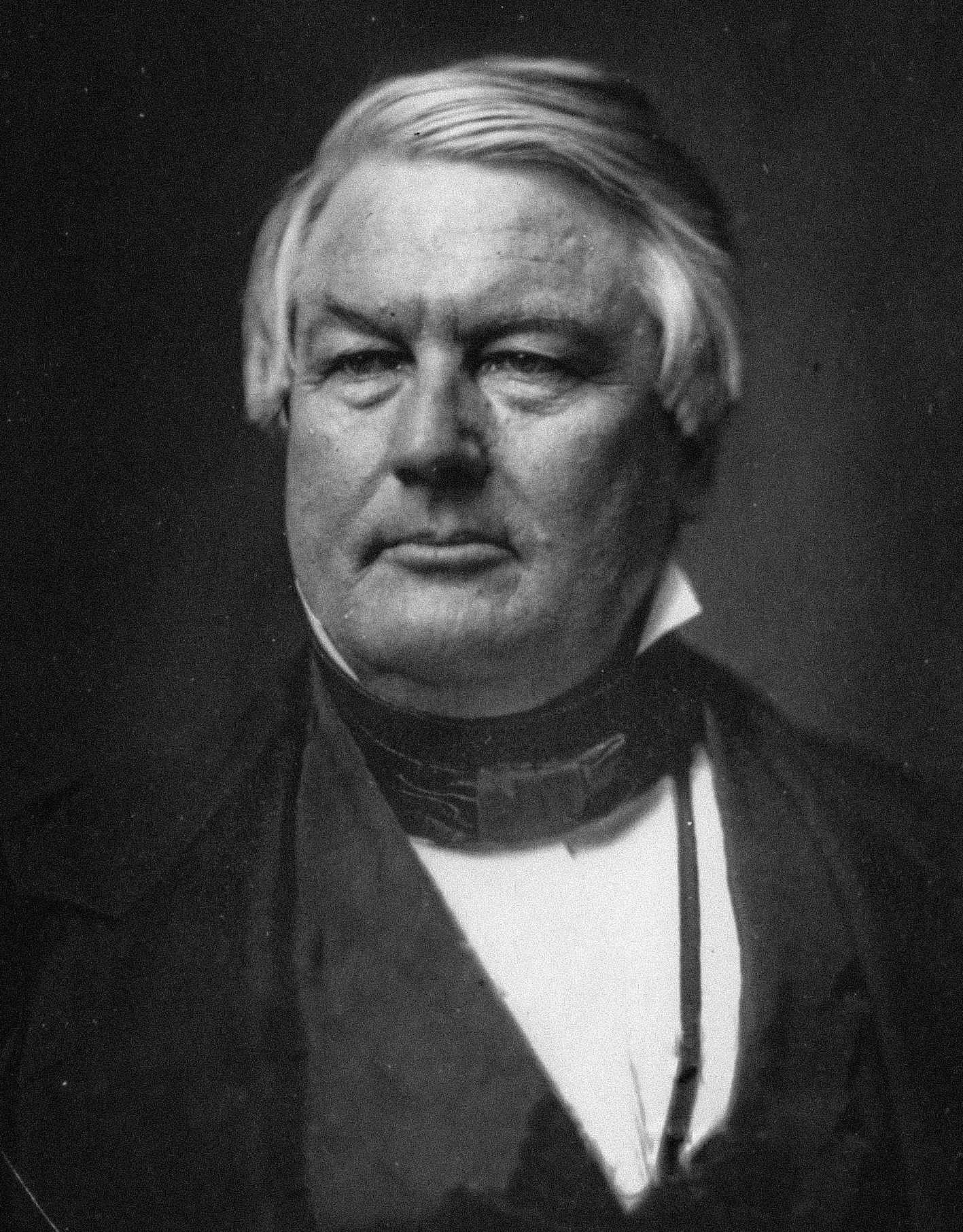
Nominee	James Buchanan	Millard Fillmore
Party	Democratic	Know Nothing
Home state	Pennsylvania	New York
Running mate	John C. Breckinridge	Andrew Jackson Donelson
Electoral vote	3	0
Popular vote	6,358	4,833
Percentage	56.81%	43.19%
County results
Buchanan
50–60%
60–70%
70–80%
80–90%
Fillmore
50–60%
60–70%
Unknown/No Vote
President before election
Franklin Pierce
Democratic
Elected President
James Buchanan
Democratic

The 1856 United States presidential election in Florida took place on November 4, 1856, as part of the 1856 United States presidential election. Voters chose three representatives, or electors to the Electoral College, who voted for president and vice president.

Florida voted for the Democratic candidate, James Buchanan, over American Party candidate Millard Fillmore. Buchanan won Florida by a margin of 13.62%.

Republican Party candidate John C. Frémont was not on the ballot in the state.

== Results ==
1856 United States presidential election in Florida
Party	Candidate	Votes	%
Democratic	James Buchanan	6,358	56.81%
Know Nothing	Millard Fillmore	4,833	43.19%
Total votes		11,191	100%

=== Results by county ===
1856 United States Presidential Election in Florida (By County)
County	James Buchanan Democratic		Millard Fillmore Know Nothing		Total Votes Cast
County	#	%	#	%	Total Votes Cast
Alachua	361	71.77%	142	28.23%	503
Calhoun	71	58.68%	50	41.32%	121
Columbia	462	50.11%	460	49.89%	922
Duval	341	44.00%	434	56.00%	775
Escambia	249	51.55%	234	48.45%	483
Franklin	177	64.84%	96	35.16%	273
Gadsden	328	52.23%	300	47.77%	628
Hamilton	180	53.41%	157	46.59%	337
Hernando	101	71.63%	40	28.37%	141
Hillsborough	365	67.84%	173	32.16%	538
Holmes	76	46.63%	87	53.37%	163
Jackson	431	48.54%	457	51.46%	888
Jefferson	390	72.90%	145	27.10%	535
Leon	414	58.47%	294	41.53%	708
Levy	45	45.00%	55	55.00%	100
Liberty	88	58.28%	63	41.72%	151
Madison	454	55.77%	360	44.23%	814
Manatee	24	43.64%	31	56.36%	55
Marion	324	60.67%	210	39.33%	534
Monroe	222	80.43%	54	19.57%	276
Nassau	133	65.52%	70	34.48%	203
Orange	51	60.71%	33	39.29%	84
Putnam	70	73.68%	25	26.32%	95
St. Johns	198	72.53%	75	27.47%	273
Santa Rosa	200	37.45%	334	62.55%	534
Sumpter	100	67.11%	49	32.89%	149
Volusia	52	55.91%	41	44.09%	93
Wakulla	169	53.14%	149	46.86%	318
Walton	129	47.43%	143	52.57%	272
Washington	153	68.00%	72	32.00%	225
Total	6,358	56.81%	4,833	43.19%	11,191

== See also ==
- United States presidential elections in Florida
- 1856 United States House of Representatives election in Florida
- 1856 Florida gubernatorial election
