= Fanny Murdaugh Downing =

American novelist and poet

- Born: Frances Murdaugh; October 19, 1831; Portsmouth, Virginia, U.S.
- Died: May 6, 1894 (aged 62); Portsmouth
- Other name: Fanny
- Occupation: Author
- Spouse: Charles W. Downing Jr. (m. 1851; died 1862)
- Children: 4
- Writing career
- Pen name: Viola; Frank Dashmore
- Language: English
- Genres: novels; poetry
- Notable works: Nameless, a novel

Fanny Murdaugh Downing (née Frances Murdaugh; pen names, Viola and Frank Dashmore; October 19, 1831 - May 6, 1894) was a 19th-century American author and poet. She was the first resident novelist of Mecklenburg County, North Carolina. Downing's principal publications included: Nameless, a novel, 1865; Perfect though Suffering, a Tale, 1867; Florida, a Tale of the Land of Flowers; Pluto, or the Origin of Mint Julep, a story in verse. Most of her poems described her love and devotion for Confederate soldiers. In addition to Pluto, her best known poems were "The Legend of Catawba" and "Dixie".

== Early life and education ==
Frances Murdaugh was born in Portsmouth, Virginia, October 19, 1831. (Note: According to White (2013), Downing was born in 1835.) Her parents were Hon. John Washington Murdaugh, a distinguished name in Virginia; and Margaret Waller Murdaugh.

She was educated in a private school in Virginia.

== Career ==
She was married, in 1851, to Charles W. Downing Jr., Esq., of Florida, and at that time its Secretary of State. They had four children, including a daughter, Margaret. During the Civil War, she lived in Virginia, and then became a refugee in Charlotte, North Carolina, remaining until 1869.

Her literary life began in North Carolina, in 1863, with a song entitled "Folia Autumni" and published under the pen name of "Viola". Its warm reception caused her to follow it up with other productions.

Her health was not robust, and many of her works are composed while too weak to leave her bed. A comedy of three acts, called Nobody Hurt, was thus dashed off in ten hours. When she began to write for the public, she announced her intention in a letter to a friend: "I shall write first to see if I can write; then for money, and then for fame!"

"I write pretty much as the birds sing, because it is in me, and must come out." (Downing, 1916)

She wrote hundreds of poem at this time, using the pseudonyms of "Frank Dashmore" and "Viola". Numerous poetical effusions were of a religious tinge, and seem subdued. They were remarkable for musical rhythm, and an easy and graceful flow of feelings. Among the best of these were her "Egomet Ipse", a terrible heart searcher; "Faithful unto Death", full of a wild pathos; and "Desolate", an elegiac poem. "Pluto" was her longest poem. Many of her productions were extensively copied both North and South.

She had already written good poetry which was appreciated and applauded, and her next venture was in prose fiction. Her first novel, Nameless (1865), was said to have been hastily written in ten days, as a proof whether or not she could write prose. The typography and binding were characterized as being handsome. My September 1866, there was already a Fourth Edition.

Her writing improved, developed, and matured in her next novels, Perfect through Suffering and Florida.

Then came a series of poems of a sterner sort, which were deemed by some to be rebellious. Of this style are "Confederate Gray", "Holly and Cypress", "Prometheus Vinctus", "Memorial Flowers", "Our President", "Two Years Ago", "Sic Semper Tyrannis", and "Dixie". She also wrote some love poems.

She was president of the Ladies' Memorial Association of Charlotte after the war until her removal from Charlotte in 1869.

== Personal life ==
Downing was active in the social life of Charlotte. She was a member of the Daughters of the American Revolution.

By April 1894, Downing was noted to be extremely ill at her residence in Portsmouth. She died there on May 7, 1894. She was survived by a son, two daughters, a brother, Captain William Murdaugh, and a sister, Mrs. Washington Reed. A son, Charles, preceded her in death.

== Selected works ==
=== Plays ===
- Nobody Hurt, a play

=== Novels ===
- Nameless, a novel, 1865
- Perfect though Suffering, a tale, 1867
- Florida, a Tale of the Land of Flowers

=== Poetry ===
- Pluto, or the Origin of Mint Julep, a story in verse
- "The Legend of Catawba"
- "Dixie"
