= Kilcrease Light Artillery =

- Disbanded: May 10, 1865
- Country: Confederate States of America
- Allegiance: Confederate States Army
- Branch: Artillery
- Type: Light artillery
- Size: Company
- Part of: Department of South Carolina, Georgia, and Florida
- Garrison/HQ: St. Johns Island, South Carolina; various locations in Florida
- Engagements: Battle of Natural Bridge, American Civil War

Commanders
- Notable commanders: Captain Patrick Houston, Captain Frederick L. Villepigue

The Kilcrease Light Artillery was a Confederate army artillery company.

Headed by Captain Patrick Houston and Captain Frederick L. Villepigue, it was formed in Leon County, Florida in the spring of 1863 upon the dividing of the Leon Light Artillery. The Kilcrease company was assigned to the Department of South Carolina, Georgia, and Florida, and served at St. Johns Island, South Carolina as well as in the Battle of Natural Bridge. The Kilcrease company was also stationed in various locations in Florida. The company was included in the surrender at Tallahassee, Florida, on May 10, 1865.

Villepigue had been a first lieutenant with the Leon Light Artillery and was promoted to captain of the Kilcrease company on May 26, 1863. He served with the Kilcrease Light Artillery until November 22, 1864, when he resigned his commission to become Secretary of the Confederate Senate.

== See also ==
- List of Florida Civil War Confederate units
