= Welaunee Plantation (Jefferson County, Florida) =

Coordinates: 30.3694°N 83.9404°W

Welaunee Plantation was a forced-labor farm growing cotton near Wacissa in Jefferson County, Florida, established by Col. Robert Howard Gamble.

== History ==
Robert Howard Gamble was born in Grove Hill, Botetourt County, Virginia in 1815, the son of son of Captain Robert Gamble who fought in the American Revolutionary War. His mother was General James Breckinridge's daughter Letitia who ignored the matrimonial offerings of Captain Meriwether Lewis to marry Robert Gramble instead.

Welaunee Plantation was established in 1826 when Robert Gamble brought his family to Florida from Virginia. Robert's brother, John Grattan Gamble, established Waukeenah Plantation next to Welaunee. From 1838, Fort Welaunee became a settlers' fort on the Welaunee Plantation near Wacissa. Later this was Fort Gamble and operated from 1839 to 1843.

Welawnee Plantation house c. 1959

== Resources ==
- cstone.net
