= Legislative Council of the Territory of Florida =

The Legislative Council of the Territory of Florida, often referred to as the Florida Territorial Council or Florida Territorial Legislative Council, was the legislative body governing the American territory of Florida (Florida Territory) before statehood. The territory of Florida was acquired by the U.S. in 1821 under the Adams–Onís Treaty. Replacing the form of martial law that had existed in the territory since Florida was acquired, the U.S. Congress in 1822 established a territorial government consisting of a governor, secretary, thirteen-member Legislative Council, and judiciary, all of whom were appointed by the U.S. president.

Congress changed the Legislative Council's structure many times in the 1820s and 1830s, gradually granting the territory more autonomy. Beginning in 1826, Council members were popularly elected rather than appointed by the president. In 1838, the Council became bicameral and was divided into a Senate and House of Representatives.

The Council was superseded by the General Assembly of the State of Florida after statehood was granted in 1845.

== Capital ==
The Council determined to rotate between the historical capitals of Pensacola and San Agustín. The first legislative session was held at Pensacola on July 22, 1822; this required delegates from St. Augustine to travel 59 days by sea to attend. To get to the second session in St. Augustine, Pensacola members traveled 28 days over land. During this session, the council decided future meetings should be held at a half-way point to reduce the distance; eventually Tallahassee, site of successive Indian settlements until burned by Andrew Jackson, was selected as a half-way point between the former capitals of East and West Florida.

Dr. William H. Simmons and John Lee Williams of Pensacola were commissioned by the second Florida Territorial Council to select a central point between St. Augustine and Pensacola to serve as capital of the Florida Territory in 1823. The Florida Territorial Council commissioned John Bellamy, a Monticello, Florida, planter, to build Bellamy Road.

== Significant acts ==
One of the requirements for a United States territory to become a state of the Union is that its constitution be approved by the United States Congress. In order to fulfill that requirement, an Act was passed by the Florida Territorial Council in 1838, approved by Governor Richard Keith Call, calling for the election of delegates in October 1838 to a convention to be held at St. Joseph, Florida. The delegates were to draft a constitution and bill of rights for the Territory of Florida. The Constitutional Convention convened on December 3, 1838, with Robert R. Reid presiding as president and Joshua Knowles secretary. The work of the Convention was carried out by eighteen committees, whose members were familiar with that particular area of government. The process was a relatively simple one, since they used the constitutions of several other Southern states as models. Only on the subject of banking did much debate take place. The Convention adjourned sine die on January 11, 1839.

Jackson County was created by the Florida Territorial Council in 1822 out of Escambia County, along with Duval County out of St. Johns County, making them the third and fourth counties in the Territory. The county was named for Andrew Jackson, who had served as Florida's first military governor for six months in 1821. Jackson County originally extended from the Choctawhatchee River on the west to the Suwannee River on the east. The county had been reduced close to its present boundaries by 1840 through the creation of new counties from its original territory. Minor adjustments to the county boundaries continued through most of the 19th century, however.

== Participants ==
Richard Keith Call, Davis Floyd, Charles W. Downing, Jr., Thomas Baltzell, Joseph B. Lancaster, William A. Forward and David Yulee were among those who participated in the Council.

Zephaniah Kingsley, a plantation owner, slave trader, and merchant who had polygamous "marriages" with four purchased slave women he had emancipated, served a single term and did not run when the Council became elective in 1826. During his time as a Council member, he advocated for the Spanish system of slavery that provided for certain rights to free people of color. Kingsley attempted to influence Florida lawmakers to recognize free people of color and allow mixed-race children to inherit property. Kingsley objected to the law passed by the Council that prohibited mixed-race children from inheriting property. The territory did not recognize interracial marriage or polygamous marriages as legal. The year following Kingsley's death, his sister Martha and her children contested his will as "defective and invalid". Kingsley's sister cited Florida law that forbade black people from owning property, and claimed that Anna and Kingsley's other wives had moved to Haiti spontaneously, abandoning the property in Florida to become free people. Anna returned to Florida in 1846 to participate in the Kingsley estate defense, despite the increasingly tense racial climate in Duval County. The court upheld the treaty signed between the U.S. and Spain, stipulating that all free blacks born before 1822 in Florida enjoyed the same legal privileges as they had when Spain controlled East Florida. Anna furthermore asked for, and was granted, the transfer of ownership of slaves who had been sent to the San Jose plantation when the family had moved to Haiti. Her request to rent slaves to other plantations to maximize her profits was rejected by the courts.

== See also ==
- Constitution of Florida
- Florida Territorial Court
