= Samuel St. George Rogers =

American politician

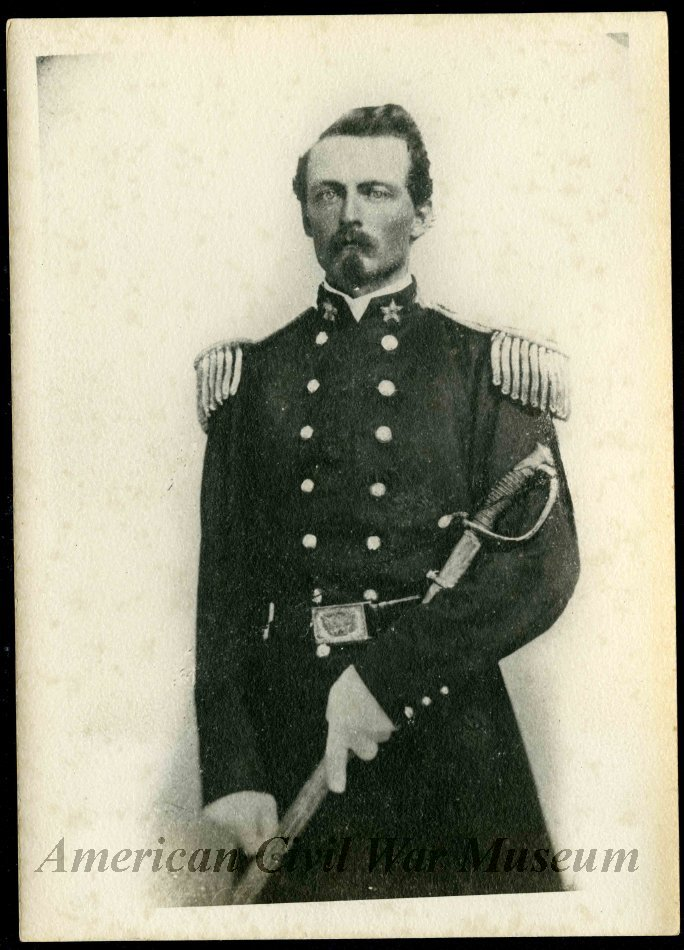
- Born: June 30, 1832; Giles County, Tennessee
- Died: September 11, 1880 (aged 48); Terre Haute, indiana
- Burial place: Crown Hill Cemetery and Arboretum, Section 3, Lot 22, indianapolis, indiana 39.817402°N 86.173227°W
- Spouse: Josephine A. Baynard
- Children: Leonora St. George Rogers Schuyler

Samuel St. George Rogers (June 30, 1832 – September 11, 1880) was a solicitor, an officer in the Confederate Army, a Confederate politician who served in the Confederate States Congress during the American Civil War.

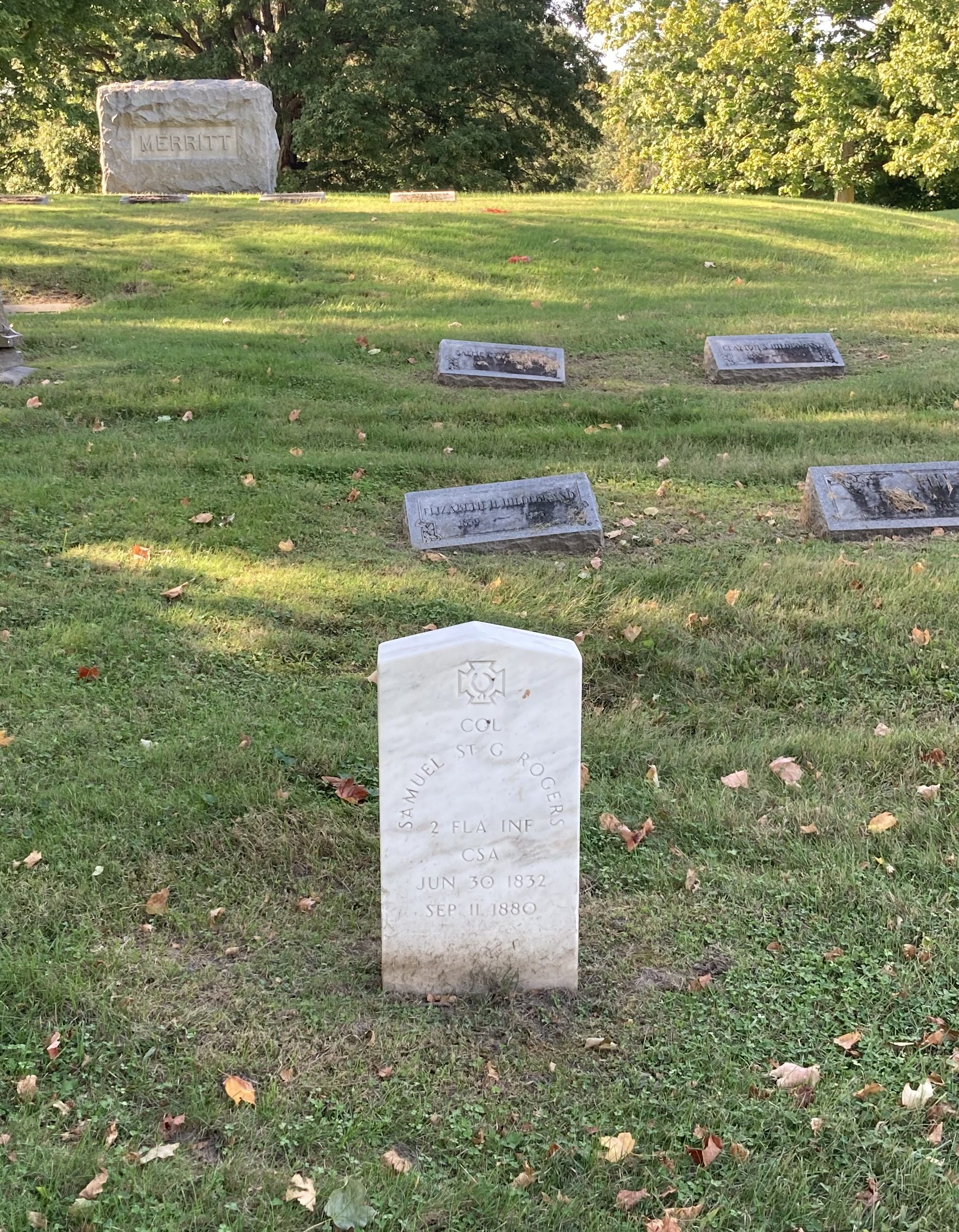
Rogers' grave at Crown Hill Cemetery

He also represented Florida in the Second Confederate Congress from 1864 to 1865.

== Biography ==
Rogers was born in Giles County, Tennessee. He served in the Florida Senate in 1860. He also represented Florida in the Second Confederate Congress from 1864 to 1865.

He died at his son's home in Terre Haute, Indiana on September 11, 1880, and was buried at Crown Hill Cemetery in Indianapolis.
