= Madison S. Perry =

American politician (1814–1865)

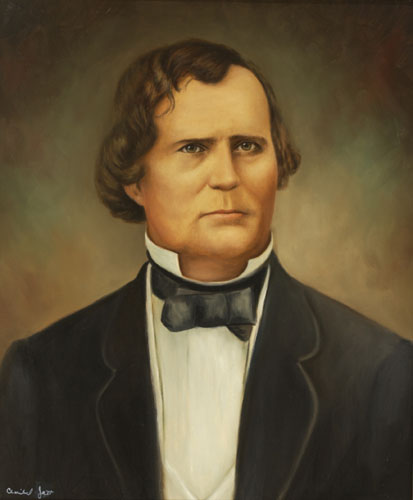

4th Governor of Florida
- In office October 5, 1857 – October 7, 1861
- Preceded by: James E. Broome
- Succeeded by: John Milton

Member of the Florida Senate
- In office 1850

Member of the Florida House of Representatives
- In office 1849

Personal details
- Born: 1814 Lancaster County, South Carolina, US
- Died: March 1865 (aged 50–51) Rochelle, Florida, US
- Party: Democratic
- Spouse: Martha Peay Starke

Military service
- Allegiance: Confederate States
- Branch/service: Confederate States Army
- Years of service: 1861–63
- Rank: Colonel
- Unit: 7th Florida Infantry Regiment

Madison Starke Perry (1814 – March 1865) was the fourth Governor of Florida. Perry's term of office coincided with Florida's secession from the United States in January 1861 and the outbreak of the American Civil War.

== Early life ==
Madison Starke Perry was born in 1814, in Lancaster County, South Carolina, the youngest child of Benjamin Perry and his wife Mary Starke. He attended South Carolina College, where he was a member of the Euphradian Society.

He came to Florida in the 1830s, settling on a plantation in Alachua County and became a leader among the area's plantation owners. He was elected in 1849 to represent the county in the Florida House of Representatives. The following year he was elected to the Florida Senate.

== Perry as governor ==
Perry ran as a Democrat in the 1856 Florida gubernatorial election, winning by a narrow margin and assuming office on October 5, 1857. As Florida's fourth governor, Perry helped bring about the settlement of a long-standing boundary dispute with Georgia and encouraged the building of railways in the state.

In the years leading up to the American Civil War, Perry was a strong supporter of the possibility of secession from the United States to protect slavery. In 1858 he urged the reorganization of the state's militia as sectional tensions rose throughout the country, and following the election of Republican Abraham Lincoln as President in November 1860, he told the Florida legislature that "the only hope the Southern States have for domestic peace and safety...is Secession." Florida then held a secession convention on January 3, 1861, and the state voted to leave the Union on January 10.

While the state secession convention was still debating the matter, Governor Perry sent Florida militia troops to seize the federal arsenal at Chattahoochee, Fort Marion at Saint Augustine, and the navy yard at Pensacola. Florida militia soldiers and troops from other states laid siege to Fort Pickens, which was held by a small federal force. Florida then joined the Confederate States of America on April 22, 1861. During the remaining months of his term, Perry was a strong supporter of the Confederate government, sending 5000 Florida troops to join the Confederate forces while leaving very few militia troops for local defense.

== Last years ==
After his term as governor ended on October 7, 1861, Perry served as colonel of the 7th Florida Infantry Regiment until illness forced his resignation on April 30, 1863. He retired to his plantation in Rochelle, where he died in March 1865, aged 50 or 51, shortly before the end of the American Civil War. Survived by his wife and two children, he was buried in Oak Ridge Cemetery in Rochelle.

The city of Perry, Florida, is named in his honor. The city of Starke, Florida, may have been named in his honor.

== Notes ==
Party political offices
Preceded by James E. Broome	Democratic nominee for Governor of Florida; 1856	Succeeded by John Milton
Political offices
Preceded by James E. Broome	Governor of Florida; October 5, 1857 – October 7, 1861	Succeeded by John Milton
