= George J. Alden =

American politician

George J. Alden (fl. 1860s) was a Florida state senator who became the Florida Secretary of State in 1868. He was involved in a dispute over who was governor when efforts were made to replace Harrison Reed. One account described Alden as "a controversial debt ridden secretary of state... who absconded to Jacksonville with the Great Seal of Florida and used it to try to help Osborn try to impeach Gov. Reed". He was subsequently ousted from office and succeeded by Jonathan Clarkson Gibbs, an African American.

Political offices
Preceded by Benjamin F. Allen	Secretary of State of Florida; 1868	Succeeded by Jonathan Clarkson Gibbs
