= John Marshall Martin =

American politician (1832–1921)

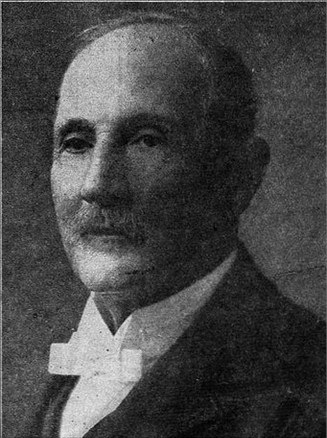
John Marshall Martin

John Marshall Martin (March 18, 1832 – August 10, 1921) was a slaveowner, an officer in the Confederate Army, and a member of the Confederate Congress.

== Biography ==
Martin was born in Edgefield County, South Carolina and moved to Marion County, Florida in the 1850s.

Marion County Tax Book records dated 1860 attribute to Martin the ownership of 3,000 acres of land and 53 enslaved people. Martin used the forced labor of enslaved people to work his plantation, on which cotton, sugar, and rice were grown.

He served in the Confederate Army and represented the state in the First Confederate Congress, replacing James Baird Dawkins, who had resigned.

Martin was Captain of the Marion Light Artillery until he was seriously wounded at the Battle of Richmond. In September 1863, Martin was assigned as commander of the 6th Florida Infantry Battalion. He surrendered under General Robert E. Lee‘s command at Appomattox Court House in 1865. He was also the last survivor of the Confederate Congress.

He is buried in Greenwood Cemetery in Ocala, Florida.

== Notable relatives ==
Martin was the paternal grandfather of the 24th Governor of Florida, John W. Martin, by way of his son, John M. Martin Jr., whom he fathered with his first wife, Willie Wellborn (also spelled Welborn or Welborn).

Martin's second wife was Sallie B. Waldo, daughter of Benjamin Waldo.

Martin's daughter-in-law, Willie Owens Martin, was the daughter of James Byeram Owens.
