= James Baird Dawkins =

American judge (1820–1883)

Member of the Confederate States House of Representatives from Florida
- In office February 18, 1862 – December 8, 1862
- Preceded by: Office established
- Succeeded by: John Marshall Martin

Personal details
- Born: James Baird Dawkins; November 14, 1820 Union County, South Carolina, U.S.
- Died: February 12, 1883 (aged 62)

James Baird Dawkins (November 14, 1820 – February 12, 1883) was an American politician.

He was born in Union County, (now Cherokee County, South Carolina), and later moved to Florida. He represented that state in the First Confederate Congress until he resigned on December 8, 1862. Afterwards he served as a state court judge in Florida from 1863 to 1865 and 1877 to 1883.
