= James E. Broome =

American politician (1808–1883)

James Emilius Broome
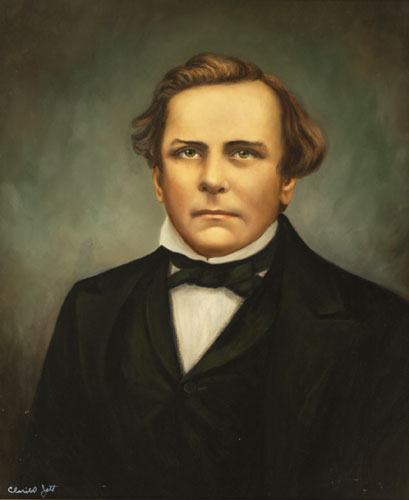

3rd Governor of Florida
- In office October 3, 1853 – October 5, 1857
- Preceded by: Thomas Brown
- Succeeded by: Madison S. Perry

Personal details
- Born: December 15, 1808 Hamburg, Aiken County, South Carolina, US
- Died: November 23, 1883 (aged 74) DeLand, Florida, US
- Party: Democratic
- Spouse(s): Amelia Ann Dozier; Martha (Hawkins) Macon; Henrietta Ann Scott; Adelia Kinnier

James Emilius Broome (December 15, 1808 – November 23, 1883) was an American politician who served as the third governor of Florida from 1853 to 1857.

== Early life and career ==
Broome was born in Hamburg, South Carolina and moved to Florida in 1837. He engaged in the mercantile business until he retired in 1841. In that same year, Governor Richard Keith Call appointed him to the position of Probate Judge of Leon County. He served in that position until 1848.

== Political life ==
He was elected governor in 1852. A Democrat, he took office on October 3, 1853. He was an early States'-Righter. During his term, the Whig Party, the opposition to the Democrats at the time, controlled the Florida State Legislature. He vetoed so many of the bills that were passed by the legislature that he became known as the "Veto Governor". His gubernatorial stint ended on October 5, 1857. Broome served as a member of the Florida Senate in 1861. A large planter, he was very sympathetic to the Confederate cause.

== Marriages ==
James E. Broome was married five times. In 1865, he moved to New York City. On a visit with his son in DeLand, Florida, Broome died in 1883.

Party political offices
Preceded by William Bailey	Democratic nominee for Governor of Florida; 1852	Succeeded by Madison S. Perry
Political offices
Preceded by Thomas Brown	Governor of Florida; October 3, 1853 – October 5, 1857	Succeeded by Madison S. Perry
