= John Milton (Florida politician) =

American politician (1807–1865)

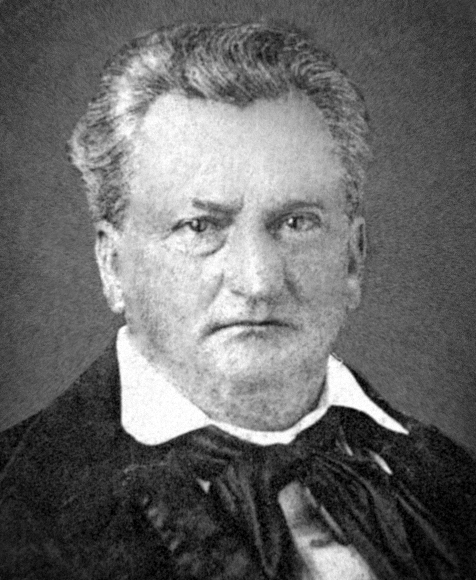

5th Governor of Florida
- In office October 7, 1861 – April 1, 1865
- Preceded by: Madison S. Perry
- Succeeded by: Abraham K. Allison

Member of the Florida House of Representatives
- In office 1850

Personal details
- Born: April 20, 1807 near Louisville, Georgia, U.S.
- Died: April 1, 1865 (aged 57) Marianna, Florida, U.S.
- Party: Democratic
- Spouse(s): Susan Amanda Cobb; Caroline Howze
- Education: University of Georgia
- Profession: Lawyer

John Milton (April 20, 1807 – April 1, 1865) was governor of Florida through most of the American Civil War. A lawyer who served in the Florida Legislature, he supported the secession of Florida from the Union and became governor in October 1861. In that post, he turned the state into a major supplier of food for the Confederacy. In his final message to the state legislature as the war was ending, he declared that death would be preferable to reunion with the North, and died by suicide shortly thereafter.

== Early and personal life ==
Milton descended from a prominent Southern family and was a relative of the famed English poet of the same name.

He was the son of Homer Virgil Milton, an officer who fought in the War of 1812, and the grandson of Revolutionary War veteran, United States presidential candidate of 1789, and former Georgia Secretary of State, John Milton. Born near Louisville, Georgia, Milton graduated from the University of Georgia and later studied law.

He married Susan Cobb in 1826, and they had three children. Following Susan's death, Milton remarried Caroline Howze from Alabama in 1844; they had two sons and seven daughters.

John and Caroline lived in Alabama and New Orleans, before establishing a plantation worked by slave labor in Marianna, Jackson County, Florida in 1845.

Milton's youngest son, Jefferson Davis Milton (1861–1947) moved to Texas, later Arizona. He distinguished himself as a Texas Ranger, police chief of El Paso, and served for over 25 years as America's first border agent. William Hall Milton (1864–1942), grandson of the governor, was a U.S. Senator from Florida from 1908 to 1909.

== Political career ==
In Georgia, Milton ran for Congress in 1833 as a Nullifier candidate, but lost. In 1848, he served as a presidential elector from Florida, then in 1850 was elected to the Florida House of Representatives.

As a supporter and practitioner of slavery, he was an early advocate for secession of Florida from the Union. He was a delegate to the 1860 Democratic National Convention from Florida and was elected Governor in the 1860 election. Milton took the oath of office on October 7, 1861, nine months after Florida had seceded from the Union and joined the Confederacy.

During the Civil War, Milton stressed the importance of Florida as a supplier of goods, rather than manpower, with Florida being a large provider of food and salt for the Confederate Army. However the hardships of war still affected Florida, and by April 1864 many families were on the verge of starvation.

Milton's predecessor, Madison S. Perry had been a strong supporter of the Davis administration's policies, and had sent most of Florida's volunteer forces to join the Confederate States Army. As such, Florida had limited manpower left to defend its extensive coastline when Milton came into office. While other Confederate governors resisted the central government's conscription policies, Milton generally complied and did not seek wide-ranging exemptions to reserve men for service in local militia forces.

Florida was never a strategic priority for either side, but as the war drew to a close and the Confederacy was close to defeat, Milton became worn down by the stress of his office. Governor Milton left Tallahassee for his plantation, Sylvania, in Marianna, Florida. In his final message to the state legislature, he said that the Northern Army leaders "have developed a character so odious that death would be preferable to reunion with them".

On April 1, 1865, his son, William Henry Milton, found the governor dead of a gunshot wound to the head. The president of the Florida Senate, Abraham K. Allison, was sworn in as governor of Florida later that day. Governor John Milton is buried at Saint Luke's Episcopal Cemetery in Marianna.

Party political offices
Preceded by Madison S. Perry	Democratic nominee for Governor of Florida; 1860	Succeeded by David S. Walker
Political offices
Preceded by Madison S. Perry	Governor of Florida; October 7, 1861 – April 1, 1865	Succeeded by Abraham K. Allison
