= Robert Benjamin Hilton =

American politician

Robert Benjamin Hilton (né Smith; 1821 – January 10, 1894) was an American lawyer, newspaper editor, soldier, and Confederate politician who served in the Congress of the Confederate States during the American Civil War.

== Biography ==
Hilton was born in Virginia as Robert Benjamin Smith. He graduated Phi Beta Kappa from Brown University in 1843. He later moved to Tallahassee, Florida, where he established a successful law practice. He legally changed his surname to Hilton in January 1849. Later that year, he and Augustus Maxwell entered the newspaper business when they co-owned and edited the Tallahassee Floridian. They later merged the paper with the Southern Journal to form the Floridian and Journal.

In 1858, he was elected as the Clerk of the Florida House of Representatives.

At the outbreak of the Civil War, he received a commission in April 1861 as the captain of Company D of the 1st Florida Infantry. He subsequently represented the state in the First Confederate Congress and the Second Confederate Congress from 1862 to 1865. He successfully sponsored a bill in January 1864 to withdraw the exemption from military service that had previously been granted to men of military age if they could provide a paid substitute. He also was active in legislation concerning tax limits and funding the Confederate currency.

After the war he served briefly as a state court judge in 1867. He died in Tallahassee and was buried there in St. John's Episcopal Cemetery.

The journal Hilton maintained during the war is in the archives of the University of Florida in Gainesville.
