= Florida Territory =

Organized incorporated territory of the United States (1822–1845)

Territory of Florida
- Organized incorporated territory of United States
- 1822–1845
- Flag

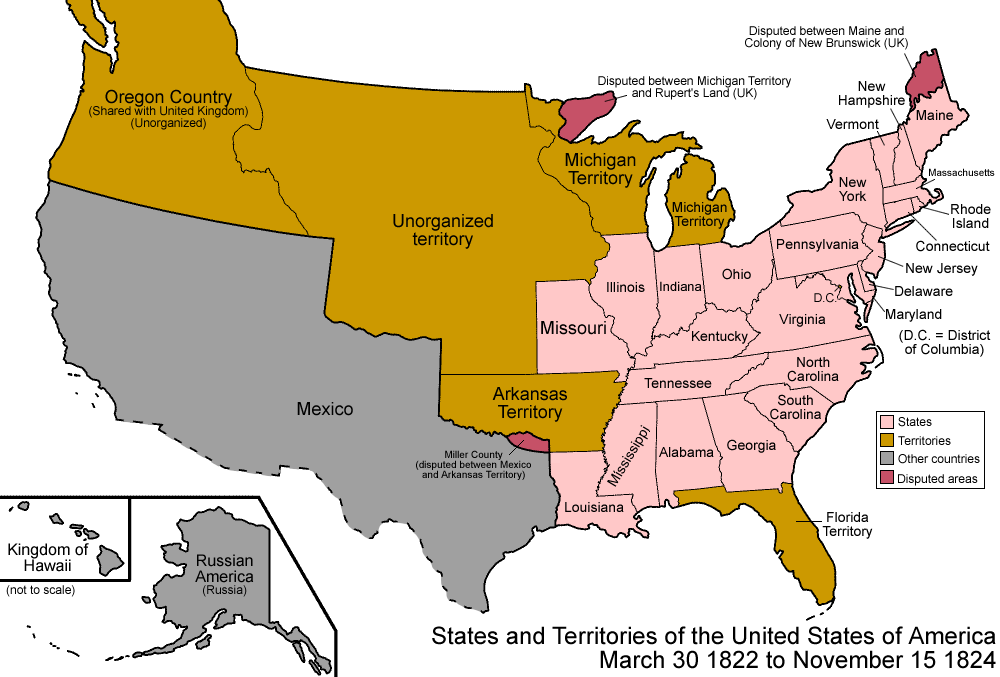
- Capital: 1822–1824; St. Augustine (East Florida/Florida); Pensacola (West Florida); 1824–1845; Tallahassee
- Area
  - Coordinates: 30°N 83°W
- Government
  - Type: Organized incorporated territory
- Governor
  - 1821: Andrew Jackson (military)
  - 1822–1834: William Pope Duval (first)
  - 1834–1836: John Eaton
  - 1836–1839: Richard K. Call
  - 1839–1841: Robert R. Reid
  - 1841–1844: Richard K. Call
  - 1844–1845: John Branch (last)
- History
  - Adams–Onís Treaty: 1821
  - Organized by U.S.: 30 March 1822
  - Statehood: 3 March 1845
Preceded by	Succeeded by
East Florida; West Florida	Florida
- Today part of: United States: Florida

The Territory of Florida was an organized incorporated territory of the United States that existed from March 30, 1822, until March 3, 1845, when it was admitted to the Union as the state of Florida. Originally the major portion of the Spanish territory of La Florida, and later the provinces of East Florida and West Florida, it was ceded to the United States as part of the 1819 Adams–Onís Treaty. It was governed by the Florida Territorial Council.

== Background ==
The first European known to have encountered Florida was Juan Ponce de León, who claimed the land as a possession of Spain in 1513. St. Augustine, the oldest continually inhabited European settlement in the continental U.S., was founded on the northeast coast of Florida in 1565. Florida continued to remain a Spanish possession until the end of the Seven Years' War, when Spain ceded it to the Kingdom of Great Britain in exchange for the release of Havana. In 1783, after the American Revolution, Great Britain ceded Florida back to Spain under the provisions of the Peace of Paris.

The second term of Spanish rule was influenced by the nearby United States. There were border disputes along the boundary with the state of Georgia and issues of American use of the Mississippi River. These disputes were ostensibly solved in 1795 by the Treaty of San Lorenzo, which, among other things, solidified the boundary of Florida and Georgia along the 31st parallel. However, as Thomas Jefferson once predicted, the U.S. could not keep its hands off Florida.

== Pre-1821 American involvement ==
In 1812, United States forces and Georgia "patriots" under General George Mathews unsuccessfully invaded Florida to protect American interests. The "Patriot War" was perceived as ill-advised by many Americans. President James Madison withdrew his support, and the Spanish authorities were promised a speedy exit of the American troops.

The Spanish government offered runaway slaves freedom if they converted to Catholicism and agreed to a term of military service. Under heavy pressure from the U.S., Spain reversed this policy in the late 18th century, to little effect. Slaves continued to flee to Florida, where they were sheltered by the Florida natives, called Seminoles by Americans. They lived in a semi-feudal system; the Seminoles gave the Blacks protection, while the former slaves, who knew how to farm, shared crops with the natives. Although the escaped slaves were still considered inferior by the Seminoles, the two groups lived in relative peace. The slaveholders in Georgia and the rest of the South became furious over this state of affairs as slaves continued to escape to Florida.

In 1818, after years of additional conflicts involving natives, fugitive slaves, and settlers, General Andrew Jackson wrote to President James Monroe, who had been inaugurated in March 1817, informing him that he was invading Florida. Jackson's force departed from Tennessee and marched down to the Florida Panhandle. Spanish officers surrendered coastal fortifications at Fort San Marcos (also known as Fort St. Marks) in Florida Oriental and, about six weeks later, Fort Barrancas and Pensacola in Florida Occidental.

== Adams–Onís Treaty ==
The Adams–Onís Treaty, also known as the Transcontinental Treaty, was signed on February 22, 1819, by John Quincy Adams and Luis de Onís y González-Vara, but did not take effect until after it was ratified by Spain on October 24, 1820, and by the United States on February 19, 1821. The U.S. received Florida under Article 2 and inherited Spanish claims to the Oregon Territory under Article 3, while ceding all its claims on Texas to Spain under Article 3 (with the independence of Mexico in 1821, Spanish Texas became Mexican territory), and pledged to indemnify up to $5,000,000 in claims by American citizens against Spain under Article 11. (Note: The U.S. commission established to adjudicate claims considered some 1800 claims and agreed that they were worth $5,454,545.13. Since the treaty limited the payment of claims to $5 million, the commission reduced the amount paid out proportionately by 8⅓ percent.) Under Article 15, Spanish goods received exclusive most favored nation tariff privileges in the ports at Pensacola and St. Augustine for twelve years.

In Dorr v. United States (195 U.S. 138, 141–142 (1904)) Justice Marshall is quoted more extensively as follows:

The 6th article of the treaty of cession contains the following provision:

'The inhabitants of the territories which His Catholic Majesty cedes the United States by this treaty shall be incorporated in the Union of the United States as soon as may be consistent with the principles of the Federal Constitution, and admitted to the enjoyment of the privileges, rights, and immunities of the citizens of the United States.' [8 Stat. at L. 256.]

[195 U.S. 138, 142] 'This treaty is the law of the land, and admits the inhabitants of Florida to the enjoyment of the privileges, rights, and immunities of the citizens of the United States. It is unnecessary to inquire whether this is not their condition, independent of stipulation. They do not, however, participate in political power; they do not share in the government till Florida shall become a state. In the meantime Florida continues to be a territory of the United States, governed by virtue of that clause in the Constitution which empowers Congress 'to make all needful rules and regulations respecting the territory or other property belonging to the United States."

== Transfer to Governor Andrew Jackson ==
On July 10, 1821, the province of East Florida was transferred to Governor Andrew Jackson with strict orders from President James Monroe to observe diplomatic protocol, with West Florida following one week later. Governor Jackson was not involved in the earliest government appointments in the territory and was only acquainted with two of them.

== Territorial Florida period ==
President James Monroe was authorized by Act of Congress on March 3, 1821, to take possession of East Florida and West Florida for the United States and provide for initial governance. Andrew Jackson served as the federal military commissioner with the powers of governor of the newly acquired territory, from March 10 through December 1821. On March 30, 1822, the United States merged East Florida and part of what formerly constituted West Florida into the Florida Territory. William Pope Duval became the first official governor of the Florida Territory and soon afterward the capital was established at Tallahassee, but only after removing a Seminole tribe from the land. The new capital of Tallahassee was located approximately halfway between the old colonial capitals of Pensacola and St. Augustine. Duval's "government palace for a time was a mere log house, and he lived on hunters' fare."

The central conflict of Territorial Florida originated from attempts to displace the Seminole people. The federal government and most white settlers desired all Florida Indians to migrate to the West voluntarily. On May 28, 1830, Congress passed the Indian Removal Act requiring all Native Americans to move west of the Mississippi River. The Act itself did not mean much to Florida, but it laid the framework for the Treaty of Payne's Landing, which was signed by a council of Seminole chiefs on May 9, 1832, and ratified in 1834. This treaty stated that the Seminoles could organize an exploratory party that would travel to the Indian Territory and survey the assigned lands before they had to agree to relocation, though inhabitants of Florida were expected to relocate by 1835. It was at this meeting that the famous Osceola first voiced his decision to fight. At the Treaty of Fort Gibson, held in Arkansas Territory between the group of Seminoles sent to explore the new territory and the federal government, Americans led the Seminole into agreeing to the terms of relocation, although Seminoles would later claim to having been tricked into this agreement.

Beginning in late 1835, Osceola and the Seminole allies began a guerrilla war against the U.S. forces. Numerous generals fought and failed, succumbing to the heat and disease as well as lack of knowledge of the land. The Seminoles used their knowledge of Florida landscape to their advantage, choosing to fight in swampy areas, because they knew it would expose the American soldiers to diseases such as malaria. Peace talks began in the spring, but the Seminoles broke them off when the "sickly season" began, because they correctly anticipated that the U.S. troops would retreat to the coast. It was not until General Thomas Jesup captured many of the key Seminole chiefs, including Osceola (who died in captivity of illness), that the frequency of battles decreased. The Seminoles were eventually forced to migrate. Florida joined the Union as the 27th state on March 3, 1845. By this time, almost all of the Seminoles were gone, except for a small group living in the Everglades.

A referendum was held in 1837 about statehood with a majority voting in favor of it.

=== Proposed boundary modifications ===
During the territorial period of Florida, it was proposed several times that the territory be either split or that parts of the territory be added to Alabama. Even after Tallahassee was chosen to be the capital because it was halfway between Pensacola and St. Augustine, there was still a feeling of disconnection between East and West Florida because those two cities, which were the two largest settlements when the United States acquired Florida, were 400 miles (640 km) by land and 1,000 miles (1,600 km) by water from each other.

On December 18, 1821, the Alabama state legislature passed a resolution asking the U.S. Congress to annex the portion of Florida west of the Apalachicola River, but nothing materialized from the proposal. Florida's territorial delegate, Joseph Marion Hernández, introduced a resolution on January 28, 1823, that Florida be split into two separate territories, but the resolution was defeated.

In the late 1830s, the proposal to divide the territory picked up traction once again. In January 1839, a committee for the constitutional convention urged the U.S. Congress to consider the idea of Florida statehood, and later that month, a letter was received by Congress from Florida petitioning the Florida Territory be split, which confused Congress. On April 22, 1840, Congress received a petition from several hundred backers in St. Augustine asking to split the territory in two, with the Suwannee River being the dividing line between East and West Florida. Another proposal came from Pensacola that year proposing the Florida Territory west of the Suwannee River be annexed by Alabama. In the spring of 1840, a bill was introduced in Congress to divide the Florida Territory along the Suwannee River but was defeated. The failure of these attempts to split the territory helped lead to the conclusion among those wanting statehood that Florida must be admitted in whole as a single state or remain a territory. A bill was introduced in 1845 in the U.S. House to give statehood to East and West Florida but it was later struck down by a vote of 123 to 77; instead Florida would be admitted as one state and the bill ended up passing in the end by a vote of 145 to 34.

== Government ==
The governor of the Florida Territory was appointed by the U.S. president. Governors had the power to veto legislation and the U.S. Congress also had the power. Florida, similarly to the Orleans Territory, had a unicameral legislature called the Florida Legislative Council, which lasted until 1838 when President Van Buren signed a bill into law replacing the Legislative Council with a Senate and House of Representatives. The council had thirteen members who were selected by the President and confirmed by the U.S. Senate for a one-year term. This changed in 1826 when those who lived in the territory could vote on who they wanted as members of the legislature.

A judicial system was organized by the federal government. Initially in 1822 there were two judicial districts with more judicial districts being created over time. Superior courts existed at the county level but did not exist in every county. Under the superior courts were county courts which not only dealt with judicial matters but also functioned similarly to county commissions.

A constitution was written in the winter of 1838–39 in St. Joseph that was based on the constitutions of several other states. The constitution was later ratified in a referendum held in May 1839.

== Demographics ==
A census was taken in 1825 by the territorial government with a total population of 13,554 being reported with the most populous county being Escambia at 2,837 people. Another was taken in 1838 and the population was reported as being 41,224. However no results were returned for five counties (Mosquito, Nassau, Columbia, Hamilton, and Duval) and no official documents of the census are known to survive with all information coming from newspapers reporting on it. The population estimate when including the other five counties based on "the number of voters in delinquent counties" is placed at 48,831 with 25,173 being white and 23,658 being black.

In the 1830 U.S. Census the largest cities in Florida were: St. Augustine, Tallahassee, and Key West in that order.

During the Seminole Wars many Floridians on the frontier fled to established cities in the territory. Also during the Seminole Wars a policy was practiced called "Suffering inhabitants" where settlers who had fled or had suffered harm from the Seminole Wars could be entitled to aid and compensation.

=== By county ===
In the 1840 United States census, 20 counties in the Florida Territory reported the following population counts (after 15 reported the following counts in the 1830 United States census):

1840 Rank	County	1830 Population	1840 Population
1	Leon	6,494	10,713
2	Gadsden	4,895	5,992
3	Jefferson	–	5,713
4	Jackson	3,907	4,681
5	Duval	1,970	4,156
6	Escambia	3,386	3,993
7	St. Johns	2,538	2,694
8	Madison	525	2,644
9	Alachua	2,204	2,282
10	Columbia	–	2,102
11	Nassau	1,511	1,892
12	Hamilton	553	1,464
13	Walton	1,207	1,461
14	Calhoun	–	1,142
15	Franklin	–	1,030
16	Washington	978	859
17	Monroe	517	688
18	Hillsborough	–	452
19	Dade	–	446
20	Mosquito	733	73
	Florida Territory	34,730	54,477

The census figures mostly count only the American settlers. Often the Seminole people were left out due to their avoiding being counted or just living separately from the settlers.

== Economics ==
Economic development during the territory's history was hindered by the physical environment. American settlers were leery of Florida's climate and diseases, such as malaria and yellow fever. During the Seminole War, far more U.S. soldiers died from malaria and other diseases than from combat.

The economy relied very heavily on cattle ranching. The cows used were a special breed called "Florida Cracker" cattle. These animals were tough and able to handle Florida heat and poor-quality grass because they had descended from cattle brought by the Spanish hundreds of years earlier. The timber industry was also very important, especially in North Florida's pine forests. Starting in the 1830s the timber business grew to become a major part of the economy. Lumbermen and loggers formed a distinct group of workers who would cut down trees for local buildings and to sell elsewhere.

=== Slavery ===
Similarly to the rest of the southeast at the time, the Florida Territory allowed slavery. A slave code was created in 1828. Slavery in Florida "[b]etween 1821 and 1861" could mostly be found in areas where cotton was grown between the Apalachicola and Suwannee Rivers, along the St. Johns River, and near St. Augustine, but an exception to this was along the Manatee River where slaves cultivated and harvested sugarcane. Slavery was much rarer in the southern counties of the territory. The area between the Apalachicola and Suwannee Rivers was referred to as Middle Florida during the territorial period.

=== Transportation ===
During the territorial period both railroads and steamships were introduced to Florida. The first railroad to start on construction was between Tallahassee and St. Marks in 1835 while the first railroad to be built was between Lake Wimico and St. Joseph in 1836. Another railroad was built connecting St. Marks to Tallahassee during the territorial period.

Steamships in Florida served St. Augustine and other coastal locations along with stops on the St. Johns River such as Jacksonville and Palatka. However captains found entering the St. Johns River to be difficult due to a sandbar at the mouth of the river which was a similar situation captains faced entering St. Augustine. During the territorial period there was a proposal to build a canal between one end of the Florida peninsula to the other with the Legislative Council sending a letter to US Congress about the matter and survey teams were dispatched but this canal never went through.

=== Media ===
A number of newspapers were established in the state during the territorial period. Printing continued in Florida when it became a part of the United States. A total of 10 towns were active in printing during the territorial period.

Florida's first newspaper when the United States was in control of Florida was the Florida Gazette from St. Augustine which was published in 1821 by Richard Walker Edes until he died of yellow fever that year. The most prevalent location for newspapers was Tallahassee which had 14 newspapers during the Territorial period.

== See also ==
- Legislative Council of the Territory of Florida
- Adams–Onís Treaty of 1819
- Historic regions of the United States
- History of Florida
- List of governors of Florida
- Seminole Wars, 1817–1858
- Spanish Florida
- Territorial evolution of the United States
- East Florida, 1783–1821
- Republic of East Florida (1812)
- Spanish West Florida, 1783–1821
- Republic of West Florida (1810)
- Zephaniah Kingsley
