= Samuel B. McLin =

American politician

Samuel B. McLin served as Florida Secretary of State from 1873 until 1877, and as a justice of the New Mexico Territorial Supreme Court from 1877 to 1878. He was involved in Florida's delegate counting feud during the disputed 1876 United States presidential election between Republican Rutherford B. Hayes and Democrat Samuel Tilden.

In 1878, The New York Times published an article asserting election improprieties and a conspiracy involving McLin to elect Republican Rutherford B. Hayes as president. McLin served on the Board of Canvassers for the election. A lawsuit alleged the canvassers did not count votes from a few counties and acted illegally. McLin and Florida Comptroller Clayton A. Cowgill, a former Union Army surgeon from Delaware, determined Hayes won the election and Florida Attorney General William Archer Cocke determined that Samuel Tilden won the disputed election. McLin and Cowgill determined the 1876 Florida gubernatorial election for Marcellus Stearns but it was eventually awarded to Democrat George Franklin Drew who had a mansion and mill in Ellaville, Florida.

An 1875 letter of resignation from Justice of the Peace of Hamilton County, Florida to Secretary of State Samuel McInnis written to McLin is in the Florida Archives. John W. Price wrote McLin in 1876 regarding election improprieties.

In March 1877, McLin was appointed to a seat on the New Mexico Territorial Supreme Court.
