= Florida's congressional delegations =

Since Florida became a U.S. state in 1845, it has sent congressional delegations to the United States Senate and United States House of Representatives. Each state elects two senators to serve for six years, and members of the House to two-year terms. Before becoming a state, the Florida Territory elected a non-voting delegate at-large to Congress from 1822 to 1845.

These are tables of congressional delegations from Florida to the United States Senate and the United States House of Representatives.

== Current delegation ==
Current U.S. senators from Florida
Florida CPVI (2025): R+5	Class I senator	Class III senator
Florida CPVI (2025): R+5	Rick Scott (Senior senator) (Naples)	Ashley Moody (Junior senator) (Tampa)
Party	Republican	Republican
Incumbent since	January 8, 2019	January 21, 2025

Florida's current congressional delegation in the 119th Congress consists of its two senators, both of whom are Republicans, and its 28 representatives: 20 Republicans and 7 Democrats and 1 vacancy. Per the 2020 United States census, Florida gained one new congressional seat starting in the 2022 midterms.

The current dean of the Florida delegation is Representative Mario Díaz-Balart of the 26th district, having served in the House since 2003.

Current U.S. representatives from Florida
District	Member (Residence)	Party	Incumbent since	CPVI	District map
1st	Jimmy Patronis (Fort Walton Beach)	Republican	April 2, 2025	R+18	
2nd	Neal Dunn (Panama City)	Republican	January 3, 2017	R+8	
3rd	Kat Cammack (Gainesville)	Republican	January 3, 2021	R+10	
4th	Aaron Bean (Fernandina Beach)	Republican	January 3, 2023	R+5	
5th	John Rutherford (Jacksonville)	Republican	January 3, 2017	R+10	
6th	Randy Fine (Melbourne Beach)	Republican	April 2, 2025	R+14	
7th	Cory Mills (New Smyrna Beach)	Republican	January 3, 2023	R+5	
8th	Mike Haridopolos (Indian Harbour Beach)	Republican	January 3, 2025	R+8	
9th	Darren Soto (Kissimmee)	Democratic	January 3, 2017	R+8	
10th	Maxwell Frost (Orlando)	Democratic	January 3, 2023	D+13	
11th	Daniel Webster (Clermont)	Republican	January 3, 2011	R+7	
12th	Gus Bilirakis (Palm Harbor)	Republican	January 3, 2007	R+7	
13th	Anna Paulina Luna (St. Petersburg)	Republican	January 3, 2023	R+6	
14th	Kathy Castor (Tampa)	Democratic	January 3, 2007	R+4	
15th	Laurel Lee (Tampa)	Republican	January 3, 2023	R+9	
16th	Vern Buchanan (Sarasota)	Republican	January 3, 2007	R+6	
17th	Greg Steube (Sarasota)	Republican	January 3, 2019	R+10	
18th	Scott Franklin (Lakeland)	Republican	January 3, 2021	R+8	
19th	Byron Donalds (Naples)	Republican	January 3, 2021	R+14	
20th	Vacant		April 21, 2026	D+20	
21st	Brian Mast (Fort Pierce)	Republican	January 3, 2017	R+7	
22nd	Lois Frankel (West Palm Beach)	Democratic	January 3, 2013	R+4	
23rd	Jared Moskowitz (Parkland)	Democratic	January 3, 2023	D+9	
24th	Frederica Wilson (Miami Gardens)	Democratic	January 3, 2011	D+22	
25th	Debbie Wasserman Schultz (Weston)	Democratic	January 3, 2005	R+3	
26th	Mario Díaz-Balart (Miami)	Republican	January 3, 2003	R+7	
27th	María Elvira Salazar (Miami)	Republican	January 3, 2021	R+6	
28th	Carlos A. Giménez (Miami)	Republican	January 3, 2021	R+10	

== United States Senate ==
Class I senator	Congress	Class III senator
David Levy Yulee (D)	29th (1845–1847)	James Westcott (D)
David Levy Yulee (D)	30th (1847–1849)	James Westcott (D)
David Levy Yulee (D)	31st (1849–1851)	Jackson Morton (W)
Stephen Mallory (D)	32nd (1851–1853)	Jackson Morton (W)
Stephen Mallory (D)	33rd (1853–1855)	Jackson Morton (W)
Stephen Mallory (D)	34th (1855–1857)	David Levy Yulee (D)
Stephen Mallory (D)	35th (1857–1859)	David Levy Yulee (D)
Stephen Mallory (D)	36th (1859–1861)	David Levy Yulee (D)
American Civil War	36th (1859–1861)	American Civil War
American Civil War	37th (1861–1863)	American Civil War
American Civil War	38th (1863–1865)	American Civil War
American Civil War	39th (1865–1867)	American Civil War
American Civil War	40th (1867–1869)	American Civil War
Adonijah Welch (R)	40th (1867–1869)	Thomas W. Osborn (R)
Abijah Gilbert (R)	41st (1869–1871)	Thomas W. Osborn (R)
Abijah Gilbert (R)	42nd (1871–1873)	Thomas W. Osborn (R)
Abijah Gilbert (R)	43rd (1873–1875)	Simon B. Conover (R)
Charles W. Jones (D)	44th (1875–1877)	Simon B. Conover (R)
Charles W. Jones (D)	45th (1877–1879)	Simon B. Conover (R)
Charles W. Jones (D)	46th (1879–1881)	Wilkinson Call (D)
Charles W. Jones (D)	47th (1881–1883)	Wilkinson Call (D)
Charles W. Jones (D)	48th (1883–1885)	Wilkinson Call (D)
Charles W. Jones (D)	49th (1885–1887)	Wilkinson Call (D)
Samuel Pasco (D)	50th (1887–1889)	Wilkinson Call (D)
Samuel Pasco (D)	51st (1889–1891)	Wilkinson Call (D)
Samuel Pasco (D)	52nd (1891–1893)	Wilkinson Call (D)
Samuel Pasco (D)	53rd (1893–1895)	Wilkinson Call (D)
Samuel Pasco (D)	54th (1895–1897)	Wilkinson Call (D)
Samuel Pasco (D)	55th (1897–1899)	Stephen Mallory II (D)
Samuel Pasco (D)	56th (1899–1901)	Stephen Mallory II (D)
James Taliaferro (D)	56th (1899–1901)	Stephen Mallory II (D)
James Taliaferro (D)	57th (1901–1903)	Stephen Mallory II (D)
James Taliaferro (D)	58th (1903–1905)	Stephen Mallory II (D)
James Taliaferro (D)	59th (1905–1907)	Stephen Mallory II (D)
James Taliaferro (D)	60th (1907–1909)	William James Bryan (D)
James Taliaferro (D)	60th (1907–1909)	William Hall Milton (D)
James Taliaferro (D)	61st (1909–1911)	Duncan U. Fletcher (D)
Nathan P. Bryan (D)	62nd (1911–1913)	Duncan U. Fletcher (D)
Nathan P. Bryan (D)	63rd (1913–1915)	Duncan U. Fletcher (D)
Nathan P. Bryan (D)	64th (1915–1917)	Duncan U. Fletcher (D)
Park Trammell (D)	65th (1917–1919)	Duncan U. Fletcher (D)
Park Trammell (D)	66th (1919–1921)	Duncan U. Fletcher (D)
Park Trammell (D)	67th (1921–1923)	Duncan U. Fletcher (D)
Park Trammell (D)	68th (1923–1925)	Duncan U. Fletcher (D)
Park Trammell (D)	69th (1925–1927)	Duncan U. Fletcher (D)
Park Trammell (D)	70th (1927–1929)	Duncan U. Fletcher (D)
Park Trammell (D)	71st (1929–1931)	Duncan U. Fletcher (D)
Park Trammell (D)	72nd (1931–1933)	Duncan U. Fletcher (D)
Park Trammell (D)	73rd (1933–1935)	Duncan U. Fletcher (D)
Park Trammell (D)	74th (1935–1937)	Duncan U. Fletcher (D)
Scott Loftin (D)	74th (1935–1937)	William Luther Hill (D)
Charles O. Andrews (D)	74th (1935–1937)	Claude Pepper (D)
Charles O. Andrews (D)	75th (1937–1939)	Claude Pepper (D)
Charles O. Andrews (D)	76th (1939–1941)	Claude Pepper (D)
Charles O. Andrews (D)	77th (1941–1943)	Claude Pepper (D)
Charles O. Andrews (D)	78th (1943–1945)	Claude Pepper (D)
Charles O. Andrews (D)	79th (1945–1947)	Claude Pepper (D)
Spessard Holland (D)	79th (1945–1947)	Claude Pepper (D)
Spessard Holland (D)	80th (1947–1949)	Claude Pepper (D)
Spessard Holland (D)	81st (1949–1951)	Claude Pepper (D)
Spessard Holland (D)	82nd (1951–1953)	George Smathers (D)
Spessard Holland (D)	83rd (1953–1955)	George Smathers (D)
Spessard Holland (D)	84th (1955–1957)	George Smathers (D)
Spessard Holland (D)	85th (1957–1959)	George Smathers (D)
Spessard Holland (D)	86th (1959–1961)	George Smathers (D)
Spessard Holland (D)	87th (1961–1963)	George Smathers (D)
Spessard Holland (D)	88th (1963–1965)	George Smathers (D)
Spessard Holland (D)	89th (1965–1967)	George Smathers (D)
Spessard Holland (D)	90th (1967–1969)	George Smathers (D)
Spessard Holland (D)	91st (1969–1971)	Edward Gurney (R)
Lawton Chiles (D)	92nd (1971–1973)	Edward Gurney (R)
Lawton Chiles (D)	93rd (1973–1975)	Edward Gurney (R)
Lawton Chiles (D)	93rd (1973–1975)	Richard Stone (D)
Lawton Chiles (D)	94th (1975–1977)	Richard Stone (D)
Lawton Chiles (D)	95th (1977–1979)	Richard Stone (D)
Lawton Chiles (D)	96th (1979–1981)	Richard Stone (D)
Lawton Chiles (D)	96th (1979–1981)	Paula Hawkins (R)
Lawton Chiles (D)	97th (1981–1983)	Paula Hawkins (R)
Lawton Chiles (D)	98th (1983–1985)	Paula Hawkins (R)
Lawton Chiles (D)	99th (1985–1987)	Paula Hawkins (R)
Lawton Chiles (D)	100th (1987–1989)	Bob Graham (D)
Connie Mack III (R)	101st (1989–1991)	Bob Graham (D)
Connie Mack III (R)	102nd (1991–1993)	Bob Graham (D)
Connie Mack III (R)	103rd (1993–1995)	Bob Graham (D)
Connie Mack III (R)	104th (1995–1997)	Bob Graham (D)
Connie Mack III (R)	105th (1997–1999)	Bob Graham (D)
Connie Mack III (R)	106th (1999–2001)	Bob Graham (D)
Bill Nelson (D)	107th (2001–2003)	Bob Graham (D)
Bill Nelson (D)	108th (2003–2005)	Bob Graham (D)
Bill Nelson (D)	109th (2005–2007)	Mel Martínez (R)
Bill Nelson (D)	110th (2007–2009)	Mel Martínez (R)
Bill Nelson (D)	111th (2009–2011)	Mel Martínez (R)
Bill Nelson (D)	111th (2009–2011)	George LeMieux (R)
Bill Nelson (D)	112th (2011–2013)	Marco Rubio (R)
Bill Nelson (D)	113th (2013–2015)	Marco Rubio (R)
Bill Nelson (D)	114th (2015–2017)	Marco Rubio (R)
Bill Nelson (D)	115th (2017–2019)	Marco Rubio (R)
Rick Scott (R)	116th (2019–2021)	Marco Rubio (R)
Rick Scott (R)	117th (2021–2023)	Marco Rubio (R)
Rick Scott (R)	118th (2023–2025)	Marco Rubio (R)
Rick Scott (R)	119th (2025–2027)	Marco Rubio (R)
Rick Scott (R)	119th (2025–2027)	Ashley Moody (R)
Rick Scott (R)	120th (2027–2029)	Ashley Moody (R)

== United States House of Representatives ==
=== 1822–1845: 1 non-voting delegate ===
Starting on January 23, 1823, Florida Territory sent a non-voting delegate to the House.

Congress	Delegate from Territory's at-large district
17th (1821–1823)	Joseph Marion Hernández (DR)
18th (1823–1825)	Richard K. Call (DR)
19th (1825–1827)	Joseph M. White (J)
20th (1827–1829)	Joseph M. White (J)
21st (1829–1831)	Joseph M. White (J)
22nd (1831–1833)	Joseph M. White (J)
23rd (1833–1835)	Joseph M. White (J)
24th (1835–1837)	Joseph M. White (J)
25th (1837–1839)	Charles Downing (D)
26th (1839–1841)	Charles Downing (D)
27th (1841–1843)	David Levy Yulee (D)
28th (1843–1845)	David Levy Yulee (D)

=== 1845–1873: 1 seat ===
Following statehood on March 3, 1845, Florida had one seat in the House.

Congress	At-large district
29th (1845–1847)	Edward C. Cabell (W)
29th (1845–1847)	William H. Brockenbrough (D)
30th (1847–1849)	Edward C. Cabell (W)
31st (1849–1851)	Edward C. Cabell (W)
32nd (1851–1853)	Edward C. Cabell (W)
33rd (1853–1855)	Augustus Maxwell (D)
34th (1855–1857)	Augustus Maxwell (D)
35th (1857–1859)	George Sydney Hawkins (D)
36th (1859–1861)	George Sydney Hawkins (D)
36th (1859–1861)	American Civil War
37th (1861–1867); 38th (1863–1865); 39th (1865–1867)	American Civil War
40th (1867–1869)	American Civil War
40th (1867–1869)	Charles M. Hamilton (R)
41st (1869–1871)	Charles M. Hamilton (R)
42nd (1871–1873)	Josiah T. Walls (R)
42nd (1871–1873)	Silas L. Niblack (D)

=== 1873–1903: 2 seats ===
Following the 1870 census, Florida was apportioned a second seat.

Congress	At-large	
Congress	Seat 1	Seat 2
43rd (1873–1875)	William J. Purman (R)	Josiah T. Walls (R)
Congress	District	
Congress	1st	2nd
44th (1875–1877)	William J. Purman (R)	Josiah T. Walls (R)
44th (1875–1877)	William J. Purman (R)	Jesse J. Finley (D)
45th (1877–1879)	Robert H. M. Davidson (D)	Horatio Bisbee Jr. (R)
45th (1877–1879)	Robert H. M. Davidson (D)	Jesse J. Finley (D)
46th (1879–1881)	Robert H. M. Davidson (D)	Noble A. Hull (D)
46th (1879–1881)	Robert H. M. Davidson (D)	Horatio Bisbee Jr. (R)
47th (1881–1883)	Robert H. M. Davidson (D)	Jesse J. Finley (D)
47th (1881–1883)	Robert H. M. Davidson (D)	Horatio Bisbee Jr. (R)
48th (1883–1885)	Robert H. M. Davidson (D)	Horatio Bisbee Jr. (R)
49th (1885–1887)	Robert H. M. Davidson (D)	Charles Dougherty (D)
50th (1887–1889)	Robert H. M. Davidson (D)	Charles Dougherty (D)
51st (1889–1891)	Robert H. M. Davidson (D)	Robert Bullock (D)
52nd (1891–1893)	Stephen Mallory II (D)	Robert Bullock (D)
53rd (1893–1895)	Stephen Mallory II (D)	Charles M. Cooper (D)
54th (1895–1897)	Stephen M. Sparkman (D)	Charles M. Cooper (D)
55th (1897–1899)	Stephen M. Sparkman (D)	Robert W. Davis (D)
56th (1899–1901)	Stephen M. Sparkman (D)	Robert W. Davis (D)
57th (1901–1903)	Stephen M. Sparkman (D)	Robert W. Davis (D)

=== 1903–1913: 3 seats ===
Following the 1900 census, Florida was apportioned a third seat.

Congress	District		
Congress	1st	2nd	3rd
58th (1903–1905)	Stephen M. Sparkman (D)	Robert W. Davis (D)	William B. Lamar (D)
59th (1905–1907)	Stephen M. Sparkman (D)	Frank Clark (D)	William B. Lamar (D)
60th (1907–1909)	Stephen M. Sparkman (D)	Frank Clark (D)	William B. Lamar (D)
61st (1909–1911)	Stephen M. Sparkman (D)	Frank Clark (D)	Dannite H. Mays (D)
62nd (1911–1913)	Stephen M. Sparkman (D)	Frank Clark (D)	Dannite H. Mays (D)

=== 1913–1933: 4 seats ===
Following 1910 census, Florida was apportioned 4 seats. From 1913 to 1915 only, an at-large seat was used. Starting in 1915, however, four districts were used.

Congress	District			At-large
Congress	1st	2nd	3rd	At-large
63rd (1913–1915)	Stephen M. Sparkman (D)	Frank; Clark (D)	Emmett; Wilson (D)	Claude L'Engle (D)
64th (1915–1917)	Stephen M. Sparkman (D)	Frank; Clark (D)	Emmett; Wilson (D)	4th district
64th (1915–1917)	Stephen M. Sparkman (D)	Frank; Clark (D)	Emmett; Wilson (D)	William J. Sears (D)
65th (1917–1919)	Herbert J. Drane (D)	Frank; Clark (D)	Walter Kehoe (D)	William J. Sears (D)
66th (1919–1921)	Herbert J. Drane (D)	Frank; Clark (D)	John H. Smithwick (D)	William J. Sears (D)
67th (1921–1923)	Herbert J. Drane (D)	Frank; Clark (D)	John H. Smithwick (D)	William J. Sears (D)
68th (1923–1925)	Herbert J. Drane (D)	Frank; Clark (D)	John H. Smithwick (D)	William J. Sears (D)
69th (1925–1927)	Herbert J. Drane (D)	Lex; Green (D)	John H. Smithwick (D)	William J. Sears (D)
70th (1927–1929)	Herbert J. Drane (D)	Lex; Green (D)	Tom Yon (D)	William J. Sears (D)
71st (1929–1931)	Herbert J. Drane (D)	Lex; Green (D)	Tom Yon (D)	Ruth Bryan; Owen (D)
72nd (1931–1933)	Herbert J. Drane (D)	Lex; Green (D)	Tom Yon (D)	Ruth Bryan; Owen (D)

=== 1933–1943: 5 seats ===
Following the 1930 census, Florida was apportioned 5 seats. From 1933 to 1937 only, an at-large seat was used. Starting in 1937, however, five districts were used.

Congress	District				At-large
Congress	1st	2nd	3rd	4th	At-large
73rd (1933–1935)	J. Hardin; Peterson (D)	Lex; Green (D)	Millard; Caldwell (D)	J. Mark; Wilcox (D)	William J. Sears (D)
74th (1935–1937)	J. Hardin; Peterson (D)	Lex; Green (D)	Millard; Caldwell (D)	J. Mark; Wilcox (D)	William J. Sears (D)
75th (1937–1939)	J. Hardin; Peterson (D)	Lex; Green (D)	Millard; Caldwell (D)	J. Mark; Wilcox (D)	5th district
75th (1937–1939)	J. Hardin; Peterson (D)	Lex; Green (D)	Millard; Caldwell (D)	J. Mark; Wilcox (D)	Joe; Hendricks (D)
76th (1939–1941)	J. Hardin; Peterson (D)	Lex; Green (D)	Millard; Caldwell (D)	Pat Cannon (D)	Joe; Hendricks (D)
77th (1941–1943)	J. Hardin; Peterson (D)	Lex; Green (D)	Bob Sikes (D)	Pat Cannon (D)	Joe; Hendricks (D)

=== 1943–1953: 6 seats ===
Following the 1940 census, Florida was apportioned 6 seats. From 1943 to 1945 only, an at-large seat was used. Starting in 1945, however, six districts were used.

Congress	District					At-large seat
Congress	1st	2nd	3rd	4th	5th	At-large seat
78th (1943–1945)	J. Hardin; Peterson (D)	Emory H. Price (D)	Bob; Sikes (D)	Pat; Cannon (D)	Joe; Hendricks (D)	Lex Green (D)
79th (1945–1947)	J. Hardin; Peterson (D)	Emory H. Price (D)	Bob; Sikes (D)	Pat; Cannon (D)	Joe; Hendricks (D)	6th district
79th (1945–1947)	J. Hardin; Peterson (D)	Emory H. Price (D)	Bob; Sikes (D)	Pat; Cannon (D)	Joe; Hendricks (D)	Dwight; Rogers (D)
80th (1947–1949)	J. Hardin; Peterson (D)	Emory H. Price (D)	Bob; Sikes (D)	George; Smathers (D)	Joe; Hendricks (D)	Dwight; Rogers (D)
81st (1949–1951)	J. Hardin; Peterson (D)	Charles E. Bennett (D)	Bob; Sikes (D)	George; Smathers (D)	Syd; Herlong (D)	Dwight; Rogers (D)
82nd (1951–1953)	Chester McMullen (D)	Charles E. Bennett (D)	Bob; Sikes (D)	Bill Lantaff (D)	Syd; Herlong (D)	Dwight; Rogers (D)

=== 1953–1963: 8 seats ===
Following the 1950 census, Florida was apportioned 8 seats.

Congress	District							
Congress	1st	2nd	3rd	4th	5th	6th	7th	8th
83rd (1953–1955)	Courtney Campbell (D)	Charles E. Bennett (D)	Bob; Sikes (D)	Bill Lantaff (D)	Syd; Herlong (D)	Dwight Rogers (D)	James A. Haley (D)	Billy; Matthews (D)
84th (1955–1957)	William C. Cramer (R)	Charles E. Bennett (D)	Bob; Sikes (D)	Dante; Fascell (D)	Syd; Herlong (D)	Paul; Rogers (D)	James A. Haley (D)	Billy; Matthews (D)
85th (1957–1959)	William C. Cramer (R)	Charles E. Bennett (D)	Bob; Sikes (D)	Dante; Fascell (D)	Syd; Herlong (D)	Paul; Rogers (D)	James A. Haley (D)	Billy; Matthews (D)
86th (1959–1961)	William C. Cramer (R)	Charles E. Bennett (D)	Bob; Sikes (D)	Dante; Fascell (D)	Syd; Herlong (D)	Paul; Rogers (D)	James A. Haley (D)	Billy; Matthews (D)
87th (1961–1963)	William C. Cramer (R)	Charles E. Bennett (D)	Bob; Sikes (D)	Dante; Fascell (D)	Syd; Herlong (D)	Paul; Rogers (D)	James A. Haley (D)	Billy; Matthews (D)

=== 1963–1973: 12 seats ===
Following the 1960 census, Florida was apportioned 12 seats.

Congress	District											
Congress	1st	2nd	3rd	4th	5th	6th	7th	8th	9th	10th	11th	12th
88th (1963–1965)	Bob; Sikes (D)	Charles E. Bennett (D)	Claude; Pepper (D)	Dante; Fascell (D)	Syd Herlong (D)	Paul; Rogers (D)	James A. Haley (D)	Billy; Matthews (D)	Don; Fuqua (D)	Sam; Gibbons (D)	Ed; Gurney (R)	William C. Cramer (R)
89th (1965–1967)	Bob; Sikes (D)	Charles E. Bennett (D)	Claude; Pepper (D)	Dante; Fascell (D)	Syd Herlong (D)	Paul; Rogers (D)	James A. Haley (D)	Billy; Matthews (D)	Don; Fuqua (D)	Sam; Gibbons (D)	Ed; Gurney (R)	William C. Cramer (R)
90th (1967–1969)	Bob; Sikes (D)	Don; Fuqua (D)	Charles E. Bennett (D)	Syd Herlong (D)	Ed Gurney (R)	Sam; Gibbons (D)	James A. Haley (D)	William C. Cramer (R)	Paul; Rogers (D)	J. Herbert; Burke (R)	Claude; Pepper (D)	Dante; Fascell (D)
91st (1969–1971)	Bob; Sikes (D)	Don; Fuqua (D)	Charles E. Bennett (D)	Bill Chappell (D)	Lou Frey (R)	Sam; Gibbons (D)	James A. Haley (D)	William C. Cramer (R)	Paul; Rogers (D)	J. Herbert; Burke (R)	Claude; Pepper (D)	Dante; Fascell (D)
92nd (1971–1973)	Bob; Sikes (D)	Don; Fuqua (D)	Charles E. Bennett (D)	Bill Chappell (D)	Lou Frey (R)	Sam; Gibbons (D)	James A. Haley (D)	Bill Young (R)	Paul; Rogers (D)	J. Herbert; Burke (R)	Claude; Pepper (D)	Dante; Fascell (D)

=== 1973–1983: 15 seats ===
Following the 1970 census, Florida was apportioned 15 seats.

Congress	District														
Congress	1st	2nd	3rd	4th	5th	6th	7th	8th	9th	10th	11th	12th	13th	14th	15th
93rd (1973–1975)	Bob; Sikes (D)	Don; Fuqua (D)	Charles E. Bennett (D)	Bill; Chappell (D)	Bill Gunter (D)	Bill; Young (R)	Sam; Gibbons (D)	James A. Haley (D)	Lou Frey (R)	Skip; Bafalis (R)	Paul; Rogers (D)	J. Hubert; Burke (R)	William; Lehman (D)	Claude; Pepper (D)	Dante; Fascell (D)
94th (1975–1977)	Bob; Sikes (D)	Don; Fuqua (D)	Charles E. Bennett (D)	Bill; Chappell (D)	Richard; Kelly (R)	Bill; Young (R)	Sam; Gibbons (D)	James A. Haley (D)	Lou Frey (R)	Skip; Bafalis (R)	Paul; Rogers (D)	J. Hubert; Burke (R)	William; Lehman (D)	Claude; Pepper (D)	Dante; Fascell (D)
95th (1977–1979)	Bob; Sikes (D)	Don; Fuqua (D)	Charles E. Bennett (D)	Bill; Chappell (D)	Richard; Kelly (R)	Bill; Young (R)	Sam; Gibbons (D)	Andy; Ireland (D)	Lou Frey (R)	Skip; Bafalis (R)	Paul; Rogers (D)	J. Hubert; Burke (R)	William; Lehman (D)	Claude; Pepper (D)	Dante; Fascell (D)
96th (1979–1981)	Earl; Hutto (D)	Don; Fuqua (D)	Charles E. Bennett (D)	Bill; Chappell (D)	Richard; Kelly (R)	Bill; Young (R)	Sam; Gibbons (D)	Andy; Ireland (D)	Bill; Nelson (D)	Skip; Bafalis (R)	Dan; Mica (D)	Ed Stack (D)	William; Lehman (D)	Claude; Pepper (D)	Dante; Fascell (D)
97th (1981–1983)	Earl; Hutto (D)	Don; Fuqua (D)	Charles E. Bennett (D)	Bill; Chappell (D)	Bill McCollum (R)	Bill; Young (R)	Sam; Gibbons (D)	Andy; Ireland (D)	Bill; Nelson (D)	Skip; Bafalis (R)	Dan; Mica (D)	Clay Shaw (R)	William; Lehman (D)	Claude; Pepper (D)	Dante; Fascell (D)

=== 1983–1993: 19 seats ===
Following the 1980 census, Florida was apportioned 19 seats.

Congress	District																		
Congress	1st	2nd	3rd	4th	5th	6th	7th	8th	9th	10th	11th	12th	13th	14th	15th	16th	17th	18th	19th
98th (1983–1985)	Earl; Hutto (D)	Don; Fuqua (D)	Charles E. Bennett (D)	Bill; Chappell (D)	Bill; McCollum (R)	Buddy; MacKay (D)	Sam; Gibbons (D)	Bill; Young (R)	Mike; Bilirakis (R)	Andy; Ireland (D)	Bill; Nelson (D)	Tom; Lewis (R)	Connie; Mack III (R)	Dan; Mica (D)	Clay; Shaw (R)	Lawrence; J. Smith (D)	William; Lehman (D)	Claude; Pepper (D)	Dante; Fascell (D)
99th (1985–1987)	Earl; Hutto (D)	Don; Fuqua (D)	Charles E. Bennett (D)	Bill; Chappell (D)	Bill; McCollum (R)	Buddy; MacKay (D)	Sam; Gibbons (D)	Bill; Young (R)	Mike; Bilirakis (R)	Andy; Ireland (R)	Bill; Nelson (D)	Tom; Lewis (R)	Connie; Mack III (R)	Dan; Mica (D)	Clay; Shaw (R)	Lawrence; J. Smith (D)	William; Lehman (D)	Claude; Pepper (D)	Dante; Fascell (D)
100th (1987–1989)	Earl; Hutto (D)	Bill Grant (D)	Charles E. Bennett (D)	Bill; Chappell (D)	Bill; McCollum (R)	Buddy; MacKay (D)	Sam; Gibbons (D)	Bill; Young (R)	Mike; Bilirakis (R)	Andy; Ireland (R)	Bill; Nelson (D)	Tom; Lewis (R)	Connie; Mack III (R)	Dan; Mica (D)	Clay; Shaw (R)	Lawrence; J. Smith (D)	William; Lehman (D)	Claude; Pepper (D)	Dante; Fascell (D)
101st (1989–1991)	Earl; Hutto (D)	Bill Grant (D)	Charles E. Bennett (D)	Craig; James (R)	Bill; McCollum (R)	Cliff; Stearns (R)	Sam; Gibbons (D)	Bill; Young (R)	Mike; Bilirakis (R)	Andy; Ireland (R)	Bill; Nelson (D)	Tom; Lewis (R)	Porter; Goss (R)	Harry; Johnston (D)	Clay; Shaw (R)	Lawrence; J. Smith (D)	William; Lehman (D)	Claude; Pepper (D)	Dante; Fascell (D)
101st (1989–1991)	Earl; Hutto (D)	Bill Grant (R)	Charles E. Bennett (D)	Craig; James (R)	Bill; McCollum (R)	Cliff; Stearns (R)	Sam; Gibbons (D)	Bill; Young (R)	Mike; Bilirakis (R)	Andy; Ireland (R)	Bill; Nelson (D)	Tom; Lewis (R)	Porter; Goss (R)	Harry; Johnston (D)	Clay; Shaw (R)	Lawrence; J. Smith (D)	William; Lehman (D)	Ileana; Ros-Lehtinen (R)	Dante; Fascell (D)
102nd (1991–1993)	Earl; Hutto (D)	Pete; Peterson (D)	Charles E. Bennett (D)	Craig; James (R)	Bill; McCollum (R)	Cliff; Stearns (R)	Sam; Gibbons (D)	Bill; Young (R)	Mike; Bilirakis (R)	Andy; Ireland (R)	Jim; Bacchus (D)	Tom; Lewis (R)	Porter; Goss (R)	Harry; Johnston (D)	Clay; Shaw (R)	Lawrence; J. Smith (D)	William; Lehman (D)	Ileana; Ros-Lehtinen (R)	Dante; Fascell (D)

=== 1993–2003: 23 seats ===
Following the 1990 census, Florida was apportioned 23 seats.

Congress	District																						
Congress	1st	2nd	3rd	4th	5th	6th	7th	8th	9th	10th	11th	12th	13th	14th	15th	16th	17th	18th	19th	20th	21st	22nd	23rd
103rd (1993–1995)	Earl; Hutto (D)	Pete; Peterson (D)	Corrine; Brown (D)	Tillie; Fowler (R)	Karen; Thurman (D)	Cliff; Stearns (R)	John; Mica (R)	Bill; McCollum (R)	Mike; Bilirakis (R)	Bill; Young (R)	Sam; Gibbons (D)	Charles; Canady (R)	Dan Miller (R)	Porter; Goss (R)	Jim Bacchus (D)	Tom Lewis (R)	Carrie; Meek (D)	Ileana; Ros-Lehtinen (R)	Harry; Johnston (D)	Peter; Deutsch (D)	Lincoln; Díaz-Balart (R)	Clay Shaw (R)	Alcee; Hastings (D)
104th (1995–1997)	Joe Scarborough (R)	Pete; Peterson (D)	Corrine; Brown (D)	Tillie; Fowler (R)	Karen; Thurman (D)	Cliff; Stearns (R)	John; Mica (R)	Bill; McCollum (R)	Mike; Bilirakis (R)	Bill; Young (R)	Sam; Gibbons (D)	Charles; Canady (R)	Dan Miller (R)	Porter; Goss (R)	Dave Weldon (R)	Mark Foley (R)	Carrie; Meek (D)	Ileana; Ros-Lehtinen (R)	Harry; Johnston (D)	Peter; Deutsch (D)	Lincoln; Díaz-Balart (R)	Clay Shaw (R)	Alcee; Hastings (D)
105th (1997–1999)	Joe Scarborough (R)	Allen Boyd (D)	Corrine; Brown (D)	Tillie; Fowler (R)	Karen; Thurman (D)	Cliff; Stearns (R)	John; Mica (R)	Bill; McCollum (R)	Mike; Bilirakis (R)	Bill; Young (R)	Jim Davis (D)	Charles; Canady (R)	Dan Miller (R)	Porter; Goss (R)	Dave Weldon (R)	Mark Foley (R)	Carrie; Meek (D)	Ileana; Ros-Lehtinen (R)	Robert; Wexler (D)	Peter; Deutsch (D)	Lincoln; Díaz-Balart (R)	Clay Shaw (R)	Alcee; Hastings (D)
106th (1999–2001)	Joe Scarborough (R)	Allen Boyd (D)	Corrine; Brown (D)	Tillie; Fowler (R)	Karen; Thurman (D)	Cliff; Stearns (R)	John; Mica (R)	Bill; McCollum (R)	Mike; Bilirakis (R)	Bill; Young (R)	Jim Davis (D)	Charles; Canady (R)	Dan Miller (R)	Porter; Goss (R)	Dave Weldon (R)	Mark Foley (R)	Carrie; Meek (D)	Ileana; Ros-Lehtinen (R)	Robert; Wexler (D)	Peter; Deutsch (D)	Lincoln; Díaz-Balart (R)	Clay Shaw (R)	Alcee; Hastings (D)
107th (2001–2003)	Joe Scarborough (R)	Allen Boyd (D)	Corrine; Brown (D)	Ander; Crenshaw (R)	Karen; Thurman (D)	Cliff; Stearns (R)	John; Mica (R)	Ric Keller (R)	Mike; Bilirakis (R)	Bill; Young (R)	Jim Davis (D)	Adam Putnam (R)	Dan Miller (R)	Porter; Goss (R)	Dave Weldon (R)	Mark Foley (R)	Carrie; Meek (D)	Ileana; Ros-Lehtinen (R)	Robert; Wexler (D)	Peter; Deutsch (D)	Lincoln; Díaz-Balart (R)	Clay Shaw (R)	Alcee; Hastings (D)
107th (2001–2003)	Jeff Miller (R)	Allen Boyd (D)	Corrine; Brown (D)	Ander; Crenshaw (R)	Karen; Thurman (D)	Cliff; Stearns (R)	John; Mica (R)	Ric Keller (R)	Mike; Bilirakis (R)	Bill; Young (R)	Jim Davis (D)	Adam Putnam (R)	Dan Miller (R)	Porter; Goss (R)	Dave Weldon (R)	Mark Foley (R)	Carrie; Meek (D)	Ileana; Ros-Lehtinen (R)	Robert; Wexler (D)	Peter; Deutsch (D)	Lincoln; Díaz-Balart (R)	Clay Shaw (R)	Alcee; Hastings (D)

=== 2003–2013: 25 seats ===
Following the 2000 census, Florida was apportioned 25 seats.

Congress	District																								
Congress	1st	2nd	3rd	4th	5th	6th	7th	8th	9th	10th	11th	12th	13th	14th	15th	16th	17th	18th	19th	20th	21st	22nd	23rd	24th	25th
108th (2003–2005)	Jeff Miller (R)	Allen Boyd (D)	Corrine Brown (D)	Ander Crenshaw (R)	Ginny Brown-Waite (R)	Cliff Stearns (R)	John Mica (R)	Ric Keller (R)	Mike Bilirakis (R)	Bill Young (R)	Jim Davis (D)	Adam Putnam (R)	Katherine Harris (R)	Porter Goss (R)	Dave Weldon (R)	Mark Foley (R)	Kendrick Meek (D)	Ileana Ros-Lehtinen (R)	Robert Wexler (D)	Peter Deutsch (D)	Lincoln Díaz-Balart (R)	Clay Shaw (R)	Alcee Hastings (D)	Tom Feeney (R)	Mario Díaz-Balart (R)
109th (2005–2007)	Jeff Miller (R)	Allen Boyd (D)	Corrine Brown (D)	Ander Crenshaw (R)	Ginny Brown-Waite (R)	Cliff Stearns (R)	John Mica (R)	Ric Keller (R)	Mike Bilirakis (R)	Bill Young (R)	Jim Davis (D)	Adam Putnam (R)	Katherine Harris (R)	Connie Mack IV (R)	Dave Weldon (R)	Mark Foley (R)	Kendrick Meek (D)	Ileana Ros-Lehtinen (R)	Robert Wexler (D)	Debbie Wasserman Schultz (D)	Lincoln Díaz-Balart (R)	Clay Shaw (R)	Alcee Hastings (D)	Tom Feeney (R)	Mario Díaz-Balart (R)
110th (2007–2009)	Jeff Miller (R)	Allen Boyd (D)	Corrine Brown (D)	Ander Crenshaw (R)	Ginny Brown-Waite (R)	Cliff Stearns (R)	John Mica (R)	Ric Keller (R)	Gus Bilirakis (R)	Bill Young (R)	Kathy Castor (D)	Adam Putnam (R)	Vern Buchanan (R)	Connie Mack IV (R)	Dave Weldon (R)	Tim Mahoney (D)	Kendrick Meek (D)	Ileana Ros-Lehtinen (R)	Robert Wexler (D)	Debbie Wasserman Schultz (D)	Lincoln Díaz-Balart (R)	Ron Klein (D)	Alcee Hastings (D)	Tom Feeney (R)	Mario Díaz-Balart (R)
111th (2009–2011)	Jeff Miller (R)	Allen Boyd (D)	Corrine Brown (D)	Ander Crenshaw (R)	Ginny Brown-Waite (R)	Cliff Stearns (R)	John Mica (R)	Alan Grayson (D)	Gus Bilirakis (R)	Bill Young (R)	Kathy Castor (D)	Adam Putnam (R)	Vern Buchanan (R)	Connie Mack IV (R)	Bill Posey (R)	Tom Rooney (R)	Kendrick Meek (D)	Ileana Ros-Lehtinen (R)	Robert Wexler (D)	Debbie Wasserman Schultz (D)	Lincoln Díaz-Balart (R)	Ron Klein (D)	Alcee Hastings (D)	Suzanne Kosmas (D)	Mario Díaz-Balart (R)
112th (2011–2013)	Jeff Miller (R)	Steve Southerland (R)	Corrine Brown (D)	Ander Crenshaw (R)	Rich Nugent (R)	Cliff Stearns (R)	John Mica (R)	Daniel Webster (R)	Gus Bilirakis (R)	Bill Young (R)	Kathy Castor (D)	Dennis Ross (R)	Vern Buchanan (R)	Connie Mack IV (R)	Bill Posey (R)	Tom Rooney (R)	Frederica Wilson (D)	Ileana Ros-Lehtinen (R)	Ted Deutch (D)	Debbie Wasserman Schultz (D)	Mario Díaz-Balart (R)	Allen West (R)	Alcee Hastings (D)	Sandy Adams (R)	David Rivera (R)

=== 2013–2023: 27 seats ===
Following the 2010 census, Florida was apportioned 27 seats.

Congress
113th
(2013–2015)
114th
(2015–2017)
115th
(2017–2019)
116th
(2019–2021)
117th
(2021–2023)

District										District										District							Congress
1st	2nd	3rd	4th	5th	6th	7th	8th	9th	10th	11th	12th	13th	14th	15th	16th	17th	18th	19th	20th	21st	22nd	23rd	24th	25th	26th	27th	Congress
Jeff; Miller (R)	Steve; Souther- land (R)	Ted; Yoho (R)	Ander; Crenshaw (R)	Corrine; Brown (D)	Ron; DeSantis (R)	John; Mica (R)	Bill; Posey (R)	Alan; Grayson (D)	Daniel; Webster (R)	Rich; Nugent (R)	Gus; Bilirakis (R)	Bill; Young (R)	Kathy; Castor (D)	Dennis; Ross (R)	Vern; Buchanan (R)	Tom; Rooney (R)	Patrick; Murphy (D)	Trey; Radel (R)	Alcee; Hastings (D)	Ted; Deutch (D)	Lois; Frankel (D)	Debbie; Wasserman; Schultz (D)	Frederica; Wilson (D)	Mario; Díaz- Balart (R)	Joe; Garcia (D)	Ileana; Ros- Lehtinen (R)	113th (2013–2015)
Jeff; Miller (R)	Steve; Souther- land (R)	Ted; Yoho (R)	Ander; Crenshaw (R)	Corrine; Brown (D)	Ron; DeSantis (R)	John; Mica (R)	Bill; Posey (R)	Alan; Grayson (D)	Daniel; Webster (R)	Rich; Nugent (R)	Gus; Bilirakis (R)	David; Jolly (R)	Kathy; Castor (D)	Dennis; Ross (R)	Vern; Buchanan (R)	Tom; Rooney (R)	Patrick; Murphy (D)	Curt; Clawson (R)	Alcee; Hastings (D)	Ted; Deutch (D)	Lois; Frankel (D)	Debbie; Wasserman; Schultz (D)	Frederica; Wilson (D)	Mario; Díaz- Balart (R)	Joe; Garcia (D)	Ileana; Ros- Lehtinen (R)	113th (2013–2015)
Jeff; Miller (R)	Gwen; Graham (D)	Ted; Yoho (R)	Ander; Crenshaw (R)	Corrine; Brown (D)	Ron; DeSantis (R)	John; Mica (R)	Bill; Posey (R)	Alan; Grayson (D)	Daniel; Webster (R)	Rich; Nugent (R)	Gus; Bilirakis (R)	David; Jolly (R)	Kathy; Castor (D)	Dennis; Ross (R)	Vern; Buchanan (R)	Tom; Rooney (R)	Patrick; Murphy (D)	Curt; Clawson (R)	Alcee; Hastings (D)	Ted; Deutch (D)	Lois; Frankel (D)	Debbie; Wasserman; Schultz (D)	Frederica; Wilson (D)	Mario; Díaz- Balart (R)	Carlos; Curbelo (R)	Ileana; Ros- Lehtinen (R)	114th (2015–2017)
Matt; Gaetz (R)	Neal; Dunn (R)	Ted; Yoho (R)	John; Rutherford (R)	Al; Lawson (D)	Ron; DeSantis (R)	Stephanie; Murphy (D)	Bill; Posey (R)	Darren; Soto (D)	Val; Demings (D)	Daniel; Webster (R)	Gus; Bilirakis (R)	Charlie; Crist (D)	Kathy; Castor (D)	Dennis; Ross (R)	Vern; Buchanan (R)	Tom; Rooney (R)	Brian; Mast (R)	Francis; Rooney (R)	Alcee; Hastings (D)	Lois; Frankel (D)	Ted; Deutch (D)	Debbie; Wasserman; Schultz (D)	Frederica; Wilson (D)	Mario; Díaz- Balart (R)	Carlos; Curbelo (R)	Ileana; Ros- Lehtinen (R)	115th (2017–2019)
Matt; Gaetz (R)	Neal; Dunn (R)	Ted; Yoho (R)	John; Rutherford (R)	Al; Lawson (D)	Mike; Waltz (R)	Stephanie; Murphy (D)	Bill; Posey (R)	Darren; Soto (D)	Val; Demings (D)	Daniel; Webster (R)	Gus; Bilirakis (R)	Charlie; Crist (D)	Kathy; Castor (D)	Ross; Spano (R)	Vern; Buchanan (R)	Greg; Steube (R)	Brian; Mast (R)	Francis; Rooney (R)	Alcee; Hastings (D)	Lois; Frankel (D)	Ted; Deutch (D)	Debbie; Wasserman; Schultz (D)	Frederica; Wilson (D)	Mario; Díaz- Balart (R)	Debbie Mucarsel- Powell (D)	Donna; Shalala (D)	116th (2019–2021)
Matt; Gaetz (R)	Neal; Dunn (R)	Kat Cam- mack (R)	John; Rutherford (R)	Al; Lawson (D)	Mike; Waltz (R)	Stephanie; Murphy (D)	Bill; Posey (R)	Darren; Soto (D)	Val; Demings (D)	Daniel; Webster (R)	Gus; Bilirakis (R)	Charlie; Crist (D)	Kathy; Castor (D)	Scott; Franklin (R)	Vern; Buchanan (R)	Greg; Steube (R)	Brian; Mast (R)	Byron; Donalds (R)	Alcee; Hastings (D)	Lois; Frankel (D)	Ted; Deutch (D)	Debbie; Wasserman; Schultz (D)	Frederica; Wilson (D)	Mario; Díaz- Balart (R)	Carlos A. Giménez (R)	María Elvira; Salazar (R)	117th (2021–2023)
Matt; Gaetz (R)	Neal; Dunn (R)	Kat Cam- mack (R)	John; Rutherford (R)	Al; Lawson (D)	Mike; Waltz (R)	Stephanie; Murphy (D)	Bill; Posey (R)	Darren; Soto (D)	Val; Demings (D)	Daniel; Webster (R)	Gus; Bilirakis (R)	Vacant	Kathy; Castor (D)	Scott; Franklin (R)	Vern; Buchanan (R)	Greg; Steube (R)	Brian; Mast (R)	Byron; Donalds (R)	Sheila Cherfilus- McCormick (D)	Lois; Frankel (D)	Vacant	Debbie; Wasserman; Schultz (D)	Frederica; Wilson (D)	Mario; Díaz- Balart (R)	Carlos A. Giménez (R)	María Elvira; Salazar (R)	117th (2021–2023)

=== From 2023: 28 seats ===
Following the 2020 census, Florida was apportioned 28 seats.

Congress
118th
(2023–2025)
119th
(2025–2027)
120th
(2027–2029)

District										District										District								Congress
1st	2nd	3rd	4th	5th	6th	7th	8th	9th	10th	11th	12th	13th	14th	15th	16th	17th	18th	19th	20th	21st	22nd	23rd	24th	25th	26th	27th	28th	Congress
Matt; Gaetz (R)	Neal; Dunn (R)	Kat; Cammack (R)	Aaron; Bean (R)	John; Rutherford (R)	Mike; Waltz (R)	Cory; Mills (R)	Bill; Posey (R)	Darren; Soto (D)	Maxwell; Frost (D)	Daniel; Webster (R)	Gus; Bilirakis (R)	Anna; Paulina; Luna (R)	Kathy; Castor (D)	Laurel; Lee (R)	Vern; Buchanan (R)	Greg; Steube (R)	Scott; Franklin (R)	Byron; Donalds (R)	Sheila; Cherfilus- McCormick (D)	Brian; Mast (R)	Lois; Frankel (D)	Jared; Moskowitz (D)	Frederica; Wilson (D)	Debbie; Wasserman; Schultz (D)	Mario; Díaz- Balart (R)	María; Elvira; Salazar (R)	Carlos A. Giménez (R)	118th (2023–2025)
vacant	Neal; Dunn (R)	Kat; Cammack (R)	Aaron; Bean (R)	John; Rutherford (R)	Mike; Waltz (R)	Cory; Mills (R)	Bill; Posey (R)	Darren; Soto (D)	Maxwell; Frost (D)	Daniel; Webster (R)	Gus; Bilirakis (R)	Anna; Paulina; Luna (R)	Kathy; Castor (D)	Laurel; Lee (R)	Vern; Buchanan (R)	Greg; Steube (R)	Scott; Franklin (R)	Byron; Donalds (R)	Sheila; Cherfilus- McCormick (D)	Brian; Mast (R)	Lois; Frankel (D)	Jared; Moskowitz (D)	Frederica; Wilson (D)	Debbie; Wasserman; Schultz (D)	Mario; Díaz- Balart (R)	María; Elvira; Salazar (R)	Carlos A. Giménez (R)	118th (2023–2025)
vacant	Neal; Dunn (R)	Kat; Cammack (R)	Aaron; Bean (R)	John; Rutherford (R)	Mike; Waltz (R)	Cory; Mills (R)	Mike; Haridopolos (R)	Darren; Soto (D)	Maxwell; Frost (D)	Daniel; Webster (R)	Gus; Bilirakis (R)	Anna; Paulina; Luna (R)	Kathy; Castor (D)	Laurel; Lee (R)	Vern; Buchanan (R)	Greg; Steube (R)	Scott; Franklin (R)	Byron; Donalds (R)	Sheila; Cherfilus- McCormick (D)	Brian; Mast (R)	Lois; Frankel (D)	Jared; Moskowitz (D)	Frederica; Wilson (D)	Debbie; Wasserman; Schultz (D)	Mario; Díaz- Balart (R)	María; Elvira; Salazar (R)	Carlos A. Giménez (R)	119th (2025–2027)
Jimmy; Patronis (R)	Neal; Dunn (R)	Kat; Cammack (R)	Aaron; Bean (R)	John; Rutherford (R)	Randy; Fine (R)	Cory; Mills (R)	Mike; Haridopolos (R)	Darren; Soto (D)	Maxwell; Frost (D)	Daniel; Webster (R)	Gus; Bilirakis (R)	Anna; Paulina; Luna (R)	Kathy; Castor (D)	Laurel; Lee (R)	Vern; Buchanan (R)	Greg; Steube (R)	Scott; Franklin (R)	Byron; Donalds (R)	vacant	Brian; Mast (R)	Lois; Frankel (D)	Jared; Moskowitz (D)	Frederica; Wilson (D)	Debbie; Wasserman; Schultz (D)	Mario; Díaz- Balart (R)	María; Elvira; Salazar (R)	Carlos A. Giménez (R)	119th (2025–2027)
Jimmy; Patronis (R)	Austin; Rogers (R)	Kat; Cammack (R)	Aaron; Bean (R)	John; Rutherford (R)	Randy; Fine (R)	Ryan; Elijah (R)	Mike; Haridopolos (R)	Darren; Soto (D)	Maxwell; Frost (D)	Joe; Strada (R)	Gus; Bilirakis (R)	Anna; Paulina; Luna (R)	Kathy; Castor (D)	Laurel; Lee (R)	Sydney; Gruters (R)	Greg; Steube (R)	Scott; Franklin (R)	Jim; Schwartzel (R)	Debbie; Wasserman Schultz (R)	Brian; Mast (R)	Pia; Dandiya (D)	Lois; Frankel (R)	Oliver; Gilbert (D)	Jared; Moskowitz (D)	Mario; Díaz- Balart (R)	María; Elvira; Salazar (R)	Carlos A. Giménez (R)	120th (2027–2029)

== Key ==
Democratic (D)
Democratic-Republican (DR)
Jacksonian (J)
Republican (R)
Whig (W)

== See also ==
- List of United States congressional districts
- Florida's congressional districts
- Political party strength in Florida
