= 1884 United States House of Representatives elections in Florida =

United States House of Representatives elections in Florida, 1884
- November 4, 1884

Both of Florida's seats to the United States House of Representatives
	Majority party	Minority party
Party	Democratic	Republican
Last election	1	1
Seats won	2	0
Seat change	▲1	▼1
Popular vote	31,867	27,971
Percentage	53.3%	46.7%

The 1884 United States House of Representatives elections in Florida were held on November 4 for the 49th Congress. These elections were held at the same time as the presidential election and the election for governor.

== Background ==
The 1882 elections had sent one Democrat and one Republican to the House to represent Florida. That would prove to be the last Congressional election won by a Republican in Florida until 1954.

== Election results ==
Both incumbents ran for re-election, one of whom was re-elected. One seat changed from Republican to Democratic control

1884 United States House election results
District	Democratic			Republican			Independent Republican		
1st	Robert H. M. Davidson (I)	14,619	55.1%	Eugene O. Locke	11,899	44.9%			
2nd	Charles Dougherty	17,248	51.8%	Horatio Bisbee, Jr. (I)	15,857	47.6%	Josiah T. Walls	215	0.6%

== 1st District ==
United States House of Representatives election in Florida 1st congressional district, 1884
- November 4, 1884
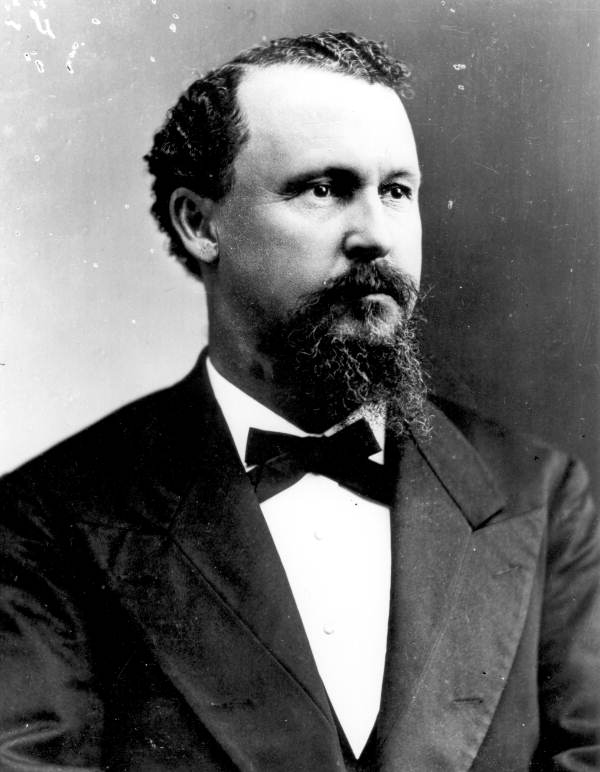

Nominee	Robert H. M. Davidson	Eugene O. Locke
Party	Democratic	Republican
Popular vote	14,619	11,899
Percentage	55.13%	44.87%
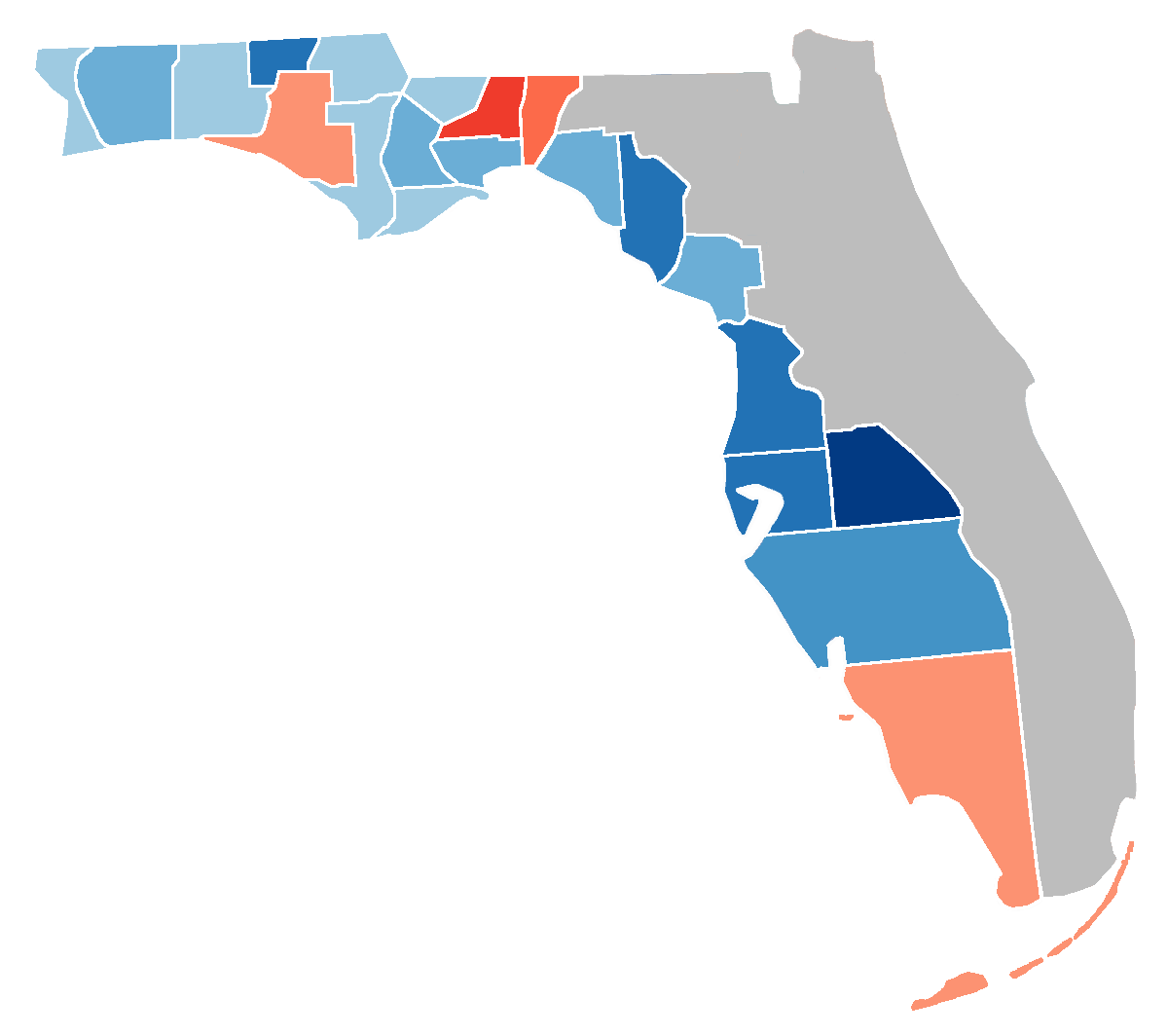
County Results
Davidson
50–59%
60–69%
70–79%
80–89%
90–100%
Locke
50–59%
60–69%
70–79%

1884 United States House election 1st District results
Democratic			Republican		
Robert H. M. Davidson (I)	14,619	55.13%	Eugene O. Locke	11,899	44.87%

=== Results ===
County	Robert H. M. Davidson Democratic		Eugene O. Locke Republican		Total votes
County	#	%	#	%	Total votes
Calhoun	196	57.82%	143	42.18%	339
Escambia	1,873	50.03%	1,871	49.97%	3,744
Franklin	276	56.10%	216	43.90%	492
Gadsden	1,064	54.76%	879	45.24%	1,943
Hernando	1,258	77.99%	355	22.01%	1,613
Hillsborough	1,061	80.75%	253	19.25%	1,314
Holmes	385	83.70%	75	16.30%	460
Jackson	1,420	55.32%	1,147	44.68%	2,567
Jefferson	744	32.65%	1,535	67.35%	2,279
Lafayette	383	88.86%	48	11.14%	431
Leon	837	27.61%	2,194	72.39%	3,031
Levy	658	65.87%	341	34.13%	999
Liberty	161	62.65%	96	37.35%	257
Manatee	673	76.05%	212	23.95%	885
Monroe	747	41.64%	1,047	58.36%	1,794
Polk	761	92.92%	58	7.08%	819
Santa Rosa	804	62.96%	473	37.04%	1,277
Taylor	212	61.27%	134	38.73%	346
Wakulla	375	68.93%	169	31.07%	544
Walton	464	55.24%	376	44.76%	840
Washington	267	49.08%	277	50.92%	544
Totals	14,619	55.13%	11,899	44.87%	26,518

== 2nd District ==
United States House of Representatives election in Florida 2nd congressional district, 1884
- November 4, 1884
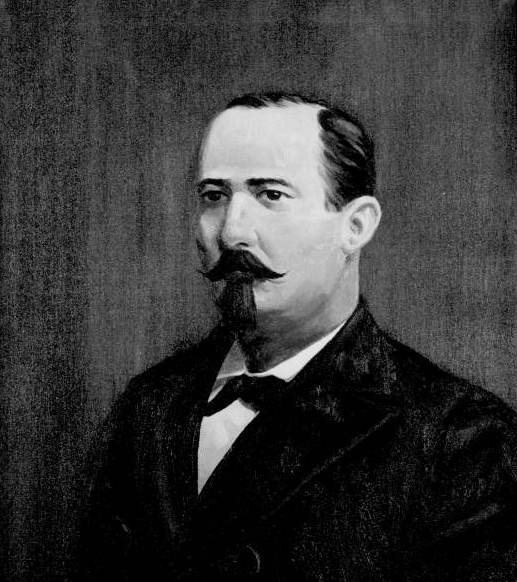

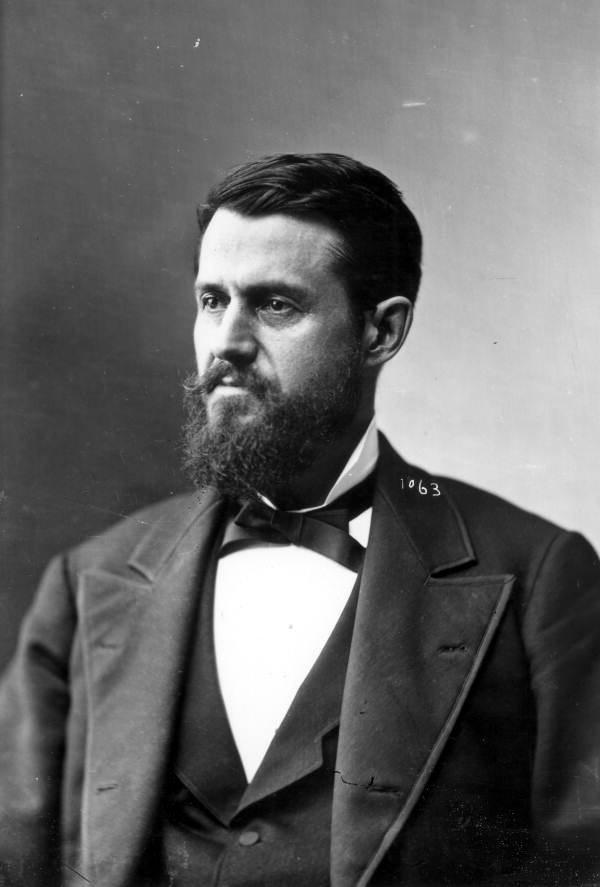

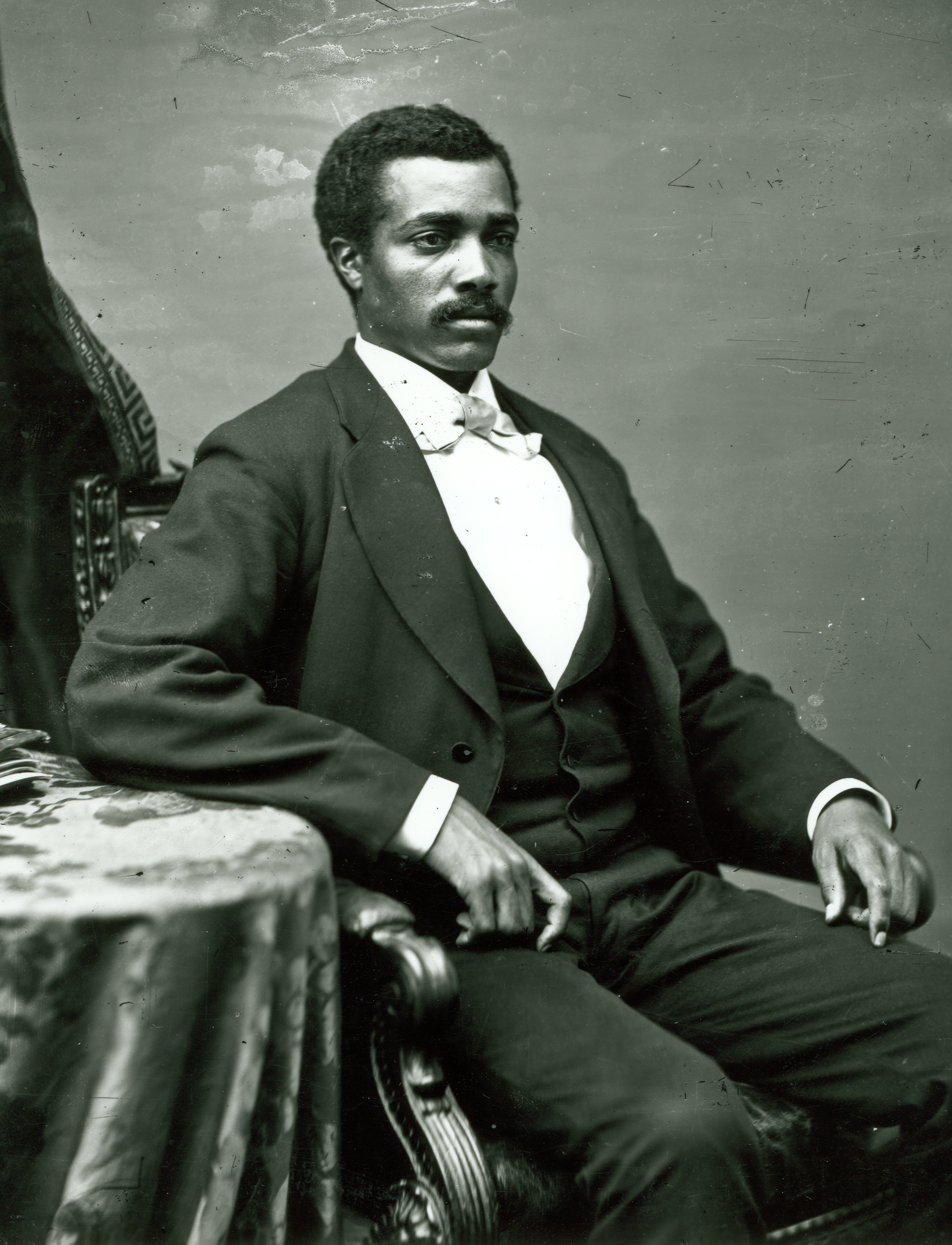
Nominee	Charles Dougherty	Horatio Bisbee, Jr.	Josiah T. Walls
Party	Democratic	Republican	Independent Republican
Popular vote	17,248	15,857	215
Percentage	51.76%	47.59%	0.65%
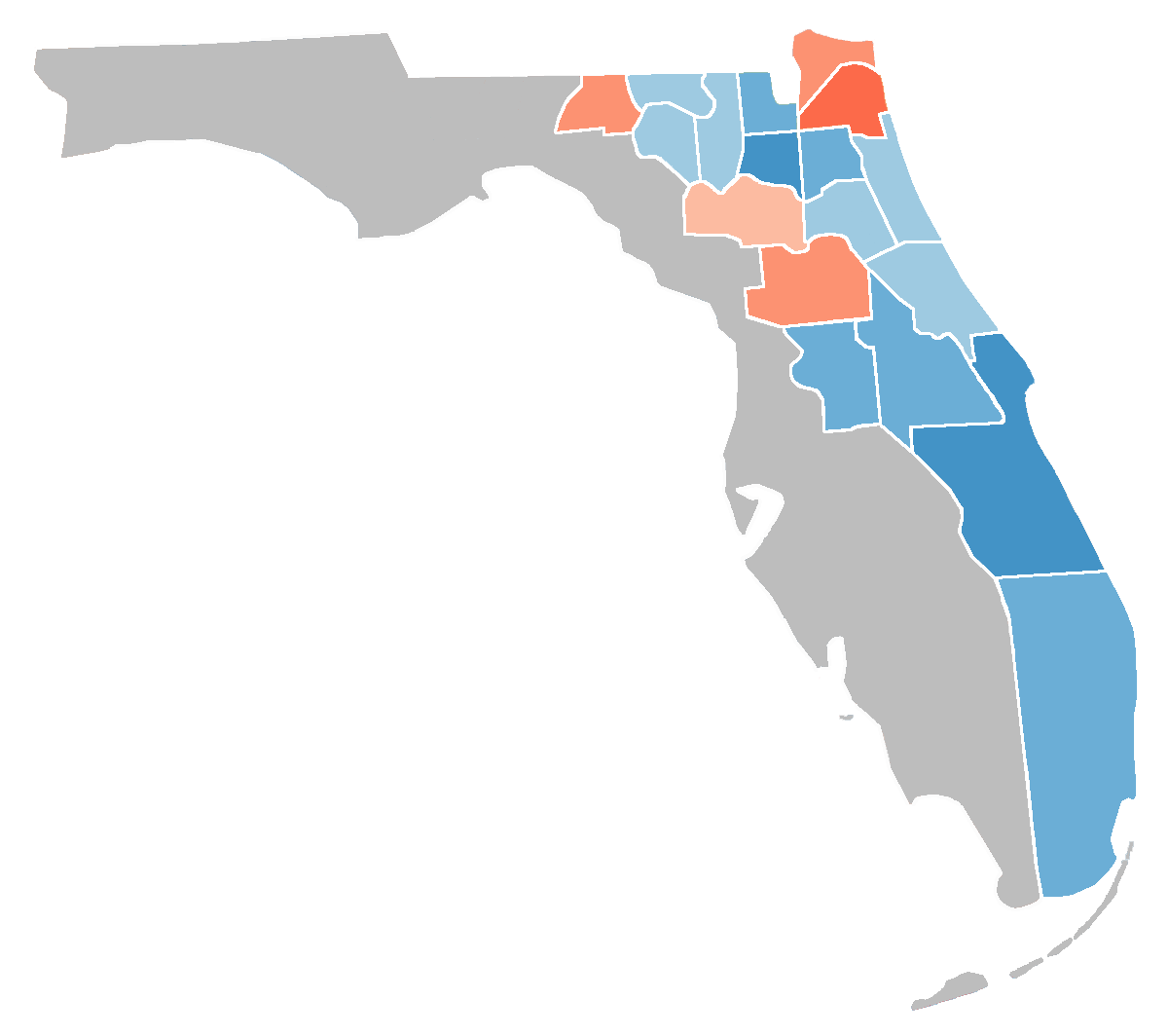
County Results
Dougherty
50–59%
60–69%
70–79%
Bisbee
40–49%
50–59%
60–69%

1884 United States House election 2nd District results
Democratic			Republican			Independent Republican		
Charles Dougherty	17,248	51.76%	Horatio Bisbee, Jr.	15,857	47.59%	Josiah T. Walls	215	0.65%

=== Results ===
County	Charles Dougherty Democratic		Horatio Bisbee, Jr. Republican		Josiah T. Walls Independent Republican		Total votes
County	#	%	#	%	#	%	Total votes
Alachua	1,771	46.20%	1,913	49.91%	149	3.89%	3,833
Baker	345	67.38%	167	32.62%	0	0.00%	512
Bradford	976	76.07%	305	23.77%	2	0.16%	1,283
Brevard	305	74.03%	107	25.97%	0	0.00%	412
Clay	508	62.33%	306	37.55%	1	0.12%	815
Columbia	1,064	52.86%	949	47.14%	0	0.00%	2,013
Dade	41	62.12%	24	36.36%	1	1.52%	66
Duval	1,955	37.14%	3,292	62.54%	17	0.32%	5,264
Hamilton	671	55.32%	542	44.68%	0	0.00%	1,213
Madison	557	40.37%	614	52.43%	0	0.00%	1,171
Marion	1,510	43.14%	1,985	56.71%	5	0.14%	3,500
Nassau	776	46.69%	872	52.47%	14	0.84%	1,662
Orange	1,880	63.02%	1,079	36.17%	24	0.80%	2,983
Putnam	1,134	50.09%	1,128	49.82%	2	0.09%	2,264
St. Johns	730	58.97%	508	41.03%	0	0.00%	1,238
Sumter	1,135	68.62%	519	31.38%	0	0.00%	1,654
Suwannee	974	55.78%	772	44.22%	0	0.00%	1,746
Volusia	916	54.17%	775	45.83%	0	0.00%	1,691
Totals	17,248	51.76%	15,857	47.59%	215	0.65%	33,320

== See also ==
- United States House of Representatives elections, 1886
