= William A. Cocke =

American attorney and politician

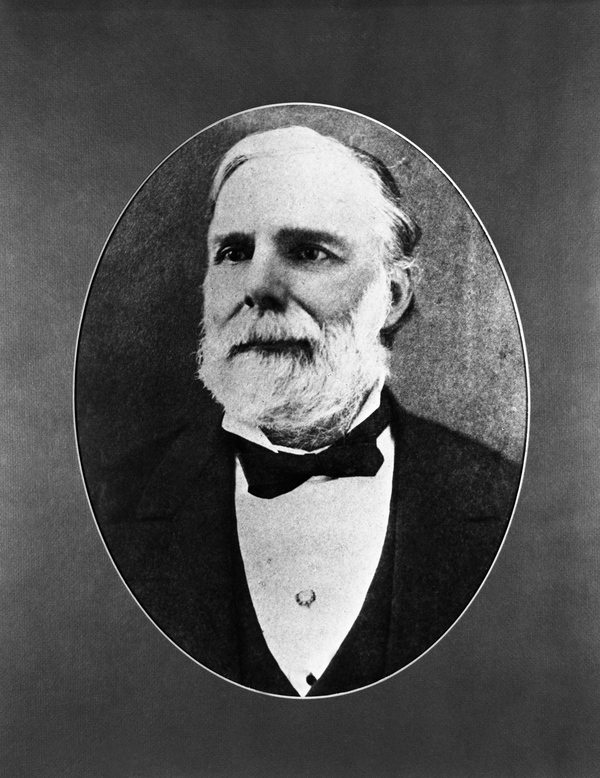

Judge of the Seventh Judicial Circuit Court of Florida
- In office January 3, 1877 – 1885
- Appointed by: George Franklin Drew

13th Florida Attorney General
- In office January 16, 1873 – January 3, 1877
- Governor: Ossian B. Hart; Marcellus Stearns
- Preceded by: J. P. C. Emmons
- Succeeded by: George P. Raney

Personal details
- Born: 1822 Powhatan County, Virginia, U.S.
- Died: October 17, 1887 (aged 64–65) Sanford, Florida, U.S.
- Party: Whig (until 1852); Democratic (after 1852)
- Spouse: Catherine Parkhill (m. 1852)
- Education: College of William and Mary
- Occupation: Attorney

William Archer Cocke (1822 – October 17, 1887) was an American attorney and politician who served as the 13th Florida Attorney General. Cocke was placed into the national spotlight due to his role in the controversy following the 1876 presidential election.

== Early life and education ==
Cocke was born in 1822 in Powhatan County, Virginia. He was a member of the Cocke family, a powerful Virginian political family. Cocke attended the College of William and Mary, graduating in 1843. He was admitted into the Virginia Bar in the same year, and began a private practice in Richmond, Virginia. Cocke married Catherine Parkhill in 1852 and moved to her home in Leon County, Florida.

== Political career ==
In 1852, following the collapse of the national Whig Party due to the disastrous 1852 presidential election, Cocke, like many other Southern Whigs, fled to the Democratic Party.

Cocke continued his private practice in Florida until the beginning of the American Civil War, when he accepted a high-profile position in the Confederate States Department of the Treasury in Richmond. Due to ailing health, Cocke returned to Florida in 1865, settling in Monticello. While in Monticello, Cocke continued his law practice and started the town's first newspaper.

In 1868, Republican governor Harrison Reed appointed Cocke as a judge to the First Judicial Circuit. He served in this position until January 16, 1873, when newly elected Republican governor Ossian B. Hart appointed him to be the Florida Attorney General, mostly as a result of Cocke's support of Hart and Republican president Ulysses S. Grant during the 1872 election. His aspirations often led to conflict with his Republican counterparts, though he continued to serve under Hart and his Republican successor Governor Marcellus Stearns.

=== 1876 United States presidential election ===
Grant chose not to seek a third term as president and the 1876 presidential election would decide his successor. The Republicans chose Ohio governor Rutherford B. Hayes and the Democrats chose New York governor Samuel J. Tilden as their candidates at their respective conventions. Though Tilden clearly beat Hayes in the popular vote, the electoral vote was extremely close. After a first count of votes, Tilden won 184 electoral votes to Hayes' 165, with 20 votes from four states unresolved, with a candidate needing 185 in order to win. The remaining four states – Florida, Louisiana, South Carolina, and Oregon – made up the remaining 20 electoral votes.

Due to the impending constitutional crisis, Congress set up the bipartisan Electoral Commission and the three Southern states set up their own returning boards. The Florida board, named the Florida Board of State Canvassers, was set up by Stearns in late 1876. Stearns appointed three members to the board: Republican Secretary of State Samuel B. McLin, Republican Comptroller Dr. Clayton A. Cowgill, and Cocke as the sole Democrat.

Despite the protest of Cocke, the Republican board members threw out 2,000 votes, and declared Hayes the winner by a margin of 924 votes. More importantly, however, they declared Stearns the winner of the tight gubernatorial election, versus Democratic challenger businessman George Franklin Drew, a Northern Democrat. However, on December 14, 1876, the Florida Supreme Court, though consisting of several Republicans, filed a writ of mandamus with the returning board as a result of the obvious corruption in the counting of votes, particularly in Manatee County, where votes were so fraudulent the proper result could not be determined. It was determined that the writ applied to only McLin and Cowgill, as Cocke used proper discretion and was exceedingly nonpartisan.

Initially, McLin and Cowgill intended to violate the court order, believing that the Federal Republican courts would save them. In South Carolina, the same situation occurred; however, when the returning board members in South Carolina were arrested, the federal courts did not come to their aid. Though initially McLin and Cowgill were going to obey the court order, Stearns appealed to national Republicans for aid, figuring that a loss for statewide Republicans would reflect on the presidential election. Republican National Committee Chairman Zachariah Chandler of Michigan, Indiana Senator Oliver P. Morton, and Ohio Senator John Sherman decided to intervene on Stearns' behalf.

With the backing of the national Republicans, Stearns ordered McLin, Cowgill, and Cocke to disobey the court orders at all costs. Eventually the Republicans and Democrats came to a compromise, with Drew being declared winner of the gubernatorial election and Hayes declared the recipient of Florida's 4 electoral votes, despite Cocke's protests against the latter. This smaller compromise, along with the compromises for the other three states, form the Compromise of 1877, which resulted in Hayes receiving the remaining 20 electoral votes, thereby winning the presidency, in exchange for the end of Reconstruction.

Due to Cocke's support for him and Tilden while on the returning board, Drew appointed Cocke to the Seventh Judicial Circuit in 1877, a position he would hold until his retirement in 1885.

== Death ==
Cocke died at his home in Sanford, Florida on October 17, 1887.
