= Killis B. Bonner =

American politician

Member of the Florida House of Representatives
- In office 1877

Personal details
- Born: c. 1847 North Carolina, U.S.
- Occupation: Politician, farmer

Killis B. Bonner (c. 1847 - ?) was an American farmer and state legislator in Florida. He represented Marion County, Florida in the Florida House of Representatives in 1877.

He was born in North Carolina.

He was elected in 1876. Some House documents use his initials and identify him as K. B. Bonner. He lost the 1878 election for a Florida House seat to Robert Bullock.

In 1881 he gave sworn testimony that Moses Foster Jr. was his brother-in-law and had been prohibited from voting. The testimony was for Horatio Bisbee Jr. in his contested election against Jesse J. Finley.

== See also ==
- Reconstruction era
- African American officeholders from the end of the Civil War until before 1900
