= Clayton Cowgill =

American politician

Clayton Augustus Cowgill (c. 1829 – February 2, 1901) was an American surgeon who served as Florida Comptroller from January 15, 1873 to January 12, 1877. Florida's governor appointed him to the Board of Canvassers to resolve the disputed November 1876 election. He was a Republican who served in Republican governor Ossian B. Hart's cabinet.

Cowgill was a surgeon from Dover, Delaware, and The Morning News noted that he was "possessed of superior mental faculties, highly cultivated, he applied himself assiduously to the study of his profession and his remarkable skill in the treatment of diseases, his devotion to his patients and agreeable personality, was rewarded by a large and lucrative practice." He also spent one year, 1853, as a clerk for the Delaware House of Representatives, having "remarkable alertness and ability" in the role. He served as a surgeon for the Union Army in New Bern, North Carolina, during the American Civil War. He moved to Florida at the end of the war.

Appointed to the three member Board of Canvassers determining disputed election results from November 1876, he and fellow Republican Samuel B. McLin determined Republican victories for president and governor. The Florida Supreme Court heard a case on the election. Republican Rutherford B. Hayes took office as president while Democrat George Franklin Drew became governor in Florida.

The Florida Archives have a bond on which the governor and cabinet members signatures appear.

Cowgill died on February 2, 1901, in West Philadelphia, Pennsylvania, at the age of 72.
