= J. P. C. Emmons =

American attorney and politician

12th Florida Attorney General
- In office 1872 – January 16, 1873
- Governor: Harrison Reed
- Preceded by: Horatio Bisbee Jr.
- Succeeded by: William A. Cocke

Prosecuting Attorney for Wayne County
- In office 1855–1857
- Governor: Kinsley S. Bingham

Member of the Wayne County School Board
- In office 1853–1854

Member of the Michigan House of Representatives from the Wayne district
- In office January 3, 1848 – 1848

3rd Clerk of the Michigan House of Representatives
- In office 1838–1838
- Governor: Stevens T. Mason
- Preceded by: Anthony Ten Eyck
- Succeeded by: Elijah J. Roberts

Personal details
- Born: January 1, 1818 Hudson Falls, New York, US
- Died: April 15, 1877 (aged 59) Jacksonville, Florida, US
- Party: Democratic (before 1854); Republican (after 1854)
- Spouse: Martha Eason Davisson
- Occupation: Attorney

Military service
- Allegiance: United States
- Branch/service: United States Army
- Years of service: 1861–1865
- Rank: Captain
- Unit: 1st Michigan Volunteer Cavalry Regiment
- Battles/wars: American Civil War

Jedediah Philo Clark Emmons (January 1, 1818 – April 15, 1877), more commonly referred to as Jed P. C. Emmons or J. P. C. Emmons, was an American attorney, judge, and politician who served as the 12th Florida Attorney General. He also served in the Michigan House of Representatives, as a judge in Michigan, and as a prosecuting attorney before serving in the Union Army. He settled in Jacksonville, Florida and was appointed by thr governor as Attorney General. He was the last Republican to serve for more than 100 years.

== Early life and education ==
Emmons was born on January 1, 1818, in Hudson Falls, New York. Emmons moved to Detroit, Michigan with his father and brother in 1836; his father, Adonijah, was an attorney, and his brother, Halmor Hull, would later become a federal judge. Upon arrival, Emmons became the private secretary for Michigan Governor Stevens T. Mason, and much of his early legal education came from Mason.

In 1838, Mason appointed Emmons as the Clerk of the Michigan House of Representatives, though he would only stay in that position for a year in order to continue his legal studies. Emmons was admitted into the Michigan Bar in 1840 and began a law practice in Detroit with his father and brother the same year, named A. Emmons & Sons.

== Political career ==
In 1848, Emmons, a Democrat, was elected to the Michigan House of Representatives, representing Wayne County. Although he served on the powerful State Affairs and Ways and Means committees, Emmons resigned within the year, opting to return to private practice.

In 1851, Emmons was appointed to be the commissioner of the circuit court of Marquette County, Michigan, by Governor John S. Barry. In 1853, he was elected to the Wayne County School Board, though he would resign the following year. In 1855, Governor Kinsley S. Bingham appointed Emmons as the Prosecuting Attorney for Wayne County. He held this position until 1857.

In 1854, Emmons joined the newly created Republican Party.

With the outbreak of the American Civil War in 1861, Emmons enlisted in the Union Army, serving in Company K of the 1st Michigan Cavalry. Emmons, who began as a private and rose all the way to captain, was also part of the Michigan Brigade, which was under the command of Brigadier General George Armstrong Custer. This brigade, a collection of various Michigan cavalry regiments, fought in every major campaign of the war from the Battle of Gettysburg in July 1863 to the Battle of Appomattox Courthouse in April 1865.

After the war, Emmons settled in Jacksonville, Florida. In 1872, Florida Governor Harrison Reed, another "carpetbagger" Republican from the Midwest, appointed Emmons as Florida Attorney General following the resignation of Horatio Bisbee Jr. Emmons served in this position until January 1873, when Judge William A. Cocke was officially elected to be Bisbee's successor.

== Personal life and death ==
Emmons was married to Martha Eason Davisson, a native Illinoisan.

Emmons died at his home in Jacksonville on April 15, 1877.

== See also ==
- List of American politicians who switched parties in office
