= J. B. C. Drew =

American lawyer and politician

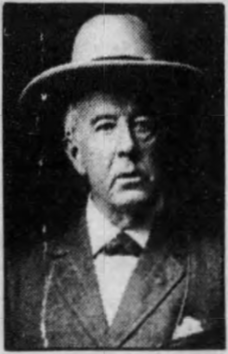

United States Attorney for the Northern District of Florida
- In office 1874–1876
- Appointed by: Ulysses S. Grant
- Preceded by: Horatio Bisbee, Jr
- Succeeded by: John B. Stickney

10th Florida Attorney General
- In office 1871 – May 4, 1872
- Governor: Harrison Reed
- Preceded by: Sherman Conant
- Succeeded by: Horatio Bisbee Jr.

Personal details
- Born: July 26, 1843 Newmarket, New Hampshire, US
- Died: November 4, 1924 (aged 81) Jacksonville, Florida, US
- Party: Republican (until 1872; after 1873); Liberal Republican (1872)
- Spouse(s): Winifred Ellis (div. 1871) Sarah Jane Salter (died 1886) Ella A.

Military service
- Allegiance: United States of America
- Branch/service: United States Army
- Years of service: 1864–1865
- Rank: First lieutenant
- Unit: 35th Wisconsin Volunteer Infantry Regiment
- Battles/wars: American Civil War: Battle of Spanish Fort; Battle of Fort Blakeley

James Brackett Creighton Drew (July 26, 1843 – November 4, 1924), also referred to as J. B. C. Drew, was an American lawyer and politician who served as the 10th Florida Attorney General.

== Early life and military service ==
Drew was born in Newmarket, New Hampshire, in 1843. At some point before the American Civil War, Drew moved to Madison, Wisconsin.

On January 24, 1864, Drew was commissioned as a second lieutenant for Company F of the newly created 35th Wisconsin, fighting with them at the Battle of Spanish Fort and the Battle of Fort Blakeley during the Mobile Campaign. On January 14, 1865, Drew was promoted to the rank of first lieutenant. He was mustered out of service on May 17, 1865.

After the war, Drew moved to Oshkosh, Wisconsin, and became a local lawyer.

== Political career ==
In 1871, Drew, via the favor of powerful friends, was appointed by Harrison Reed, the Governor of Florida, as the Florida Attorney General, succeeding Sherman Conant, who had been appointed a United States Marshal. Drew, a Republican, abandoned his first wife, Winifred, in Oshkosh and moved to Jacksonville, Florida, in order to take office.

By February 1872, Reed was proving to be an unpopular governor among both Democrats and Republicans, and he refused to extend Drew's tenure as Florida Attorney General. During Reed's second impeachment trial in the Florida Senate, Samuel T. Day, the Lieutenant Governor of Florida, attempted to oust Reed from power by declaring himself acting governor. Day's conspiracy was joined by Drew and two state senators.

In May 1872, Drew joined the newly founded Liberal Republican Party in defiance of Reed, and was one of Florida's delegates to the 1872 Liberal Republican convention, serving on the Committee on Credentials and the Committee on Platform. However, on May 4, 1872, while Drew was preoccupied at the convention, the Florida Senate ruled that Day's coup was unconstitutional and reappointed Reed as governor. Drew was removed from office that day, and was replaced by Horatio Bisbee, Jr., who was the United States Attorney for the Northern District of Florida. Drew, knowing his political reputation in Florida was tarnished, left the state altogether and became a lawyer in Washington, D.C.

After the 1872 election and the collapse of the Liberal Republican Party, he rejoined the Republican Party.

Despite his opposition to President Ulysses S. Grant during the 1872 election, Grant, likely with the urging of Drew's congressional allies, nominated him as the United States Attorney for the Northern District of Florida in 1873 following Bisbee's resignation. Though voting on his appointment was delayed in Congress by the Radical Republicans due to his former membership of the Liberal Republican Party and his betrayal of Reed, Drew was eventually confirmed by the United States Senate in 1874.

== Later career and retirement ==
After leaving his position as United States Attorney around 1880, Drew permanently settled in Washington, D.C., and opened a private law firm in the city.

Drew worked as a broker for several railroads in West Virginia. In December 1894, Drew helped the Chesapeake and Ohio Railway purchase 54,000 acres (84.375 square miles) of land near Horse Creek, West Virginia, which allowed for the connection of the railroad to the Kanawha River.

Drew retired by 1900 and moved to Europe, though he fled back to America following the outbreak of World War I. Drew first lived in Philadelphia, Pennsylvania, before moving to the Ravenswood Mansion in St. Albans, West Virginia. Drew also owned the Cummer House in Jacksonville, Florida, and often spent winters there.

== Personal life and death ==
Drew fell ill two weeks after arriving in Jacksonville, Florida, and died at his vacation home on November 4, 1924. He is buried in Jacksonville's Evergreen Cemetery and is interred with his third wife.

Drew was married three times. His first marriage was to Winifred Ellis (1848–1901) from Wisconsin in the 1860s, until he abandoned her in 1871 in order to move to Florida. After moving to Washington, D.C., Drew married Sarah Jane Salter (1843–1886), until her death in 1886. He was married a final time to Ella A. (1857), until his death.
