= Joseph E. Lee =

American politician (1849–1920)

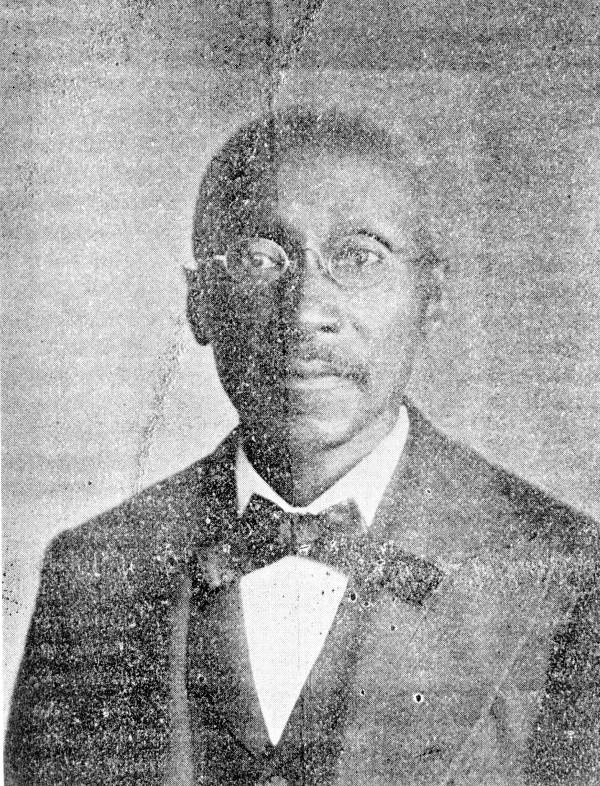

Member of the Florida Senate
- In office 1881–1882

Member of the Florida House of Representatives
- In office 1875–1880

Personal details
- Born: September 15, 1849 Philadelphia, Pennsylvania, U.S.
- Died: March 25, 1920 (aged 70)
- Party: Republican
- Spouse: Rosa
- Education: Howard University

Joseph E. Lee (September 15, 1849 – March 25, 1920) was a lawyer, judge, federal official, and Republican politician in Florida. He served six years in the Florida House of Representatives and one term in the Florida State Senate and was also a municipal judge and in various Federal positions in Florida.

Lee was born in Philadelphia. He earned his law degree from Howard University in 1873.

He was a minister in the A.M.E. Church and married a woman named Rosa.

The Jacksonville Historical Society has a collection of his papers. In April 2020, a talk was scheduled at the Jacksonville Historical Society on Lee.

== See also ==
- African American officeholders from the end of the Civil War until before 1900
