= Noble A. Hull =

American politician

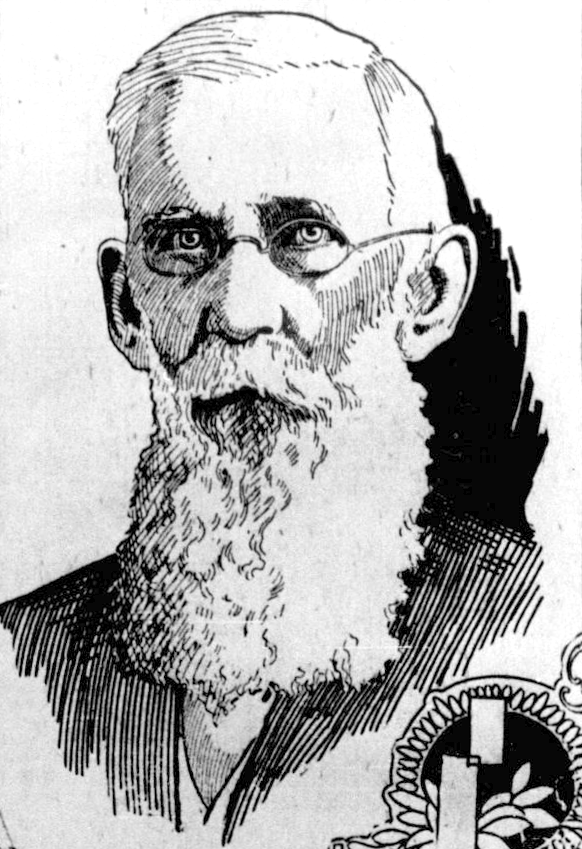

Member of the U.S. House of Representatives from Florida's 2nd district
- In office March 4, 1879 – January 22, 1881
- Preceded by: Jesse J. Finley
- Succeeded by: Horatio Bisbee, Jr.

6th Lieutenant Governor of Florida
- In office January 2, 1877 – March 3, 1879
- Governor: George Franklin Drew
- Preceded by: Marcellus Stearns
- Succeeded by: Livingston W. Bethel

Member of the Florida House of Representatives
- In office 1860–1861

Personal details
- Born: March 11, 1827 Camden County, Georgia, U.S.
- Died: January 28, 1907 (aged 79) Jacksonville, Florida, U.S.
- Party: Democratic
- Spouse: Eleanor C. Sturtevant

Noble Andrew Hull (March 11, 1827 – January 28, 1907) was a U.S. representative from Florida and the sixth lieutenant governor of Florida.

== Early life ==
Born in Little York, Georgia, and raised on a plantation, Hull attended the county schools and Chatham Academy in Savannah, Georgia. He engaged in mercantile pursuits in Savannah in 1845. In 1851, he moved to Florida and continued his business in Columbia County. When Suwannee County was formed out of part of Columbia County in 1858, was elected the new county's first sheriff.

== The Civil War ==
Hull represented Columbia County in the Florida House of Representatives in 1860 and 1861 and was present at the convention in which Florida seceded from the Union. During the Civil War, he served as captain of Company H, First Florida Cavalry, in the Confederate States Army. After the war, he settled in Jacksonville, where his home remained except for a three-year period he spent in Sanford.

== Lieutenant Governor and Congressman ==
Hull was sworn in as Florida's sixth lieutenant governor along with Governor George F. Drew on January 2, 1877. He was elected to the U.S. House of Representatives in 1878, and the following year, he resigned as Lieutenant Governor. Hull took his seat in the 46th Congress on March 4, 1879. However, his opponent, Horatio Bisbee, Jr., contested the election and succeeded him on January 22, 1881.

== Later life ==
After his term in Congress, Hull served as assistant postmaster of Jacksonville from 1884 to 1888 and clerk of Duval County circuit court from 1888 to 1900.

Hull married Eleanor C. Sturdivant on January 24, 1860. They had one daughter before his wife died on January 27, 1902. Hull died in Jacksonville on January 28, 1907, and was interred in Evergreen Cemetery.

Political offices
Preceded by Marcellus Stearns	Lieutenant Governor of Florida; 1877–1879	Succeeded by Livingston W. Bethel
U.S. House of Representatives
Preceded by Jesse J. Finley	Member of the U.S. House of Representatives from Florida's 2nd congressional district March 4, 1879 – January 22, 1881	Succeeded by Horatio Bisbee, Jr.
