= Florida Attorney General =

Chief legal officer of Florida

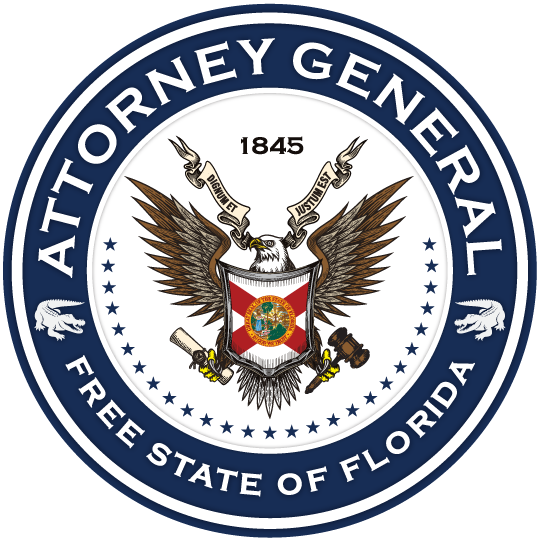
- Seal of the attorney general of Florida

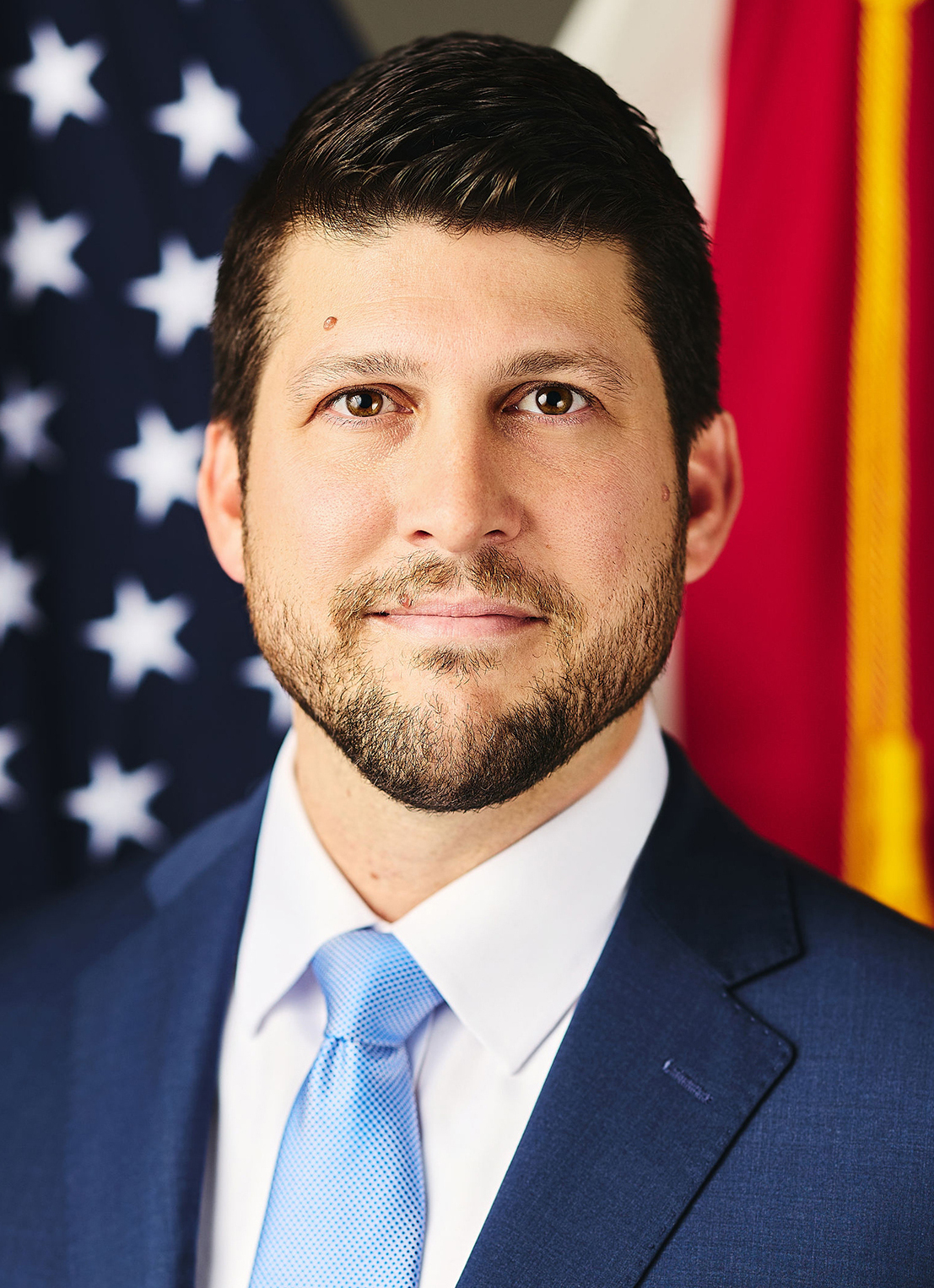
- Incumbent; James Uthmeier since February 17, 2025
- Department of Legal Affairs
- Style: The Honorable
- Member of: Florida Cabinet
- Seat: Tallahassee, Florida
- Appointer: Popular vote
- Term length: Four years, renewable once
- Constituting instrument: Constitution of Florida
- Inaugural holder: Joseph Branch
- Formation: 1845
- Succession: Second
- Website: Official website

The Florida attorney general is the chief legal officer of the U.S. state of Florida. The officeholder is a member of the Florida Cabinet and the head of the state Department of Legal Affairs. The office is one of Florida's three elected state cabinet posts, along with the chief financial officer and agriculture commissioner.

James Uthmeier has been the 30th and current attorney general since 2025, having been appointed by Governor Ron DeSantis to replace Ashley Moody, who resigned to become a United States senator.

== Qualifications and term of office ==
Article IV, Section 4, of the Constitution of Florida establishes the cabinet and the position of attorney general. As with other elected statewide offices in Florida, the attorney general is limited to serving two consecutive four-year terms. The attorney general must meet the following qualifications to be eligible for the office:

- A registered elector;
- Not be less than 30 years old;
- Have resided in the state for the preceding 7 years; and
- Have been a member of the Florida Bar for 5 years.

The attorney general is second (behind the lieutenant governor) in the line of succession to the office of Governor of Florida.

=== Removal from office ===
The Florida attorney general can be impeached for committing a "misdemeanor in office" by the State House of Representatives, and then convicted and thereby removed from office by a two-thirds vote of the State Senate.

== Powers and duties ==
Title IV, Chapter 16 of the Florida statutes establish the general duties of the office. The general duties of the attorney general are as follows:

- Issue official opinions on any question of law when requested in writing by a state officers or legislator;
- Appear on behalf of the state in any civil suit or criminal prosecution, and in the Supreme Court of Florida and its appellate courts;
- Act as co-counsel of record in capital collateral proceedings;
- Other duties incident or usual to the office; and
- Request the opinion of the justices of the supreme court as to the validity of any initiative petition circulated pursuant to Section 3 of Article XI of the Florida constitution.

The Solicitor General of Florida is appointed by and serves at the pleasure of the attorney general. The current solicitor is Henry C. Whitaker.

== List of Florida attorneys general ==
Attorneys general by party affiliation
| Party | Attorneys general |
|---|---|
| Democratic | 27 |
| Republican | 11 |
| Whig | 1 |

| # | Image | Name | Term of service | Political party |
|---|---|---|---|---|
| 1 | | Joseph Branch | 1845–1846 | Democratic |
| 2 | | Augustus Maxwell | 1846–1848 | Democratic |
| 3 | | James T. Archer | 1848 | Democratic |
| 4 | | David P. Hogue | 1848–1853 | Whig |
| 5 | | Mariano D. Papy | 1853–1861 | Democratic |
| 6 | | John B. Galbraith | 1861–1868 | Democratic |
| 7 | | James Westcott III | 1868 | Democratic |
| 8 | | A. R. Meek | 1868–1870 | Republican |
| 9 | | Sherman Conant | 1870–1871 | Republican |
| 10 | | J. B. C. Drew | 1871–1872 | Republican |
| 11 | | Horatio Bisbee Jr. | 1872 | Republican |
| 12 | | J. P. C. Emmons | 1872–1873 | Republican |
| 13 | | William A. Cocke | 1873–1877 | Democratic |
| 14 | | George P. Raney | 1877–1885 | Democratic |
| 15 | | Charles Merian Cooper | 1885–1889 | Democratic |
| 16 | | William Bailey Lamar | 1889–1903 | Democratic |
| 17 | | James B. Whitfield | 1903–1904 | Democratic |
| 18 | | W. H. Ellis | 1904–1909 | Democratic |
| 19 | | Park Trammell | 1909–1913 | Democratic |
| 20 | | Thomas F. West | 1913–1917 | Democratic |
| 21 | | Van C. Swearingen | 1917–1921 | Democratic |
| 22 | | Rivers Buford | 1921–1925 | Democratic |
| 23 | | J. B. Johnson | 1925–1927 | Democratic |
| 24 | | Fred Henry Davis | 1927–1931 | Democratic |
| 25 | | Cary D. Landis | 1931–1938 | Democratic |
| 26 | | George Couper Gibbs | 1938–1941 | Democratic |
| 27 | | J. Thomas Watson | 1941–1949 | Democratic |
| 28 | | Richard Ervin | 1949–1964 | Democratic |
| 29 | | James W. Kynes | 1964–1965 | Democratic |
| 30 | | Earl Faircloth | 1965–1971 | Democratic |
| 31 | | Robert Shevin | 1971–1979 | Democratic |
| 32 | | James C. Smith | 1979–1987 | Democratic |
| 33 | | Bob Butterworth | 1987–2002 | Democratic |
| 34 | | Richard E. Doran | 2002–2003 | Republican |
| 35 | | Charlie Crist | 2003–2007 | Republican |
| 36 | | Bill McCollum | 2007–2011 | Republican |
| 37 | | Pam Bondi | 2011–2019 | Republican |
| 38 | | Ashley Moody | 2019–2025 | Republican |
| -- | | John M. Guard; Acting | 2025 | Republican |
| 39 | | James Uthmeier | 2025–present | Republican |

== See also ==
- Constitution of Florida
- Florida Cabinet
- Florida Democratic Party
- Republican Party of Florida
