= Jesse J. Finley =

American politician (1812–1904)

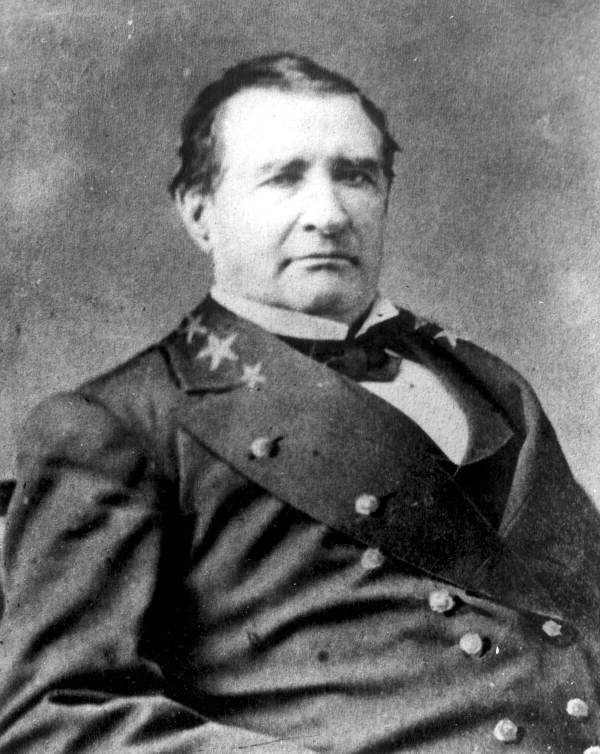

Member of the U.S. House of Representatives from Florida's 2nd district
- In office March 4, 1881 – June 1, 1882
- Preceded by: Horatio Bisbee Jr.
- Succeeded by: Horatio Bisbee Jr.
- In office February 20, 1879 – March 3, 1879
- Preceded by: Horatio Bisbee, Jr.
- Succeeded by: Noble A. Hull
- In office April 19, 1876 – March 3, 1877
- Preceded by: Josiah T. Walls
- Succeeded by: Horatio Bisbee, Jr.

Personal details
- Born: Jesse Johnson Finley; November 18, 1812 Lebanon, Tennessee, U.S.
- Died: November 6, 1904 (aged 91) Lake City, Florida, U.S.
- Resting place: Evergreen Cemetery, Gainesville, Florida, U.S.
- Party: Democratic

Military service
- Allegiance: Confederate States of America
- Branch/service: Confederate States Army
- Years of service: 1862-1865
- Rank: Brigadier General
- Commands: Florida Brigade, AoT
- Battles/wars: American Civil War: Kentucky Campaign; Battle of Chickamauga; Battle of Missionary Ridge; Battle of Resaca; Battle of Jonesborough

Jesse Johnson Finley (November 18, 1812 – November 6, 1904) was an American politician and military officer who was a brigadier general in the Confederate States Army during the American Civil War and a Democratic member of the United States House of Representatives from Florida after the Reconstruction era. He also served as mayor of Memphis, Tennessee; a volunteer officer in the United States Army during the Second Seminole War; a member of the Arkansas Senate; a member of the Florida Senate; and a circuit court judge in Florida.

== Early life (1812 to 1852) ==
Finley was born near Lebanon, Tennessee. He served as captain of mounted volunteers in the Second Seminole War in 1836. Finley studied law and was admitted to the bar in 1838. He moved to Mississippi County, Arkansas, in 1840, where he practiced law. Finley served in the Arkansas Senate in 1841. He moved to Memphis, Tennessee, in 1842, and continued the practice of law. He served as mayor of Memphis in 1845. He moved to Marianna, Florida, in November 1846 and was elected to the Florida Senate in 1850.

Finley was a presidential elector on the Whig Party ticket in 1852.

== Judicial Service to the State of Florida (1853 to 1861) ==
On May 1, 1853, Florida Governor Thomas Brown appointed Finley Circuit Judge of the Western Judicial Circuit of Florida. Finley served as a Circuit Judge of the Western Judicial Circuit of Florida from 1853 to 1861.

=== State of Florida v. Simon, A Slave ===
In June 1853, Finley presided over State of Florida v. Simon, A Slave. The case involved an arson and a confession under duress.

The Collins Hotel in Pensacola, Florida burned on October 17, 1852; the Collins fire spread to the home of Francisco Moreno. On October 18, Dr. R.T. Maxwell's home burned, and an alleged arson attempt was made to the home of a Mrs. Derry, from which a perpetrator was discovered and fled. On October 19, Alex McVoy's home burned. After the McVoy fire, Pensacola Mayor Joseph Sierra ordered the arrest of Simon, one of McVoy's slaves, for arson. Sierra questioned Simon in the Mayor's office; took Simon's confession to arson of the Maxwell, Derry, and McVoy homes; and ordered Simon arrested. Simon was held in the Pensacola jail from October 1852 until trial in June 1853.

Sierra testified at the June trial that during Simon's interrogation "there was a great crowd just outside the mayor’s office calling for Simon to be hanged. According to Mayor Sierra, if not for the protection he gave Simon, 'the people would have taken [Simon] into their own hands.' The mayor told Simon that if he admitted that he alone had burned Dr. Maxwell’s house, that he would be tried and certainly hung. However, the mayor also told Simon that if he had accomplices, he could turn state’s evidence and his accomplices would be put on trial rather than him." Sierra further testified that when he asked Simon if he set these fires, "Simon replied, 'Send for my master, and I will tell the whole.' Simon’s master, Alex McVoy, arrived at the mayor’s office, and McVoy reiterated to Simon the warnings and promises that the mayor had already made. Simon then stated that he had set fire to Dr. Maxwell’s house, and that he was alone when he did it. Simon told Mayor Sierra and McVoy that he had started the fire at a ground-floor window on the east side of Dr. Maxwell’s house and remained there until it was blazing."

Simon's attorney Richard Lewis Campbell questioned Mr. Joseph Commyns, who "testified that he saw Dr. Maxwell’s house on fire at about 2 a.m. and that he was one of the first persons to arrive on scene. Commyns contradicted Simon’s purported confession. According to Commyns, the fire did not start at the ground floor of the house as Simon had stated, but rather at the shingles on the roof." Campbell also questioned Chester Knapp, who "contradicted Simon’s purported confession. According to Knapp, the fire had not started on the ground floor, but rather in the attic. Further, Knapp testified that upon seeing the attic in flames, he had tried to break down the front door of the home, and that had the ground floor windows been burning, he would have noticed."

Following Campbell's examination of Commyns and Knapp, the State questioned McVoy, "who testified that he was in the mayor’s office when Simon confessed and that Simon was 'laboring under great terror, and that he never saw anyone more terrified.'" Citing American and English common law, Campbell motioned that Finley "exclude Simon’s confession from the jury’s consideration, arguing that Simon’s statements to Mayor Sierra were elicited by undue terror or the hope of reward." Finley denied Campbell's motion and directed the jury "to determine whether Simon’s confession was voluntary." The jury found Simon guilty. Simon stated at a sentencing hearing that he was not guilty of arson. Finley then ordered Simon executed by hanging on Friday, August 26, 1853, between 10 a.m. and 1 p.m. by the Sheriff of Escambia County at “some convenient place.”

Campbell appealed Finley's denial of Campbell's motion to the Supreme Court of Florida. The Court heard oral arguments on July 13 and 14, 1853. On July 25, 1853, with Finley present, the Court reversed Finley's denial of Campbell's motion in a 2 to 1 ruling, and ordered a new trial. The Court based their decision "on the common law doctrine that for a confession to be admissible as evidence, the mind of the accused should at the time of the confession be uninfluenced by fear or hope. With respect to Simon's confession, Justice [Albert G.] Semmes noted that there were 'few cases to be found in the books where stronger influences were brought to bear on the mind of the prisoner to extort a confession than the one before us. That it was made under the influence of fear or apprehension of personal violence, can scarce be doubted.' Justice Semmes noted that the crowd outside the mayor's office was clamoring to hang Simon, and Mayor Sierra, who was Simon's only protection from the crowd, was demanding that Simon confess. Justice Semmes reasoned that if Simon maintained his innocence, he risked alienating Mayor Sierra, which could have resulted in the mayor abandoning him to the crowd. Justice Semmes speculated that in Simon's mind, a confession was 'the only immediate security for his person and his life.' Justice Semmes also focused on the fact that Simon was a slave, and that Simon made his confession in the presence of, and at the urging of, his master. According to Justice Semmes, 'the ease with which this class of our population can be intimidated, and the almost absolute control which the owner does involuntarily exercise over the will of the slave, should induce the courts at all times to receive their confessions with the utmost caution and distrust.' Further, Justice Semmes opined that the trial testimony proved that Simon had falsely confessed. Specifically, Justice Semmes noted that when Simon admitted to the burning of Dr. Maxwell's house, he claimed to have set the fire at the east window on the first floor of the home, and that he had stayed there watching the fire until it blazed up. However, the two defense witnesses who testified at trial stated that the fire had started at the top of the house in the attic. One of these witnesses testified that, as the attic burned, he was located near the ground floor east window where Simon had confessed to starting the fire, but there was no fire there. According to Justice Semmes, '[T]hese witnesses, who are unimpeached, and whose testimony is uncontradicted, establish the fact, that the confessions of the prisoner as to the particulars of the burning were altogether untrue.' As Justice Semmes reasoned, if Simon had been truthfully confessing to arson, he would have had no reason to lie about the location where he had started the fire."

Hardy stated that "without [Simon's] coerced confession, it did not appear there was any evidence to convict him." Simon was to be held in the Pensacola jail until the second trial. Finley cancelled the October 1853 Escambia County Circuit Court term due to a Yellow Fever epidemic. Simon's second trial was postponed until the next Escambia County Circuit Court term, in June 1854. Simon died in the Pensacola jail on February 25, 1854. The Florida Supreme Court's 1853 reversal of Finley's decision established a precedent that confessions extracted by threats or promises are inadmissible at trial.

=== End of Pre- Civil War Judicial Service to the State of Florida ===
With the outbreak of the Civil War in 1861, Finley left service to the Western Judicial Circuit of Florida.

== Service to the Confederate States of America (1861 to 1865) ==
=== Judicial Service ===
Finley was appointed judge of the Confederate States court for the district of Florida in 1861. He resigned in March 1862 to join the Confederate Army.

=== Military service ===
Finley volunteered as a private in the 6th Florida Infantry of the Confederate Army, and was successively promoted to be the colonel of the regiment. He took part in the Kentucky Campaign in Maj. Gen. Edmund Kirby Smith's column. His first significant combat came at the Battle of Chickamauga, where his regiment captured a battery of Union artillery, but was unsupported and forced to withdraw with 165 casualties.

He was promoted to brigadier general on November 8, 1863 (with date of rank of November 16), commanding all of the Florida infantry in the Army of Tennessee. HFinley's Brigade, part of Maj. Gen. John C. Breckinridge's division, was caught up in the Confederate rout at the Battle of Missionary Ridge, but performed well in protecting the rearguard of the army as it withdrew. Army commander Gen. Braxton Bragg expressed his thanks to Finley for "his gallant bearing and prompt assistance in every emergency." Finley's brigade saw heavy fighting in the Atlanta campaign of 1864. He was badly wounded at Battle of Resaca and placed on medical leave until the army reached Atlanta. At the Battle of Jonesborough, his horse was killed by artillery shell fragments, which severely wounded him again, but he refused to be evacuated to Atlanta until all of his wounded men had been taken care of. Finley was unable to return to his brigade for the remainder of the war. He tried to reach it in North Carolina after he recovered from a second wound, but Federal troops blocked his way.

=== Military Surrender ===
Finley surrendered with Maj. Gen. Howell Cobb in Columbus, Georgia, and was paroled to Quincy, Florida, on May 23, 1865.

== Congressional Service to the United States of America (1876 to 1882) ==
Finley successfully contested the election of Josiah T. Walls to the 44th United States Congress. Walls, a black Republican, was unseated after party-line vote of the congressional committee elected to throw out votes from a predominantly black district that favored Walls 568 to 11 for Finley. Finley served in the United States House of Representatives during the 44th, 45th, and 47th United States Congress as a member of the Democratic Party (United States). Finley served from April 19, 1876, to March 3, 1877. Finley successfully contested the election of Horatio Bisbee, Jr. to the 45th United States Congress and served from February 20 to March 3, 1879. He presented credentials as a Member-elect to the 47th United States Congress and served from March 4, 1881, to June 1, 1882, when he was succeeded by Horatio Bisbee, Jr., who successfully contested Finley's election.

Finley presented credentials on December 5, 1887, as a Senator-designate to the United States Senate for the term commencing March 4, 1887, but was not permitted to qualify because the appointment was made before the vacancy occurred.

=== Electoral history ===
1882 United States House of Representatives election in Florida Florida 2nd district
Party	Candidate	Votes	%	±%
Republican	Horatio Bisbee, Jr. (inc.)	13,069	50.50%	+2.80%
Democratic	Jesse J. Finley	12,813	49.50%	−2.80%
Majority		256	1.00%	−3.54%
Turnout		25,882		

1880 United States House of Representatives election in Florida Florida 2nd district (Note: Bisbee contested Finley's election and was seated in his place on June 1, 1882)
Party	Candidate	Votes	%	±%
Democratic	Jesse J. Finley	13,105	52.30%	+2.27%
Republican	Horatio Bisbee, Jr. (inc.)	11,953	47.70%	−2.27%
Majority		1,152	4.60%	+4.54%
Turnout		25,058		

1876 United States House of Representatives election in Florida Florida 2nd district (Note: Finley contested Bisbee's election and was seated in his place on February 20, 1879)
Party	Candidate	Votes	%	±%
Republican	Horatio Bisbee, Jr.	11,574	50.01%	−1.12%
Democratic	Jesse J. Finley (inc.)	11,571	49.99%	+1.12%
Majority		3	0.02%	−2.24%
Turnout		23,145		

== Personal life ==
Finley had a son, Charles A. Finley, who served as an administrator at Florida Agricultural College, and a daughter.

== Death (1904) ==
Finley died on November 6, 1904, in Lake City, Florida. He was interred to Evergreen Cemetery in Gainesville, Florida.

== Legacy ==
In the 1930s, the School Board of Alachua County (Florida) named an elementary school for Finley. JJ Finley Elementary School was located in Gainesville, Florida, at the corner of Northwest 5th Avenue and 19th Street, about 1 kilometer north of the University of Florida. On June 16, 2020, the School Board of Alachua County (Florida) removed J.J. Finley's name from the school, during protests associated with the murder of George Floyd. A citizen committee appointed by the Alachua County school board recommended renaming the school after African-American research physicist and Gainesville native Carolyn Parker, and the change was adopted in August 2020.

In January 2019, the Gainesville City Commission named a city park in honor of Finley. The vote to name the park for Finley was unanimous. In February 2020, the City of Gainesville City Commission removed Finley's name from the park, by a unanimous vote. The City process to approve a new name required input from a citizen advisory board. The City suspended advisory board activity during the COVID-19 pandemic in the United States. The park remained unnamed through the pandemic. The Gainesville Sun inaccurately reported that the playground was renamed "as part of the city of Gainesville and Alachua County's truth and reconciliation process".

== See also ==
- List of American Civil War generals (Confederate)

== Notes ==
U.S. House of Representatives
Preceded by Josiah T. Walls	Member of the U.S. House of Representatives from Florida's 2nd congressional district 1876 – 1877	Succeeded by Robert H. M. Davidson
Preceded by Horatio Bisbee Jr.	Member of the U.S. House of Representatives from Florida's 2nd congressional district 1879	Succeeded by Robert H. M. Davidson
Preceded by Horatio Bisbee Jr.	Member of the U.S. House of Representatives from Florida's 2nd congressional district 1881 – 1882	Succeeded by Horatio Bisbee Jr.
