= Charles Dougherty (Florida politician) =

American politician

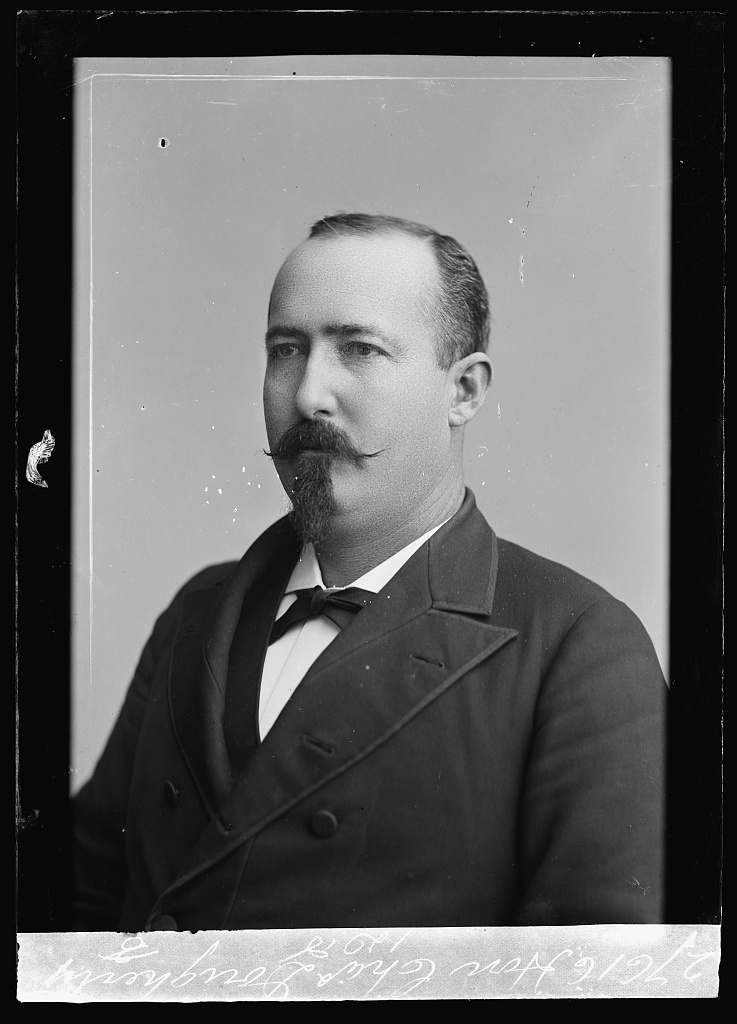

Charles Dougherty (October 15, 1850 – October 11, 1915) was an American politician who served in the Florida House of Representatives, the Florida Senate, and in the United States House of Representatives. A Democrat, he inherited a plantation from his father. He served as Speaker of the Florida House of Representatives.

He was born in Athens, Georgia, where he attended public and private schools. He also studied at the University of Virginia in Charlottesville. He moved to Florida in 1871, settled near Port Orange, and engaged in planting.

He served in the State house of representatives from 1877 until 1885, including as speaker in 1879. He was elected as a Democrat to United States House of Representatives for the Forty-ninth and Fiftieth Congresses (March 4, 1885 – March 3, 1889). He resumed agricultural pursuits before again becoming a member of the state house of representatives in 1891, 1892, 1911, and 1912. He served in the State senate from 1895 until 1898.

Dougherty died at Daytona Beach, Volusia County, Fla., on October 11, 1915; interment in Pinewood Cemetery.

U.S. House of Representatives
Preceded by Horatio Bisbee, Jr.	Member of the U.S. House of Representatives from Florida's 2nd congressional district 1885–1889	Succeeded by Robert Bullock
