= Marcellus Stearns =

11th Governor of Florida

Marcellus Lovejoy Stearns
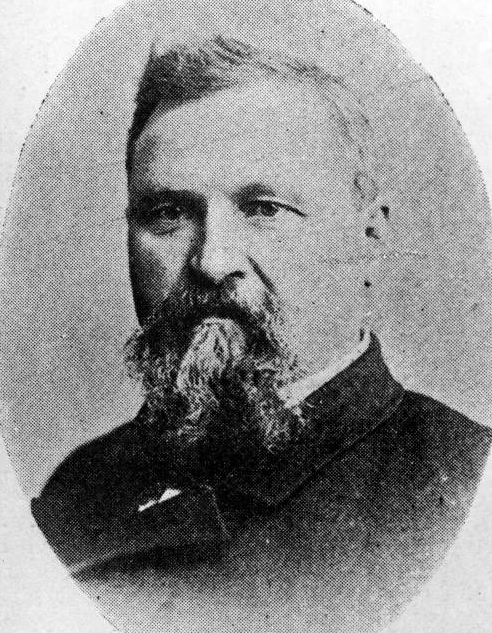

11th Governor of Florida
- In office March 18, 1874 – January 2, 1877
- Lieutenant: Vacant
- Preceded by: Ossian B. Hart
- Succeeded by: George Franklin Drew

5th Lieutenant Governor of Florida
- In office January 7, 1873 – March 18, 1874
- Governor: Ossian B. Hart
- Preceded by: Samuel T. Day
- Succeeded by: Noble A. Hull

Member of the Florida House of Representatives
- In office 1868–1872

Speaker of the Florida House of Representatives (1869)

Personal details
- Born: April 29, 1839 Lovell, Maine, US
- Died: December 8, 1891 (aged 52) Palatine Bridge, New York, US
- Resting place: Center Lovell, Maine
- Party: Republican
- Spouse: None
- Profession: Lawyer

Marcellus Lovejoy Stearns (April 29, 1839 – December 8, 1891) was an American politician who served as the 11th Governor of Florida from 1874 to 1877 during the Reconstruction Era. Originally from Maine, he also served in the Union Army during the American Civil War, losing an arm, and served in Florida's 1868 constitutional convention and in the Florida House of Representatives, including time as speaker.

Born in Lovell in Oxford County in southwestern Maine, he attended Waterville College in Waterville, Maine (which later became Colby College). In 1861, he joined the Union Army and lost an arm during the Battle of Opequon in Winchester, Virginia, after which the Army sent him to study law. He was assigned to Quincy in Gadsden County in the Florida Panhandle, where he remained after his discharge from the military.

Stearns was a member of the Florida Constitutional Convention of 1868 and the Florida House of Representatives from 1868 through 1872, of which he was the Speaker in 1869. He was elected the fifth Lieutenant Governor of Florida in 1872.

He succeeded to the governorship on March 18, 1874, at age 34 when Governor Ossian B. Hart died of pneumonia. He remains the state's youngest-serving governor. Stearns attempted to force Jonathan Clarkson Gibbs to resign his post as Superintendent of Public Instruction, but was unsuccessful due to Gibbs' immense popularity. After leaving office on January 2, 1877, he was appointed U. S. Commissioner in Hot Springs, Arkansas, a post that he held until 1880. He died in Palatine Bridge, New York, fifty miles from the capital city of Albany. He is interred in the village of Center Lovell, Maine.

After he left office on January 2, 1877, there was no Republican governor of Florida until 1967, when Claude Kirk was inaugurated.

As of 2026, Stearns remains the only governor of Florida who has never been married.

Party political offices
| Preceded by Ossian B. Hart | Republican nominee for Governor of Florida; 1876 | Succeeded by Simon B. Conover |
Political offices
| Preceded by Samuel T. Day | Lieutenant Governor of Florida; 1873–1874 | Succeeded by Noble A. Hull |
| Preceded by Ossian B. Hart | Governor of Florida; 1874–1877 | Succeeded by George F. Drew |
