= Horatio Bisbee Jr. =

American politician (1839–1916)

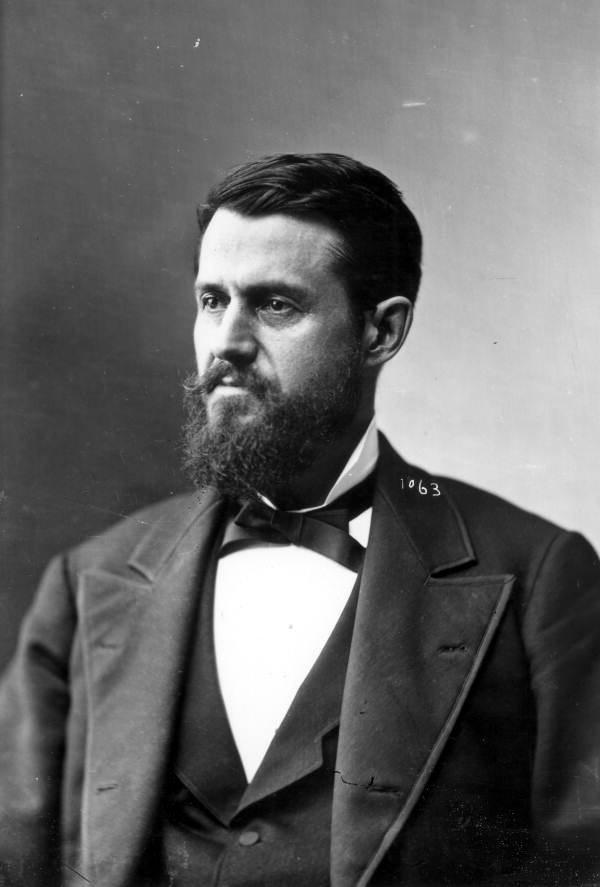

Member of the U.S. House of Representatives from Florida's 2nd district
- In office June 1, 1882 – March 3, 1885
- Preceded by: Jesse J. Finley
- Succeeded by: Charles Dougherty
- In office January 22, 1881 – March 3, 1881
- Preceded by: Noble A. Hull
- Succeeded by: Jesse J. Finley
- In office March 4, 1877 – February 20, 1879
- Preceded by: Jesse J. Finley
- Succeeded by: Jesse J. Finley

11th Florida Attorney General
- In office 1872–1872
- Governor: Harrison Reed
- Preceded by: J. B. C. Drew
- Succeeded by: J. P. C. Emmons

United States Attorney for the Northern District of Florida
- In office 1869–1873
- Appointed by: Ulysses S. Grant

Personal details
- Born: May 5, 1839 Canton, Maine, U.S.
- Died: March 27, 1916 (aged 76) Dixfield, Maine, U.S.
- Party: Republican
- Spouse: Charlotte Randolph
- Children: 1
- Education: Tufts College
- Occupation: Attorney

Military service
- Allegiance: United States
- Branch/service: United States Army
- Years of service: 1861–1863
- Rank: Colonel
- Unit: 5th Regiment Massachusetts Volunteer Militia
- Commands: 9th Maine Volunteer Infantry Regiment
- Battles/wars: American Civil War

Horatio Bisbee Jr. (May 1, 1839 – March 27, 1916) was an American attorney and politician who served as a U.S. representative from Florida.

== Early life and education ==
Bisbee was born on May 1, 1839, in Canton, Maine. Bisbee began attending Tufts College in Massachusetts, but halted his studies in 1861 when the American Civil War broke out.

Bisbee enlisted in the Union Army with the 5th Massachusetts Militia as a private until July 1861, when he was appointed as a captain in the 9th Maine Infantry. He eventually rose to the ranks of lieutenant colonel and later colonel. Bisbee retired from the army in March 1863 and returned to Tufts College, graduating later that year.

== Political career ==
Bisbee moved to Chicago, Illinois, in late 1863 and was admitted into the Illinois Bar in 1864. After the end of the war in 1865, Bisbee moved to Jacksonville, Florida, and established his law practice there. In 1869, President Ulysses S. Grant appointed Bisbee as the U.S. Attorney for the Northern District of Florida. In this position, Bisbee, a Republican, made acquaintance with several high-profile Floridians, including Governor Harrison Reed and lawyer Joseph E. Lee, who was one of the most prominent black Republicans in Florida at the time.

In 1872, Bisbee was temporarily appointed as the eleventh Florida Attorney General by Reed. He stepped down when lawyer J. P. C. Emmons was chosen to permanently fill the position. During his appointment, he was still serving as a U.S. Attorney. He resigned as U.S. Attorney in 1873.

=== U.S. House of Representatives ===
In 1876, Bisbee was elected to the U.S. House of Representatives, representing Florida's recently created 2nd congressional district. Bisbee defeated Democratic incumbent Jesse J. Finley by just three votes. Finley successfully contested the election and was seated on February 20, 1879, less than a month before the term expired.

As Finley was not seated until after the election of 1878, Bisbee was technically still the incumbent leading into that election. Bisbee was defeated by Democratic Lieutenant Governor Noble A. Hull by just 22 votes. Bisbee successfully contested the election, taking the seat on January 22, 1881, a month and a half before the term expired.

During the 1880 elections, Hull, the technical incumbent going into the election, did not seek reelection. Bisbee and Finley again ran as the Republican and Democratic nominees. Finley won, but the election was contested by Bisbee. On June 1, 1882, Bisbee was declared the winner, meaning he would be the incumbent entering the 1882 election.

In the 1882 election, Bisbee won a decisive and undisputed victory over Finley. Bisbee ran for reelection in 1884, losing to Charles Dougherty, the former Speaker of the Florida House of Representatives.

After this loss, Bisbee retired from politics, returning to private practice.

== Personal life ==
At some point after his retirement, Bisbee married Charlotte Randolph. They had a daughter, Florence, in 1885.

Bisbee and his wife returned to Maine leaving their daughter in Jacksonville with her husband and his family.

== Death and burial ==
Bisbee died in Dixfield, Maine, on March 27, 1916. He is buried with his wife, who died twelve years later, in Dixfield's Greenwood Cemetery.

== Electoral history ==
1884 United States House of Representatives election in Florida Florida 2nd district
| Party | Candidate | Votes | % | ±% |
|---|---|---|---|---|
| Democratic | Charles Dougherty | 17,248 | 51.77% | +2.27% |
| Republican | Horatio Bisbee, Jr (inc.) | 15,857 | 47.59% | −2.91% |
| Independent Republican | Josiah T. Walls | 256 | 0.65% | N/A |
| Majority | | 1,391 | 4.18% | +3.18% |
| Turnout | | 33,320 | | |

1882 United States House of Representatives election in Florida Florida 2nd district
| Party | Candidate | Votes | % | ±% |
|---|---|---|---|---|
| Republican | Horatio Bisbee, Jr. (inc.) | 13,069 | 50.50% | +2.80% |
| Democratic | Jesse J. Finley | 12,813 | 49.50% | −2.80% |
| Majority | | 256 | 1.00% | −3.54% |
| Turnout | | 25,882 | | |

1880 United States House of Representatives election in Florida Florida 2nd district (Note: Bisbee contested Finley's election and was seated in his place on June 1, 1882)
| Party | Candidate | Votes | % | ±% |
|---|---|---|---|---|
| Democratic | Jesse J. Finley | 13,105 | 52.30% | +2.27% |
| Republican | Horatio Bisbee, Jr. (inc.) | 11,953 | 47.70% | −2.27% |
| Majority | | 1,152 | 4.60% | +4.54% |
| Turnout | | 25,058 | | |

1878 United States House of Representatives election in Florida Florida 2nd district (Note: Bisbee contested the election and was seated on January 22, 1881)
| Party | Candidate | Votes | % | ±% |
|---|---|---|---|---|
| Democratic | Noble A. Hull | 9,640 | 50.03% | +0.04% |
| Republican | Horatio Bisbee, Jr. (inc.) | 9,628 | 49.97% | −0.04% |
| Majority | | 12 | 0.06% | N/A |
| Turnout | | 19,268 | | |

1876 United States House of Representatives election in Florida Florida 2nd district (Note: Finley contested Bisbee's election and was seated in his place on February 20, 1879)
| Party | Candidate | Votes | % | ±% |
|---|---|---|---|---|
| Republican | Horatio Bisbee, Jr. | 11,574 | 50.01% | −1.12% |
| Democratic | Jesse J. Finley (inc.) | 11,571 | 49.99% | +1.12% |
| Majority | | 3 | 0.02% | −2.24% |
| Turnout | | 23,145 | | |

== Notes ==
U.S. House of Representatives
| Preceded by Jesse J. Finley | Member of the U.S. House of Representatives from Florida's 2nd congressional district March 4, 1877 – February 20, 1879 | Succeeded by Jesse J. Finley |
| Preceded by Noble A. Hull | Member of the U.S. House of Representatives from Florida's 2nd congressional district January 22, 1881 – March 3, 1881 | Succeeded by Jesse J. Finley |
| Preceded by Jesse J. Finley | Member of the U.S. House of Representatives from Florida's 2nd congressional district June 1, 1882 – March 3, 1885 | Succeeded by Charles Dougherty |
Legal offices
| Preceded by J. B. C. Drew | Florida Attorney General; 1872 | Succeeded by J. P. C. Emmons |
