= George Franklin Drew =

12th Governor of Florida

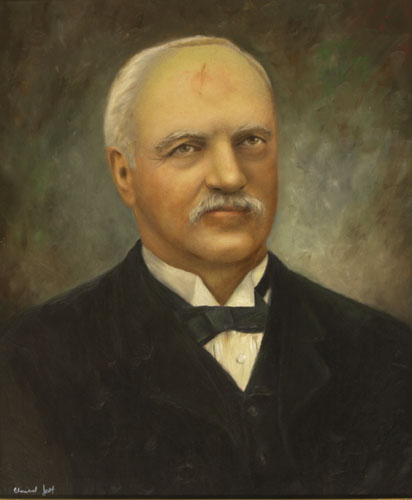

12th Governor of Florida
- In office January 2, 1877 – January 4, 1881
- Lieutenant: Noble A. Hull
- Preceded by: Marcellus Stearns
- Succeeded by: William D. Bloxham

Personal details
- Born: August 6, 1827 Alton, New Hampshire
- Died: September 26, 1900 (aged 73) Jacksonville, Florida
- Party: Democratic
- Spouse: Amelia Dickens

George Franklin Drew (August 6, 1827 – September 26, 1900) was the 12th Governor of the U.S. state of Florida. He was a Democrat.

== Early life and career ==
George Franklin Drew was born on August 6, 1827, in Alton, New Hampshire. Drew had a grammar school level education and quit going to school when he was 12 because of his family's financial problems and ended up working on the family farm. Drew moved to Lowell, Massachusetts in 1841 to become an apprentice.

He moved to the South in 1847 where he opened a machine shop in Columbus, Georgia. During the American Civil War, Drew was loyal to the Union despite living in the Confederacy. After the Civil War ended, he moved to Ellaville, Florida in 1865 where he opened the largest sawmill in Florida.

Drew was a supporter of Ulysses S. Grant's presidential run in 1868. During Reconstruction in Florida, he became the chairman of the Madison County's commissioners in 1870. Drew was a candidate for the Florida State Senate in 1872.

== Governorship ==
In 1876, Drew was elected as the Governor of Florida. His candidacy drew support from African Americans and former Southern Unionists. He was inaugurated on January 2, 1877.

As governor, Drew attempted to eliminate the state's budget deficit from the state's previous administration. His legislative program followed the economic orthodoxy of the Bourbon Democrats. Drew proposed cutting expenditures to eliminate Florida's budget deficit. He closed the state prison at Chattahoochee and introduced a system of convict leasing.

With regards to education, Drew said it was “cheaper to build schoolhouses and maintain schools than to build poorhouses and jails and support paupers and criminals.” He believed that the state had a responsibility to support the education of African Americans. Minor improvements were made to public school system at the elementary level, such as encouragement of rural education and standardization of textbooks. Drew's support did not extent to public high schools which he advocated eliminating. During Drew's administration he decided to abandon the Florida Agriculture College which was set to open in Eau Gallie.

Drew opted to not seek a second term in 1880.

== Later life and death ==
He left office on January 4, 1881, returning to the lumber business. Later in life, he settled in Jacksonville serving as the president of the city's trade board. Drew died on September 26, 1900, in Jacksonville.

Party political offices
Preceded by William D. Bloxham	Democratic nominee for Governor of Florida; 1876	Succeeded by William D. Bloxham
Political offices
Preceded by Marcellus L. Stearns	Governor of Florida; January 2, 1877 – January 4, 1881	Succeeded by William D. Bloxham
