= Moongate =

Moongate can refer to several things:

- A moon gate is a circular passageway found in Chinese, Japanese and Bermudian architecture

== Books ==
- Moongate (book), a book by William L. Brian II alleging a conspiracy around the Apollo Moon landings
- Moongate (novel), a 2002 science fiction novel by William Proctor and David Weldon

== Video game ==
- Moongates are magical doorways in the Ultima game series.
