= Tracy Upchurch =

American politician (born 1956)

Member of the Florida House of Representatives from the 20th district
- In office 1992–1996
- Preceded by: Kathy Chinoy
- Succeeded by: Doug Wiles

Personal details
- Born: November 3, 1956 (age 69) St. Augustine, Florida, U.S.
- Party: Democratic
- Parent: Hamilton Upchurch (father)
- Relatives: Frank Upchurch (grandfather); John J. Upchurch (great-grandfather)
- Education: Florida State University; Davidson College; University of Florida

Tracy W. Upchurch (born November 3, 1956) is an American politician. He served as a Democratic member for the 20th district of the Florida House of Representatives.

== Life and career ==
Upchurch was born in St. Augustine, Florida. He attended Florida State University, Davidson College and the University of Florida.

In 1992, Upchurch was elected to represent the 20th district of the Florida House of Representatives, succeeding Kathy G. Chinoy. He served until 1996, when he was succeeded by Doug Wiles.
