= Flagler College – Tallahassee Campus =

Branch campus of Flager College

Coordinates: 30.443°N 84.340°W

Flagler College Tallahassee
- Type: Private satellite campus
- Established: 2000
- Endowment: US$60 million
- Chancellor: William L. Proctor
- President: Joseph Joyner
- Administrative staff: 20
- Students: 400
- Location: Tallahassee, Florida, U.S.
- Colors: Crimson and gold
- Nickname: Saints
- Website: www.flagler.edu/flagler-college-tallahassee/

Flagler College Tallahassee was a branch campus of Flagler College, a private liberal arts college in St. Augustine, Florida. It was hosted through Tallahassee State College and was founded in 2000 as the product of a legislative mandate to expand opportunities for four year degree-seeking students. The campus offered bachelor's degree programs in six majors and four minors. The campus officially closed in May 2024. The closure was prompted by changes in the Florida higher education system, including Tallahassee Community College's expansion to offer four-year degrees, which reduced the need for a separate Flagler College branch in the region. The campus's programs were phased out, and the final graduating class marked the end of its academic offerings in Tallahassee.

== History ==
This branch campus of Flagler College was the outcome of a combined effort between former Tallahassee Community College President T. K. Wetherell and past Flagler College President, and current Chancellor, William L. Proctor; the two were longtime colleagues, knowing each other from Wetherell's time playing for the Florida State Seminoles where Proctor served as assistant football coach.

When Florida's Legislature passed a mandate to increase opportunities for four year degree-seeking students through two year institutions, Wetherell contacted Proctor to begin development of a Flagler College branch through the TSC campus. As a result, Flagler College Tallahassee opened its doors in the Fall Semester of 2000 with its first class of 56 students graduating in 2002. The school produced over 2,800 graduates across multiple disciplines.

== Academics ==
The campus offered Bachelor of Arts and Bachelor of Science degrees. Admission was open to students who have earned an Associate of Arts (AA) degree, or 60 transferable college credits, in addition to meeting major requirements. To have been considered for acceptance, prospective students must have provided an application for admission and sealed official transcripts from all schools attended. If transferring from TSC, a degree audit was required. The college's acceptance rate was an average of 60 percent of its annual applications.
