= 1944 Florida gubernatorial election =

- November 7, 1944
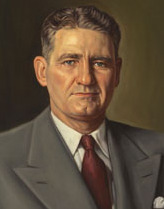

Nominee	Millard Caldwell	Bert L. Acker
Party	Democratic	Republican
Popular vote	361,007	96,321
Percentage	78.94%	21.06%
- County results Caldwell: 60–70% 70–80% 80–90% >90%
Governor before election
Spessard Holland
Democratic
Elected Governor
Millard Caldwell
Democratic

The 1944 Florida gubernatorial election was held on November 7, 1944. Democratic nominee Millard Caldwell defeated Republican nominee Bert L. Acker with 78.94% of the vote.

== Primary elections ==
Primary elections were held on May 2, 1944, with the Democratic runoff held on May 23, 1944.

=== Democratic primary ===
==== Candidates ====
- J. Edwin Baker, former Florida state senator
- Millard Caldwell, former U.S. representative for the 3rd district
- Ernest R. Graham, Florida state senator
- Robert A. (Lex) Green, U.S. representative for the at-large district
- Raymond Sheldon, state senator
- Frank Upchurch, Florida state senator

==== Results ====
Democratic primary runoff by county Caldwell: 50–60%; 60–70%; 70–80%; Green: 50–60%; 60–70%; 80–90%

Democratic primary results
Party	Candidate	Votes	%
Democratic	Millard F. Caldwell	116,111	28.39
Democratic	Robert A. Green	113,300	27.90
Democratic	Ernest R. Graham	91,174	22.45
Democratic	Frank Upchurch	30,524	7.52
Democratic	Raymond Sheldon	27,940	6.88
Democratic	J. Edwin Baker	27,028	6.66
Total votes		406,077	100.00

Democratic primary runoff results
Party	Candidate	Votes	%
Democratic	Millard F. Caldwell	215,485	55.31
Democratic	Robert A. Green	174,100	44.69
Total votes		389,585	100.00

=== Republican primary ===
==== Candidates ====
- Bert L. Acker, public relations consultant, unsuccessful candidate for Florida's 4th US Congressional district in 1940 and 1942.
- Edward T. Keenan

==== Results ====
Republican primary results
Party	Candidate	Votes	%
Republican	Bert L. Acker	5,954	61.26
Republican	Edward T. Keenan	3,766	38.75
Total votes		9,720	100.00

== General election ==
Bert Acker who ran as a Republican, would be against the New Deal in his campaign. He also wanted to eliminate laws he thought were useless and conflicting. Acker was in favor of leasing lands owned by the state government to be used by farmers and cattle ranchers. Acker wanted to allow mining and oil production to be done on state owned lands as well. Acker wanted to see the sugar industry in the state expanded as well. Acker was against taxes that were created as a result of World War II in the state and wanted to exempt homes that were valued at $15,000 from state taxes. In terms of infrastructure, he supported expanding the state highway system and widening roads physically themselves along with improving safety on bridges.

=== Candidates ===
- Millard Caldwell, Democratic
- Bert Acker, Republican

=== Results ===
1944 Florida gubernatorial election
Party	Candidate	Votes	%	±%
Democratic	Millard F. Caldwell	361,007	78.94%	
Republican	Bert L. Acker	96,321	21.06%	
Majority		264,686	57.88%	
Turnout		457,328	100.00%	
Democratic hold		Swing		

== Bibliography ==
- Morris, Allen (1965). The Florida Handbook, 1965-66. Tallahassee, FL: The Peninsular Publishing Company.
- Glashan, Roy R. (1979). American Governors and Gubernatorial Elections, 1775-1978. Meckler Books. ISBN 0-930466-17-9.
- Gubernatorial Elections, 1787-1997. Washington, D.C.: Congressional Quarterly Inc. 1998. ISBN 1-56802-396-0.
