= John H. Smithwick =

U.S. Representative from Florida

John Smithwick
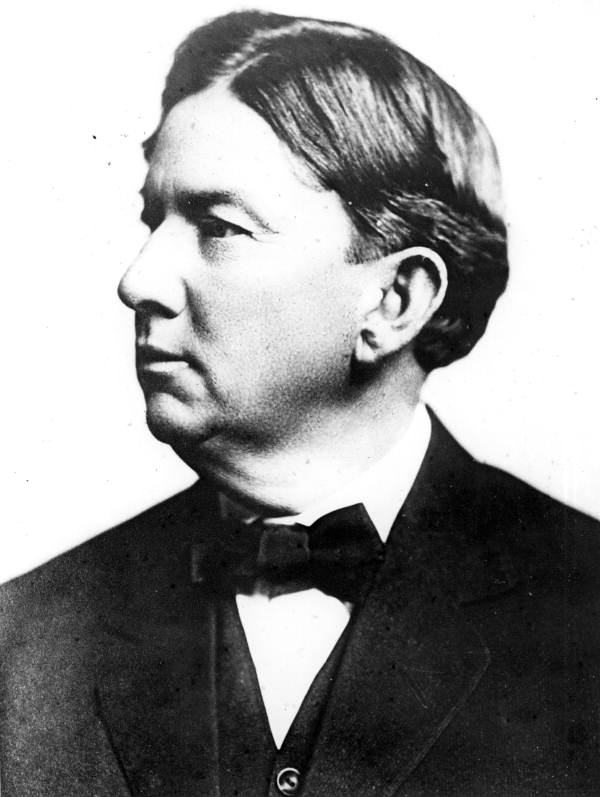

Member of the U.S. House of Representatives from Florida's 3rd district
- In office March 4, 1919 – March 4, 1927
- Preceded by: Walter Kehoe
- Succeeded by: Tom Yon

Personal details
- Born: John Harris Smithwick; July 17, 1872 Orange, Georgia, U.S.
- Died: December 2, 1948 (aged 76) Moultrie, Georgia
- Resting place: Westview Cemetery
- Party: Democratic
- Education: Reinhardt Normal College; Cumberland University

John Harris Smithwick (July 17, 1872 – December 2, 1948) was an American lawyer and politician who served four terms as a U.S. representative from Florida from 1919 to 1927.

== Biography ==
Smithwick was born near Orange, Georgia and attended the public schools. He graduated from Reinhardt Normal College in Waleska, Georgia in 1895 and from Cumberland University's law school in Lebanon, Tennessee in 1897.

=== Early career ===
Admitted to the bar in 1898, Smithwick entered private practice in Moultrie, Georgia. He moved to Pensacola, Florida in 1906.

=== Congress ===
Smithwick was elected as a Democrat to the 66th, 67th, 68th, and 69th Congresses, serving from March 4, 1919, to March 3, 1927. He was among those injured in the January 1922 Knickerbocker Theatre roof collapse. Smithwick was an unsuccessful candidate for renomination in 1926, losing the primary election to Tallahassee businessman Tom Yon.

=== Later career and retirement ===
He engaged in the real estate business in Washington, D.C., and Fort Myers, Florida before retiring in 1932 and resided in Moultrie, Georgia.

=== Death and burial ===
He died on December 2, 1948. He was interred in Westview Cemetery.

U.S. House of Representatives
Preceded by Walter Kehoe	Member of the U.S. House of Representatives from Florida's 3rd congressional district 1919 – 1927	Succeeded by Tom A. Yon
