= Frank Upchurch =

American politician

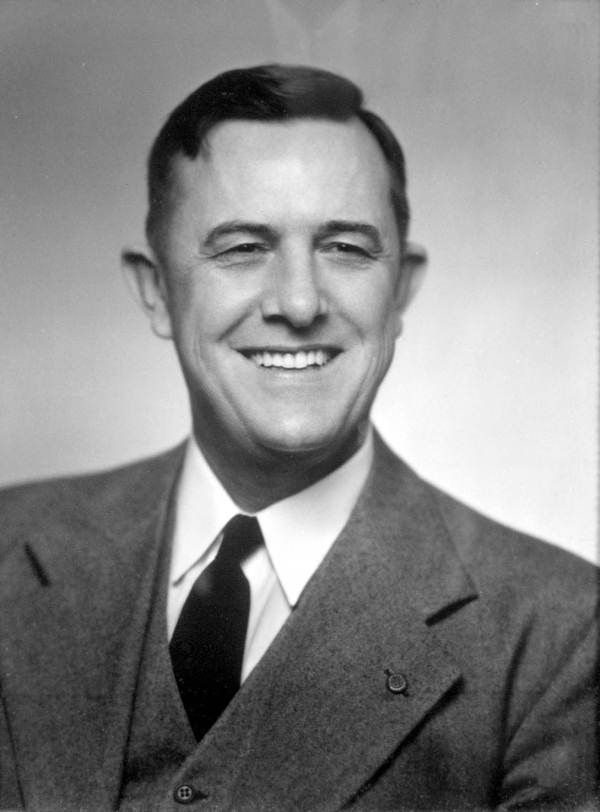
- Upchurch in 1943

Member of the Florida Senate from the 31st district
- In office 1943
- Preceded by: Jurant T. Shepherd
- Succeeded by: Walter B. Fraser

Member of the Florida House of Representatives from Nassau County
- In office 1921

Personal details
- Born: February 25, 1894
- Died: June 2, 1986 (aged 92)
- Party: Democratic
- Children: Judge Frank Upchurch Jr. Hamilton Upchurch
- Relatives: Tracy Upchurch (grandson)

Frank Drew Upchurch (February 25, 1894 – June 2, 1986) was an American politician. He served as a Democratic member of both houses of the Florida Legislature.

== Biography ==
Upchurch born February 25, 1894, and was raised in Racepond, Georgia. Upchurch was a veteran of World War I, serving in the United States Marine Corps. He represented Nassau County in the Florida House of Representatives in 1921 alongside C. C. Fuqua. before moving to St. Augustine. He then became the city's Mayor in 1928. He served as a member for the 31st district of the Florida Senate in 1943.

Upchurch ran for governor in 1944, but was defeated by Millard Caldwell. Upchurch was a leader in the conservative bloc of the Florida Democratic Party and a rival of U.S. Senator Claude Pepper. He led the movement to send unpledged delegates to the 1944 Democratic National Convention in order to oppose Democratic incumbent Franklin D. Roosevelt. Four years later, he served as the chair of its delegation to the 1948 Democratic National Convention. After the embrace of a civil rights plank, Upchurch joined Dixiecratic revolt and was one of four slated electors for the campaign of Strom Thurmond. He died on June 2, 1986.
