= Tom Yon =

American politician

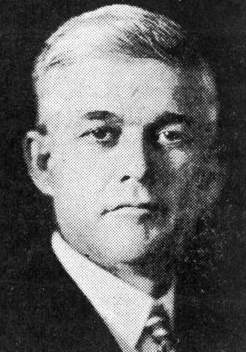

Member of the U.S. House of Representatives from Florida's 3rd district
- In office March 4, 1927 – March 4, 1933
- Preceded by: John H. Smithwick
- Succeeded by: Millard Caldwell

Personal details
- Born: Thomas Alva Yon; March 14, 1882 Blountstown, Florida, U.S.
- Died: February 16, 1971 (aged 88) Tallahassee, Florida, U.S.
- Resting place: Oakland Cemetery, Tallahassee, Florida, U.S.
- Party: Democratic
- Spouse: Daisy Mullikin
- Children: 1
- Parents: Higdon Almarin Yon (father); Laura D. Lockey (mother)
- Education: Lanier Southern Business College

Thomas Alva Yon (March 14, 1882 – February 16, 1971) was an American politician and businessman who served three terms in the United States House of Representatives as a Democrat from Florida from 1927 to 1933.

== Life ==
Thomas Alva Yon was born to Higdon Almarin Yon and Laura D. Lockey near Blountstown, Florida on March 14, 1882. At the age of five, his family moved to a farm in Jackson County, Florida. Yon attended rural schools and graduated from Lanier Southern Business College in Macon, Georgia in 1903. He returned to Blountstown in 1903 and engaged in mercantile pursuits until 1906. He engaged as a traveling salesman in Tallahassee, Florida from 1906 to 1927. He served as delegate to the 1920 Democratic National Convention.

=== Congress ===
Yon was elected as a Democrat to the United States House of Representatives in the 1926 elections, and was twice re-elected, serving from March 4, 1927 to March 4, 1933, in the 70th, 71st, and 72nd Congresses. He was an unsuccessful candidate for renomination in 1932.

He was a supporter of the building of Naval Air Station Pensacola. During the 1932 Democratic Party presidential primaries he supported Governor Franklin D. Roosevelt for the nomination.

=== Later career ===
Yon served as a special and commercial agent in the Bureau of Foreign and Domestic Commerce of the United States Department of Commerce in Washington, D.C. from 1933 to 1940. He served as assistant investigator in the Division of Investigation of the General Accounting Office from 1941 until his retirement in January 1946.

=== Retirement and death ===
Yon engaged in development and sale of his Florida real estate holdings after retirement.

On February 16, 1971 Yon died in Tallahassee, Florida in 1971, and was interred in Oakland Cemetery.

== Electoral history ==
Tom Yon electoral history

1926 Florida's 3rd Congressional District election
Party	Candidate	Votes	%	±%
Democratic	Tom Yon	7,156	86.85%	+2.72%
Republican	J.H. Drummond	1,084	13.16%	−2.72%
Total votes		'8,240'	'100.00%'	

1928 Florida's 3rd Congressional District Democratic primary
Party	Candidate	Votes	%	±%
Democratic	Tom Yon (incumbent)	21,439	44.43%	
Democratic	W. L. Wilson	16,223	33.62%	
Democratic	John H. Smithwick	10,592	21.95%	
Total votes		'48,254'	'100.00%'	

1928 Florida's 3rd Congressional District election
Party	Candidate	Votes	%	±%
Democratic	Tom Yon (incumbent)	22,167	100.00%	+13.15%
Total votes		'22,167'	'100.00%'	

1930 Florida's 3rd Congressional District election
Party	Candidate	Votes	%	±%
Democratic	Tom Yon (incumbent)	11,796	100.00%	−/+0.00%
Total votes		'22,167'	'100.00%'	

U.S. House of Representatives
Preceded by John H. Smithwick	Member of the U.S. House of Representatives from Florida's 3rd congressional district 1927 – 1933	Succeeded by Millard Caldwell
