= Hamilton Upchurch =

American politician (1925–2008)

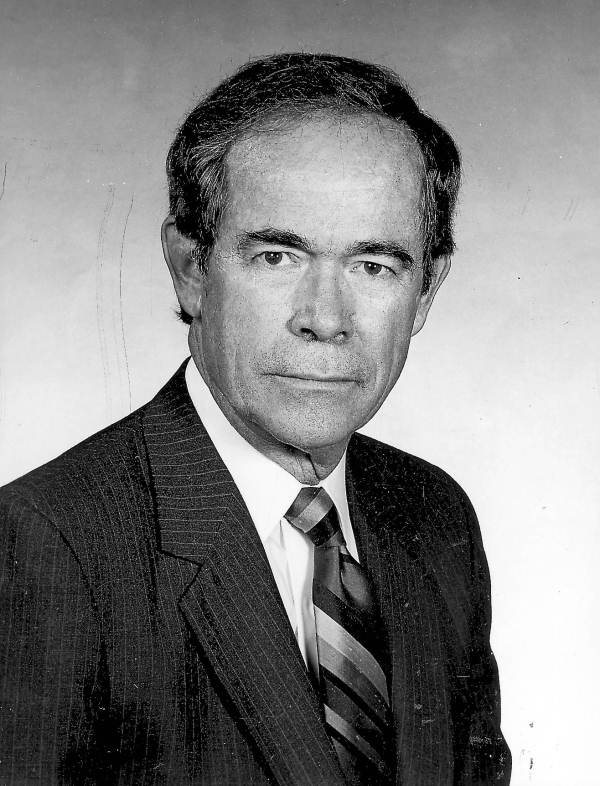
- Upchurch in 1984

Member of the Florida House of Representatives from the 28th district
- In office 1978–1982
- Preceded by: Gus Craig
- Succeeded by: Sam Bell

Member of the Florida House of Representatives from the 22nd district
- In office 1982–1988
- Preceded by: Steve Pajcic
- Succeeded by: Roy Campbell

Personal details
- Born: September 25, 1925
- Died: January 8, 2008 (aged 82)
- Party: Democratic
- Children: Tracy Upchurch
- Parent: Frank Upchurch (father)
- Relatives: John J. Upchurch (grandfather)
- Education: University of Florida

Hamilton D. Upchurch (September 25, 1925 – January 8, 2008) was an American politician. He served as a Democratic member for the 22nd and 28th district of the Florida House of Representatives.

== Life and career ==
Upchurch was born September 25, 1925, in St. Augustine, Florida. He attended the University of Florida and earned a degree in business administration followed by obtaining his Juris Doctor in 1951.

In 1978, Upchurch was elected to represent the 28th district of the Florida House of Representatives, succeeding Gus Craig. He served until 1982, when he was succeeded by Sam Bell. In the same year, he was elected to represent the 22nd district, succeeding Steve Pajcic. He served until 1988, when he was succeeded by Roy Campbell.

Upchurch died January 8, 2008, of cancer, at the age of 82.
