= Altha, Florida =

- Town
- Town of Altha
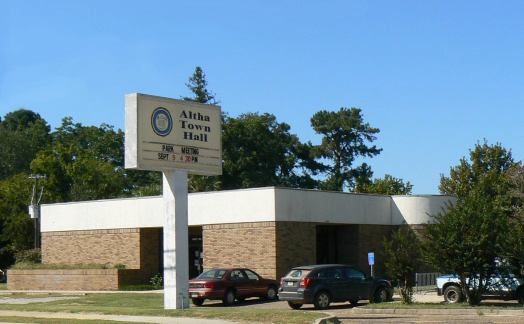
- Altha Town Hall on September 25, 2008

- Seal

- Location of Altha in Calhoun County, Florida.
- Coordinates: 30°34′17″N 85°07′22″W
- Country: United States
- State: Florida
- County: Calhoun
- Settled: 1902
- Incorporated: 1946

Government
  - Type: Mayor-Council
  - Mayor: John Phelps
  - Council Chair: Jonathan Connelly
  - Council Vice Chair: Jamie Strickland
  - Councilmembers: Charlie McNew, Debbie Barfield, and Frank Barbato
  - Town Clerk: Dustin Graham

Area
  - Total: 1.37 sq mi (3.54 km^{2})
  - Land: 1.34 sq mi (3.46 km^{2})
  - Water: 0.031 sq mi (0.08 km^{2})
- Elevation: 210 ft (64 m)

Population (2020)
  - Total: 496
  - Density: 371/sq mi (143.2/km^{2})
- Time zone: UTC-6 (Central (CST))
  - Summer (DST): UTC-5 (CDT)
- ZIP code: 32421
- Area code(s): 850, 448
- FIPS code: 12-01000
- GNIS feature ID: 2405144
- Website: www.townofaltha.org

Altha is a small town in Calhoun County, Florida, United States. It is part of the Florida Panhandle in North Florida. The population was 496 at the 2020 census, a decrease from 536 at the 2010 census.

== History ==
Altha was first settled in 1902, and the Town of Altha was officially incorporated as a municipality in 1946.

== Geography ==
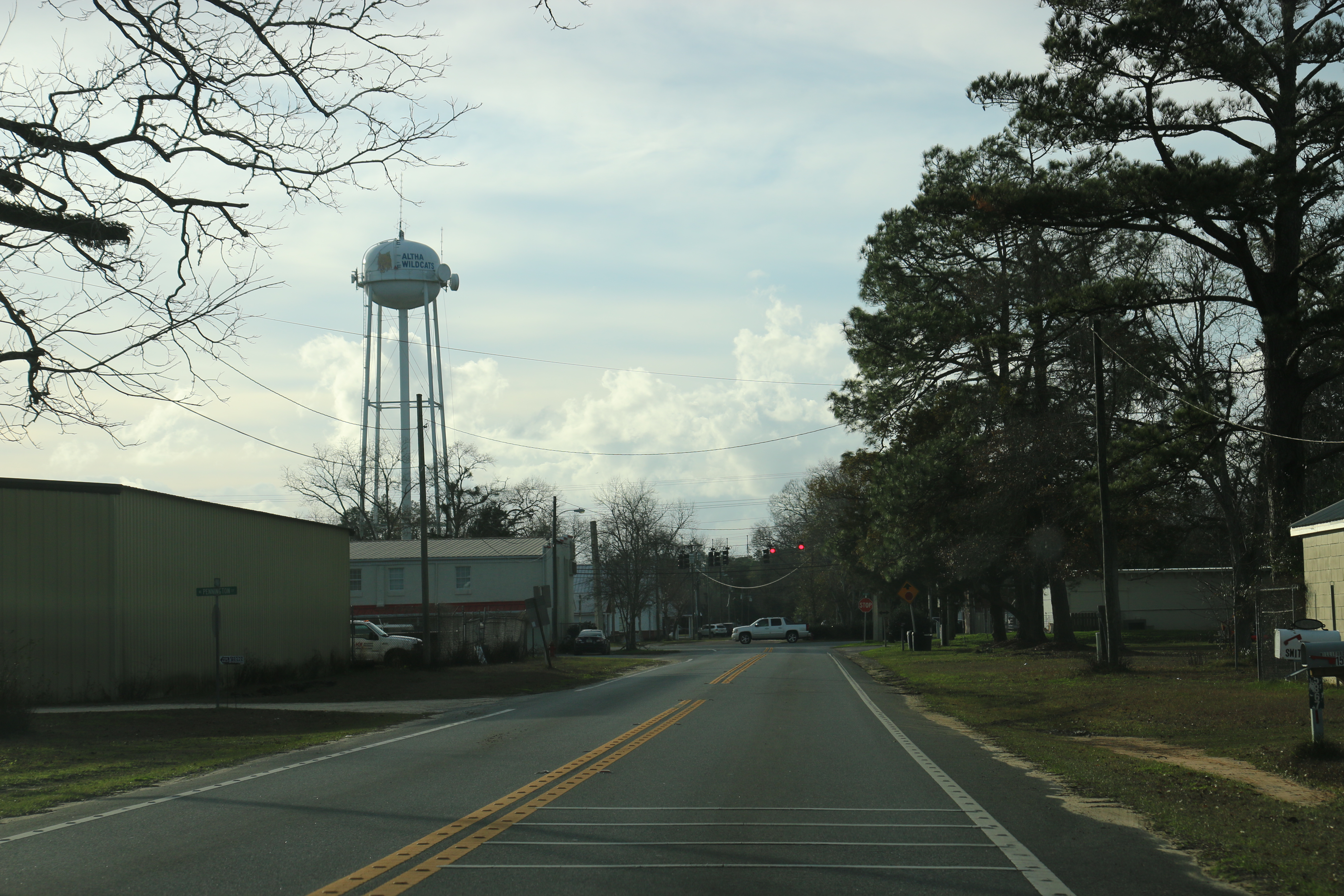
Downtown Altha

According to the United States Census Bureau, the town has a total area of 1.5 square miles (3.9 km^{2}), of which 1.4 square miles (3.6 km^{2}) is land and 0.04 square miles (0.10 km^{2}) (2.72%) is water.

Altha is located in northwestern Florida, approximately 45 minutes from the Georgia state line and one hour from the Alabama state line. Altha is in a rural county, with the primary industry being agriculture. Tomatoes, watermelons, green vegetables, cucumbers, peanuts, corn, wheat, and cotton are all major crops in this farming area. The timber industry also thrives in the area, with many farmers electing to plant pine trees.

=== Climate ===
The climate in this area is characterized by hot, humid summers and generally mild winters. According to the Köppen climate classification, the Town of Altha has a humid subtropical climate zone (Cfa).

Altha has an average high temperature of 76 degrees Fahrenheit, with an average low of 51 degrees Fahrenheit. Summers in this area are quite hot and humid, with afternoon showers frequently occurring during the summer months. Altha is located about 35 miles from the Gulf of Mexico, so when tropical storms or hurricanes approach the coastline, weather can become severe.

The coldest part of the winter occurs during late January and early February. Temperatures at night can dip as low as the lower 30s, and in some isolated instances, even striking the low to mid 20s. The last measurable snowfall occurred on December 23, 1989, where 2 inches of snow fell. January and February can be cool months, with temperatures occasionally struggling to reach 60 degrees Fahrenheit.

In 2004, during Hurricane Ivan, dozens of homes were destroyed and 54~ people were killed because of a severe tornado striking near the town.

In October 2018, Altha and the surrounding areas were hit by Hurricane Michael, which was listed as a category 5 hurricane, and the strongest to ever hit Northwest Florida, caused extensive damage to the town. The old high school building, known as "the White building", and many homes were damaged and/or destroyed as a result.

== Demographics ==
Historical population
Census	Pop.	Note	%±
1950	434		—
1960	413		−4.8%
1970	423		2.4%
1980	478		13.0%
1990	497		4.0%
2000	506		1.8%
2010	536		5.9%
2020	496		−7.5%
U.S. Decennial Census

=== 2010 and 2020 census ===
Altha racial composition (Hispanics excluded from racial categories) (NH = Non-Hispanic)
Race	Pop 2010	Pop 2020	% 2010	% 2020
White (NH)	495	441	92.35%	88.91%
Black or African American (NH)	7	4	1.31%	0.81%
Native American or Alaska Native (NH)	0	1	0.00%	0.20%
Asian (NH)	1	0	0.19%	0.00%
Pacific Islander or Native Hawaiian (NH)	0	0	0.00%	0.00%
Some other race (NH)	1	0	0.19%	0.00%
Two or more races/Multiracial (NH)	6	19	1.12%	3.83%
Hispanic or Latino (any race)	26	31	4.85%	6.25%
Total	536	496		

As of the 2020 United States census, there were 496 people, 187 households, and 116 families residing in the town.

As of the 2010 United States census, there were 536 people, 198 households, and 144 families residing in the town.

In 2010, the population was 47% male and 53% female. 33% of the population was under 18 and 15.5% was 65 or over.

=== 2000 census ===
As of the census of 2000, there are 506 people, 204 households, and 128 families residing in the town. The population density is 136.6 people/km^{2} (354 people/mi^{2}). There are 226 housing units at an average density of 61.0 units/km^{2} (158 units/mi^{2}). The racial makeup of the town is 95.85% White, 0.20% African American, 0.40% Native American, 0.20% Asian, 0.00% Pacific Islander, 2.57% from other races, and 0.79% from two or more races. 5.93% of the population are Hispanic or Latino of any race.

In 2000, there are 204 households out of which 30.9% have children under the age of 18 living with them, 44.6% are married couples living together, 13.2% have a female householder with no husband present, and 36.8% are non-families. 31.9% of all households are made up of individuals and 16.2% have someone living alone who is 65 years of age or older. The average household size is 2.48 and the average family size is 3.04.

In 2000, in the town, the age distribution is 25.5% under the age of 18, 9.5% from 18 to 24, 28.1% from 25 to 44, 20.8% from 45 to 64, and 16.2% who are 65 years of age or older. The median age is 38 years. For every 100 females there are 94.6 males. For every 100 females age 18 and over, there are 92.3 males.

In 2000, the median income for a household in the town is $27,917, and the median income for a family is $40,156. Males have a median income of $26,389 versus $22,000 for females. The per capita income for the town is $12,677. 17.3% of the population and 8.5% of families are below the poverty line. Out of the total population, 7.2% of those under the age of 18 and 29.2% of those 65 and older are living below the poverty line.

== Education ==
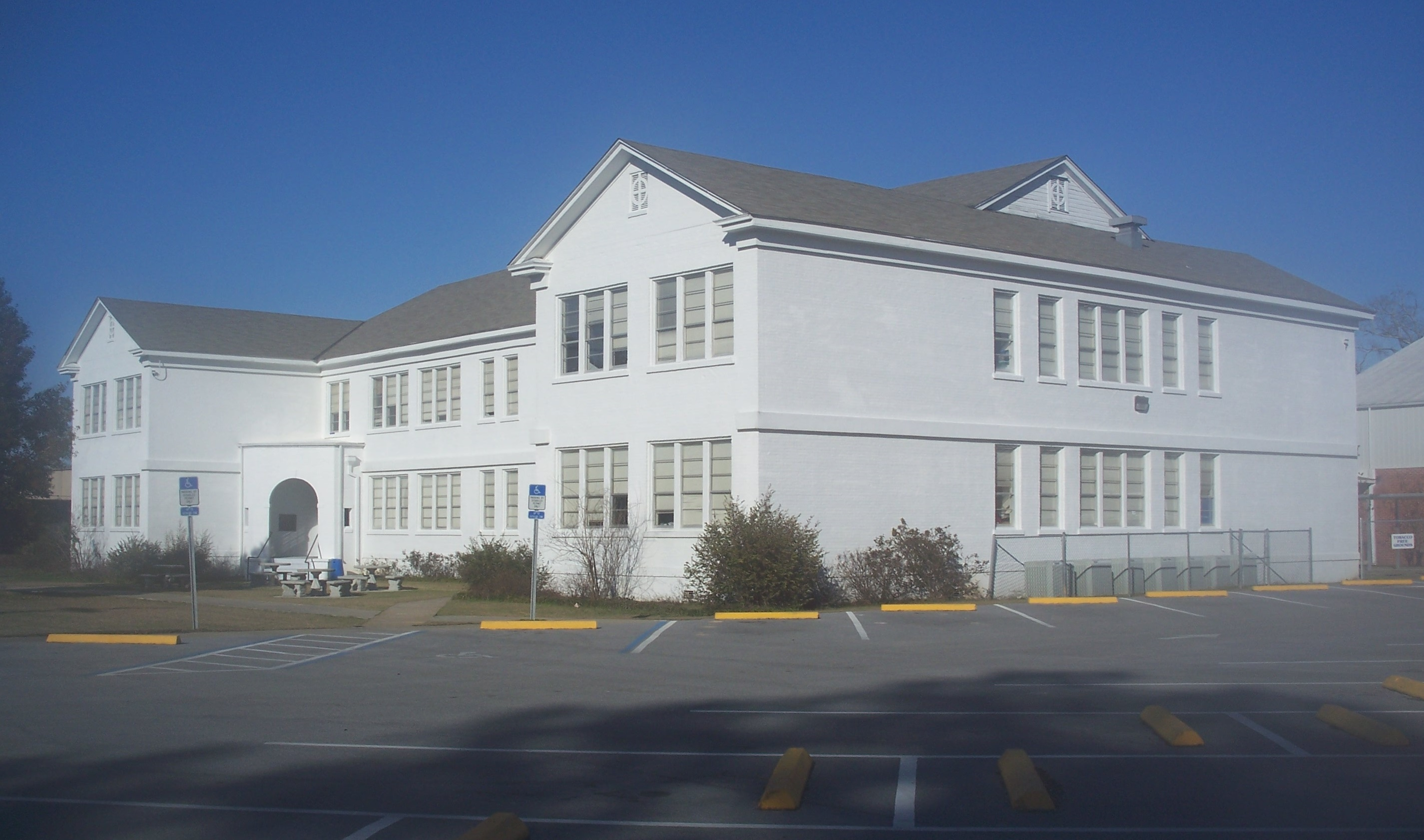
Altha School on February 12, 2011, before it was destroyed by Hurricane Michael and demolished soon after, in October 2018.

Altha, served by the Calhoun County School District is home to the K–12 Altha Public School, established early after the turn of the twentieth century.

The "white building", as it was known as, has since been demolished due to Hurricane Michael. The school has since been rebuilt on the previous school's site, retaining its same name, and currently serves as the town's only public school.

=== School sports ===
The girls' volleyball team has won numerous district, region, and state semi-finals playoffs as well. Altha School runs boys' basketball, volleyball, softball, baseball, weightlifting, and a cross-country team. The girls' and boys' weightlifting teams have won several state championships.

== Businesses and attractions ==
The largest employer in Altha is Oglesby Plants International. The Chipola River, about three miles west of Altha, offers swimming, tubing, canoeing, kayaking, and fishing opportunities.
