= Gary Cunningham (disambiguation) =

Gary Cunningham is a former college basketball coach and college athletic director.

Gary Cunningham can also refer to:

- Gary Cunningham (ice hockey) (born 1950), Canadian retired ice hockey player
- Gary Cunningham (rugby union) (born 1955), New Zealand former rugby union player
- Gary R. Cunningham (1932/1933–2008), Florida politician
