= Calhoun Correctional Institution =

Prison in Florida, United States

Coordinates: 30°24′27″N 85°03′54″W

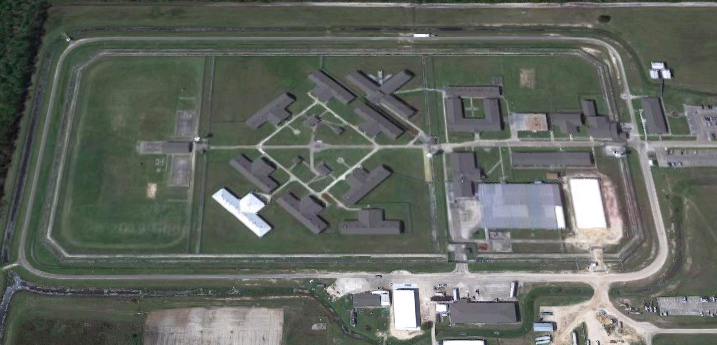
- Aerial view of Calhoun Correctional Institution
- Interactive map of Calhoun Correctional Institution
- Location: Blountstown, Calhoun County, Florida
- Status: Operational
- Security class: Minimum, medium, and close
- Capacity: 1,221
- Population: 1,149 (August 28, 2025)
- Opened: 1988
- Warden: Patricia Rodgers
- Website: https://www.fdc.myflorida.com/institutions/institutions-list/105

The Calhoun Correctional Institution is a state-operated prison for men located in Blountstown, Calhoun County, Florida, owned and operated by the Florida Department of Corrections. This facility has a mix of security levels, including minimum, medium, and close, and houses adult male offenders. Calhoun first opened in 1988 and has a maximum capacity of 1221 prisoners.
