= Sam Bell (Florida politician) =

American politician (1939–2023)

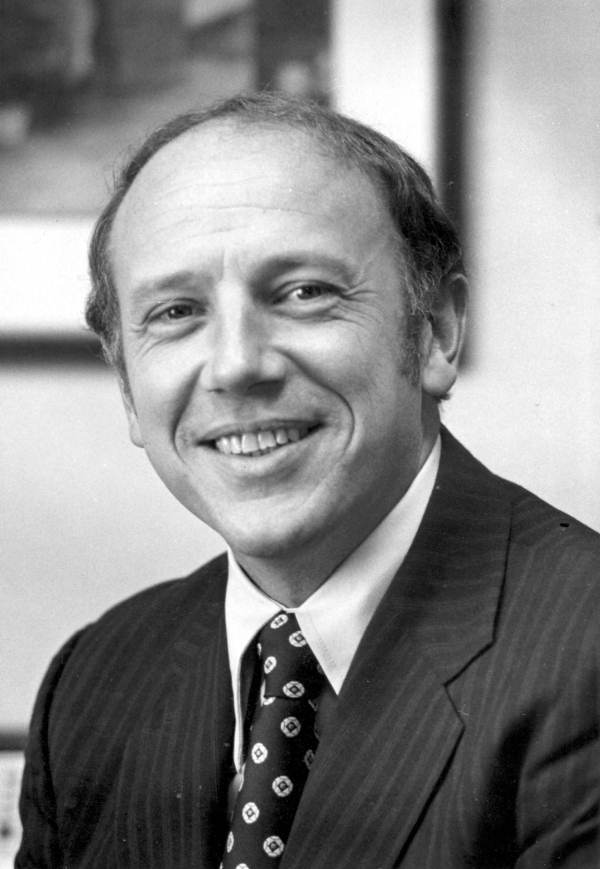
- Bell in 1978

Member of the Florida House of Representatives
- In office November 5, 1974 – November 8, 1988
- Preceded by: Gary R. Cunningham
- Succeeded by: Richard S. Graham
- Constituency: 30th district (1974–1982); 28th district (1982–1988)

Personal details
- Born: May 21, 1939 Charleston, West Virginia, U.S.
- Died: March 14, 2023 (aged 83)
- Party: Democratic
- Education: Dartmouth College; Duke University

Samuel P. Bell III (May 21, 1939 – March 14, 2023) was an American politician. He served as a Democratic member for the 28th and 30th district of the Florida House of Representatives.

== Life and career ==
Bell was born May 21, 1939 in Charleston, West Virginia to minister and teacher Sam Bell. He attended Dartmouth College and Duke University.

In 1974, Bell was elected to represent the 30th district of the Florida House of Representatives, succeeding Gary R. Cunningham. He served until 1982, when he was succeeded by Tom Brown. In the same year, he was elected to represent the 28th district, succeeding Hamilton Upchurch. He served until 1988, when he was succeeded by Richard S. Graham.

Bell died on March 14, 2023, at the age of 83.
