= Blountstown High School =

Public school in Blountstown, Calhoun, Florida, USA

Location
- 18597 NE SR69; Blountstown, Calhoun, Florida 32424-1767; United States; 30.448078°N 85.045959°W

Information
- Type: Public
- Established: 1929
- Locale: Blountstown, Florida
- School district: Calhoun County School District
- Principal: Tracy Wood
- Teaching staff: 38.50 (FTE)
- Grades: 9-12
- Enrollment: 685 (2023-2024)
- Student to teacher ratio: 17.79
- Colors: Red and white
- Mascot: Tigers
- Website: www.blountstownhigh.org

Blountstown High School is a high school located in Blountstown, Florida, the county seat of Calhoun County, Florida. It is in the Calhoun School District. In 2026 about 70 percent of students were white, 17 percent black and 7 percent hispanic. Test scores were above state averages.

During segregation, African American students attended Mayhaw High School. A history project fornthe community around it was initiated.

The Florida Archives have a photo of a graduating class at the school.
