= Altha Public School =

School in Florida, United States

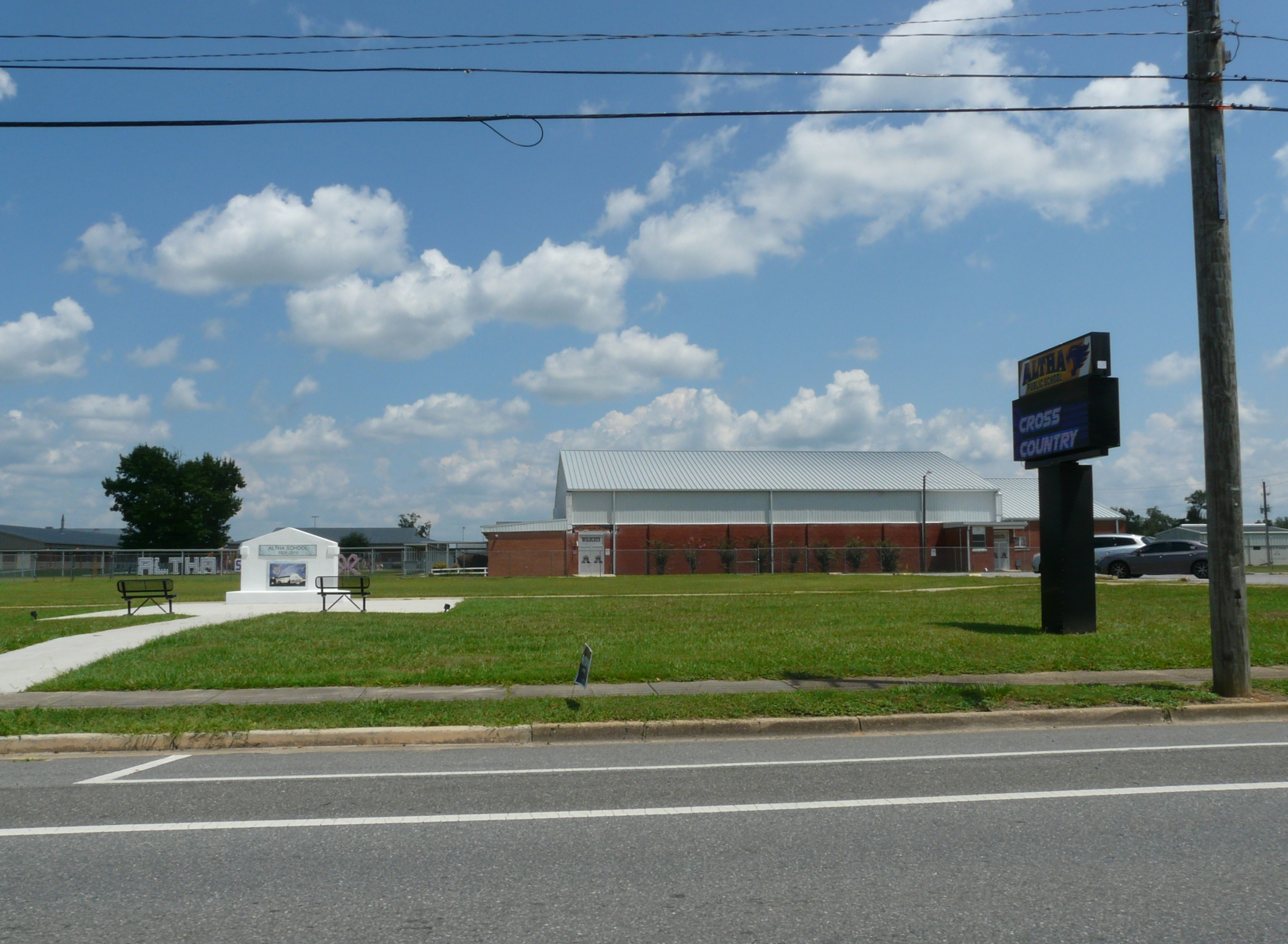

Location
- 25820 NE Fuqua Circle; Altha, Florida 3241-3485; United States; 30.5732°N 85.1250°W

Information
- Type: Public school
- School district: Calhoun County School District
- Principal: Treva McCroan
- Faculty: 39.32 (FTE)
- Grades: K–12
- Enrollment: 645 (2021–22)
- Student to teacher ratio: 16.49
- Colors: Purple and Gold
- Mascot: Wildcats
- Website: www.althaschool.org

Altha Public School is a K–12 public school in Altha, Florida, operated by the Calhoun County School District. As of 2017 it had about 600 students.

It was established early after the turn of the twentieth century. The "White Building", as it was nicknamed, housed several classrooms until the completion of the new school in 2017. The White Building was completed in 1929, and was renovated several times to retain its period decor while being outfitted for the 21st century. Due to damages sustained during Hurricane Michael, the White Building was demolished in August of 2019.

Altha School is a Kindergarten through 12th grade school (previously having a Pre-Kindergarten), one of fewer than 20 remaining such schools in the state of Florida. In 2006, the high school portion of the school was nearly closed and consolidated with Blountstown High. In 2014, the Florida Legislature awarded the Calhoun County School Board over 20 million dollars to build a new school in Altha; it ultimately had a cost of $24 million. The groundbreaking ceremony was scheduled for February 20, 2015, and the new building opened in January 2017.

The school mascot is the Wildcat, and school colors are purple and gold. Approximately 600 students attend Altha School, a number that surpasses the town population of 536. Clubs active at Altha School include FCCLA, FBLA, Beta, SWAT and FFA. Ranked one of the top schools in Florida, Altha students consistently score well above state average on FCAT (Florida Comprehensive Assessment Test) testing. Altha School is consistently graded as an "A school each year on the Governor's A+ School Grade program.

In October 2014, Altha Middle School FFA was named the National Chapter of the Year at the National FFA Convention in Louisville, Kentucky.
