= Flagler College =

Private Liberal-Arts College in St. Augustine, Florida, US

Coordinates: 29.89237°N 81.31522°W

- Type: Private, liberal arts
- Established: 1968; 58 years ago
- Endowment: $99.05 million (2025)
- Chancellor: William L. Proctor
- President: John A. Delaney
- Students: 2,574
- Location: St. Augustine, Florida, U.S.
- Campus: Suburban, 19 acres (7.7 ha)
- Colors: Crimson & Gold
- Nickname: Saints
- Sporting affiliations: NCAA Division II – Peach Belt
- Website: flagler.edu

Flagler College is a private liberal arts college in St. Augustine, Florida, United States. The school was founded in 1968 and offers 44 undergraduate majors and two master's programs. It also operated the Flagler College – Tallahassee Campus from 2000 to 2024.

== History ==
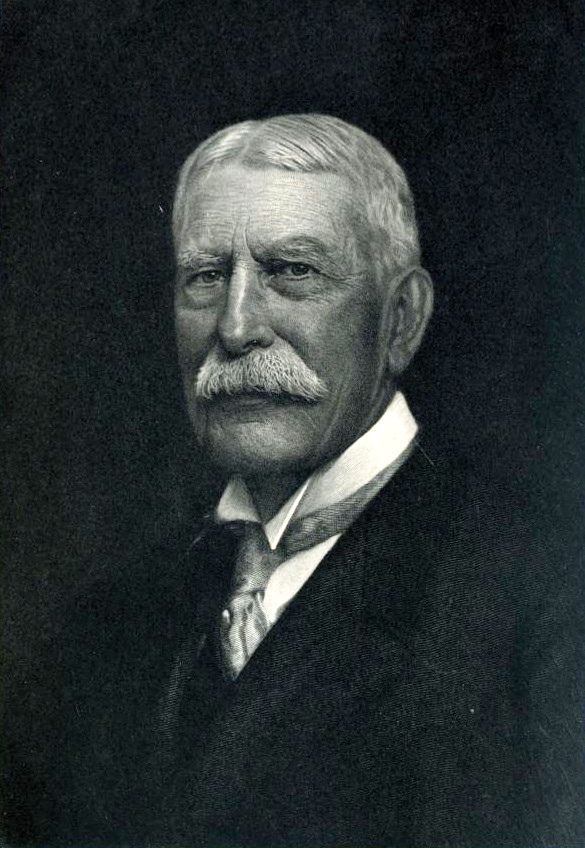
Henry Flagler, college namesake

Founded in 1968, the campus comprises 49 acres (200,000 m^{2}), the centerpiece of which is the Ponce de León Hotel, built in 1888 as a luxury hotel. The architects were John Carrere and Thomas Hastings, working for Henry Morrison Flagler, the industrialist, oil magnate and railroad pioneer. It is now listed as a National Historic Landmark.

Lawrence Lewis Jr., was the driving force behind Flagler's development. It was his vision to create a small, private liberal arts college on the old hotel grounds. Lewis was Chairman of Flagler's board of trustees for more than 20 years, guiding the college through a reorganization in 1971. He directed millions of dollars through foundations, family and personal funds into new construction, restoration projects, endowment and various other programs to ensure Flager's continued success. Lewis was related to Henry Flagler through his mother, Louise Wise Lewis Francis, who was the niece of Mary Lily Kenan Flagler, who married Henry Flagler in 1901 making him Lewis' great uncle.

In February 2014, the college's vice president of enrollment management, Marc Williar, resigned after it was determined that he had been altering student test scores, GPAs, and student rankings to enhance the college's image, standing, and reputation. The college hired a Jacksonville law firm to investigate. The report indicated that the college had been reporting false information since 2004 to various organizations, including the U.S. Department of Education and various ranking organizations.

== Proctor Library ==
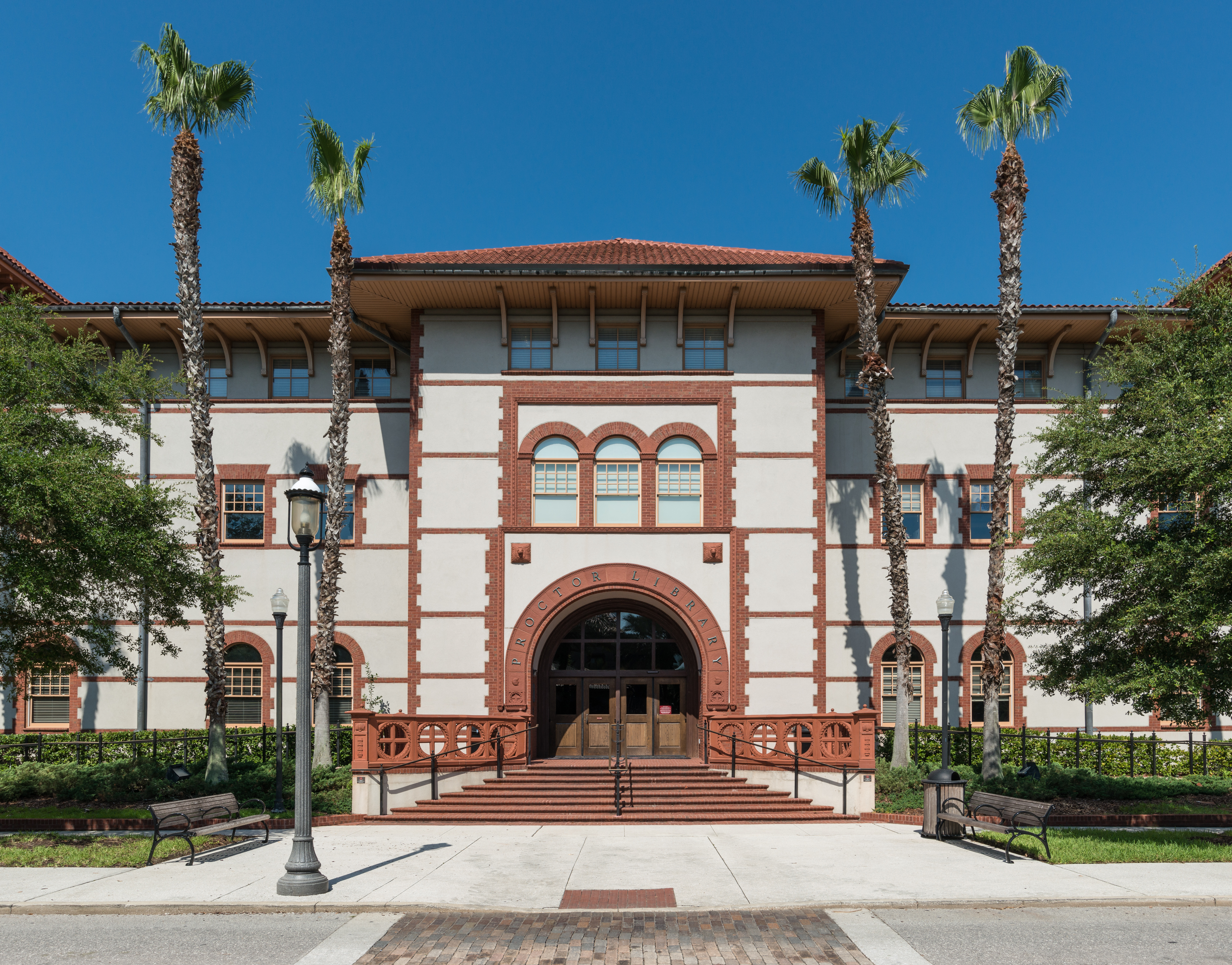
Proctor Library

The Proctor Library, located at 44 Sevilla Street in the northwest corner of campus, is Flagler's sole library facility. It is named after William L. Proctor, Flagler's chancellor, who was president of the college from 1971 until 2001. Like many of the historic buildings on campus, the Proctor Library's architectural design reflects the Gilded Age style popular during the time of Henry Flagler's construction of the Ponce de León Hotel in 1888. The Proctor Library was built in 1994-95, replacing the demolished home of artist Felix de Crano, which had been the last classic Shingle Style house in St. Augustine.

The library's collection contains approximately 102,047 printed volumes, 212,689 electronic books, 4,180 audiovisual items, 630 periodicals, and 5 newspapers, as well as almost 44,000 full-text electronic periodicals and 50 online databases. Proctor Library also contains three collections: Digital Collections, Flagler College Archives, and Special Collections. Access to, and the use of, the Proctor Library is limited to Flagler College students, faculty, and staff, and is not open to the general public without a written request. Proctor Library Digital Collections, however, is accessible to anyone with an Internet connection. St. Augustine Fiction is a collecting focus of the library in collaboration with the St. Augustine Historical Society.

== Academics ==
In the 2027 U.S. News & World Report Best Colleges rankings, Flagler College tied for first place among Regional Colleges in the South and ranked No. 1 among private regional colleges in the South. These were the first No. 1 rankings in the college's history.

Flagler College also received recognition in several additional categories:

- No. 1 (tied): Regional Colleges in the South
- No. 1 (tied): Top Private Regional Colleges in the South
- No. 16: Best Value Regional Colleges in the South
- Top Performer: Social Mobility, Regional Colleges in the South
- Nationally ranked: Undergraduate Psychology program

The college's Best Value ranking improved by two positions from the previous year, while its undergraduate Psychology program was included among nationally ranked programs for the first time.

In the 2024 rankings, Flagler College was ranked No. 2 for Most Innovative Schools, No. 3 among Regional Colleges in the South, No. 5 for Best Undergraduate Teaching, and No. 14 for Best Value Schools.

== Student life ==
=== Organizations ===
Flagler offers membership in fraternity, sororities, honor societies and almost 50 clubs and student organizations.

=== Newspaper ===
The Gargoyle is the college's student-run newspaper. In 2010, it went online-only. At the 2012 Society of Professional Journalists' Mark of Excellence Region 3 awards, The Gargoyle took first place for best independent online publication and first places for editor Michael Newberger in online opinion writing and sports editor Mari Pothier in online sports reporting.

Since becoming online-only, The Gargoyle has won nine Regional Mark of Excellence awards and published three more from Flagler Communication Department classes. Before 2010, the publication had only won two SPJ awards in its history. In 2007, the publication was a finalist in the Associated Collegiate Press Pacemaker Awards.

In 2006 and 2007, there were several allegations of censorship or alteration of articles in the Gargoyle by the college administration. In 2006, one issue of the newspaper was removed from circulation due to an alleged error in its headlines about rising tuition. In April 2007, the college administration again exercised editorial control over the paper due to alleged factual errors. Students rallied and organized a protest against any type of censorship of the newspaper, calling for a free and independent student press.

After September 2007, working on The Gargoyle was no longer required of communication majors. An advisory board and operating guidelines were set up for The Gargoyle.

== Athletics ==
The Flagler athletic teams are called the Saints. The college is a member of the NCAA Division II ranks, primarily competing in the Peach Belt Conference (PBC) since the 2009–10 academic year. The Saints previously competed as an NCAA D-II Independent from 2006–07 to 2008–09; and in the Florida Sun Conference (FSC; currently known as the Sun Conference since the 2008–09 school year) of the National Association of Intercollegiate Athletics (NAIA) from 1990–91 to 2005–06.

Flagler competes in 19 intercollegiate varsity sports: Men's sports include baseball, basketball, cross country, golf, lacrosse, soccer, tennis and track & field (indoor); while women's sports include basketball, cross country, golf, lacrosse, soccer, softball, tennis, track & field (indoor) and volleyball. There are also two spirit squad teams: cheerleading and pep band.

=== Volleyball ===
In 2009 the Flagler College Lady Saints volleyball team made it to the national championship, and finished in the top four of Division II volleyball teams in the nation. In 2010, the Lady Saints made it to the regional finals, finishing top 16 in the nation.

== Notable alumni ==
- Chris Barnwell, professional baseball player
- Kyle Bird, professional baseball player
- Blair Calvo, professional baseball player
- Laura Croft, model
- Linda Evans, science fiction writer
- Chris Holt, professional baseball coach
- Scott Lagasse Jr., NASCAR driver
- Greg Lake, Florida radio personality
- Robert Reyes, professional basketball player
- Marco Warren, Bermuda national football team
- Jacob Winchester, composer, writer, voice actor, and director
- Ariana Madix, reality television personality, actress and businesswoman.

== Gallery ==
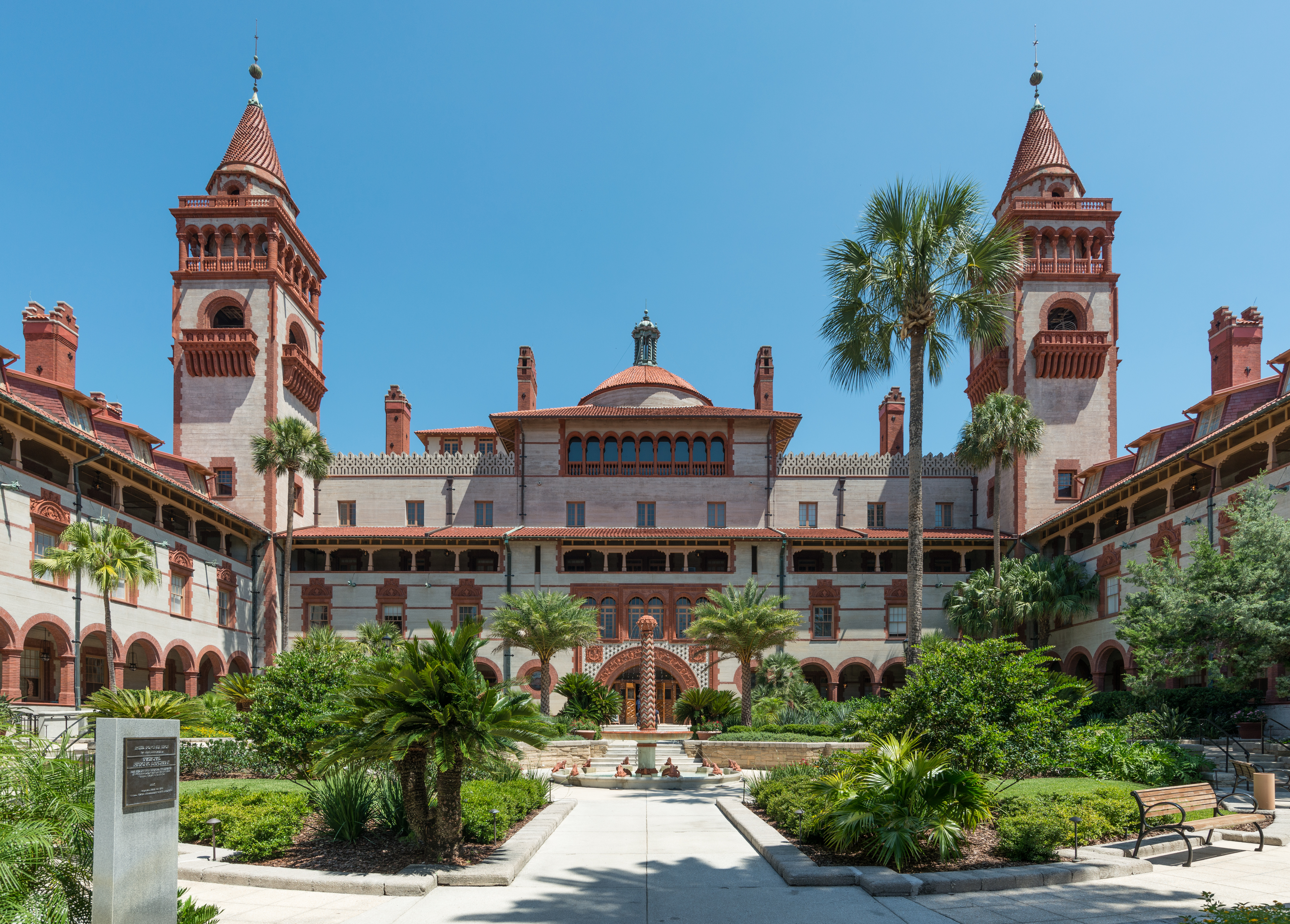
Courtyard of Ponce de León Hall

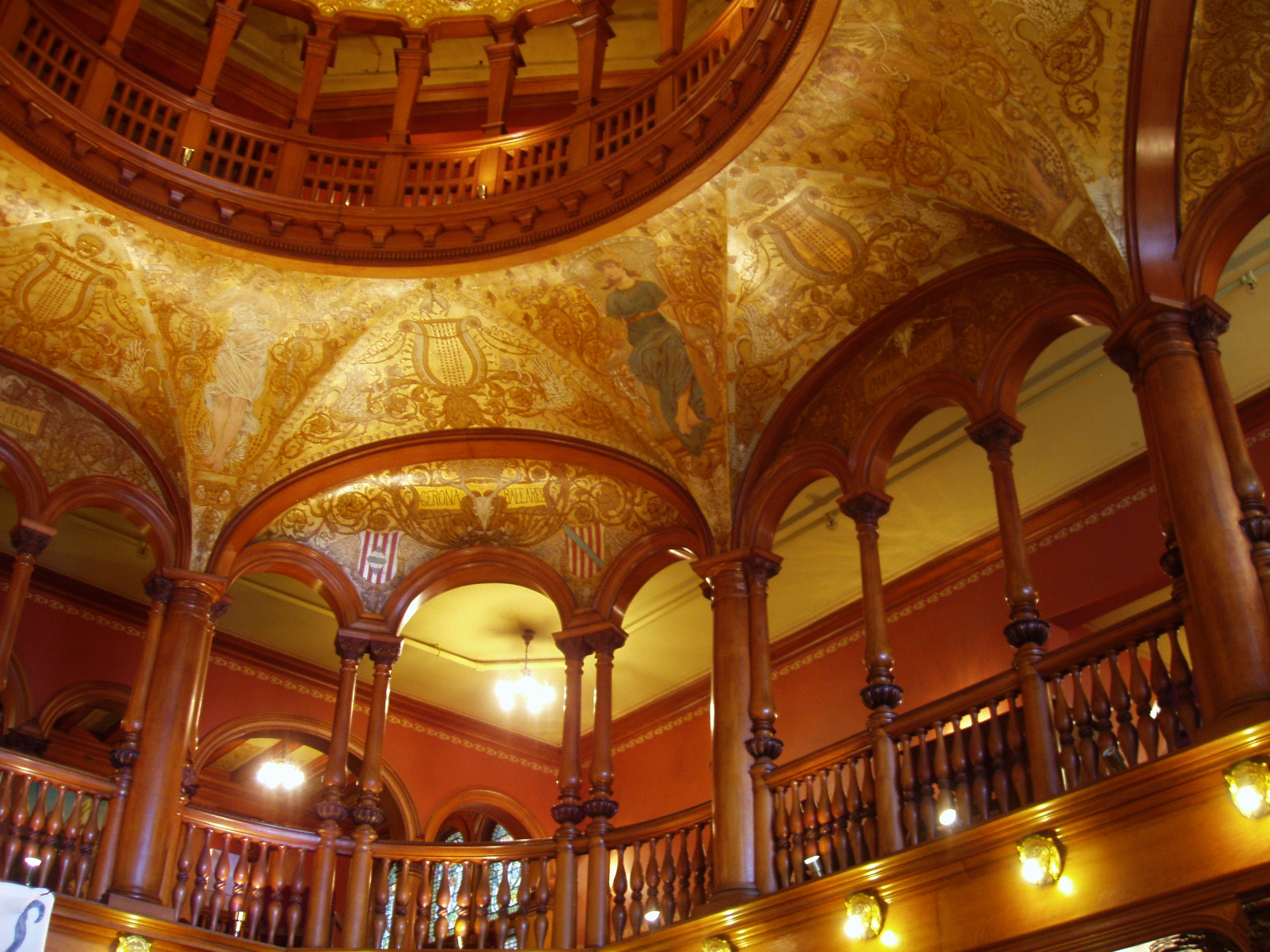
Lobby inside Flagler College.

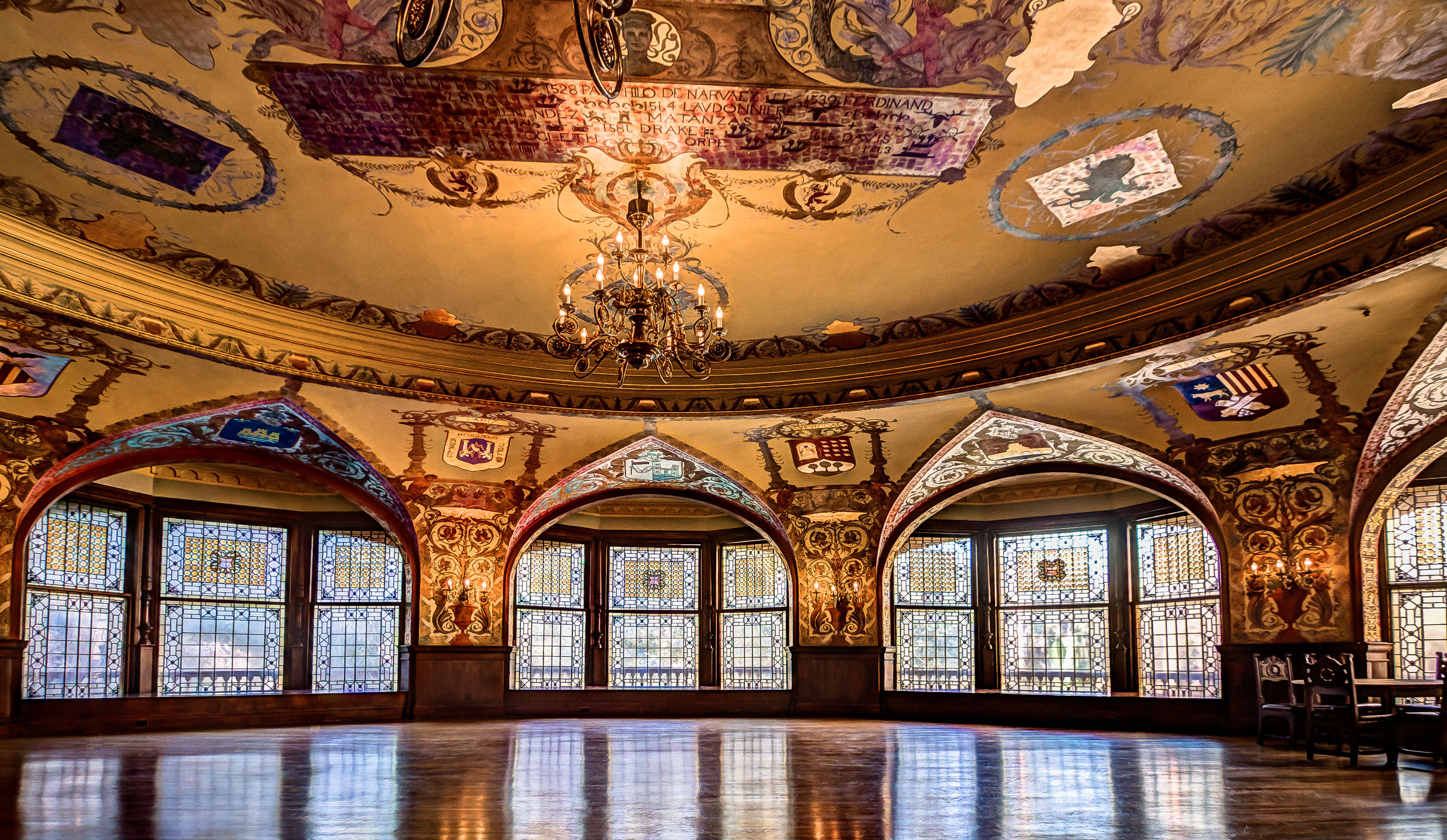
The Dining Hall with Louis Comfort Tiffany's stained glass windows.

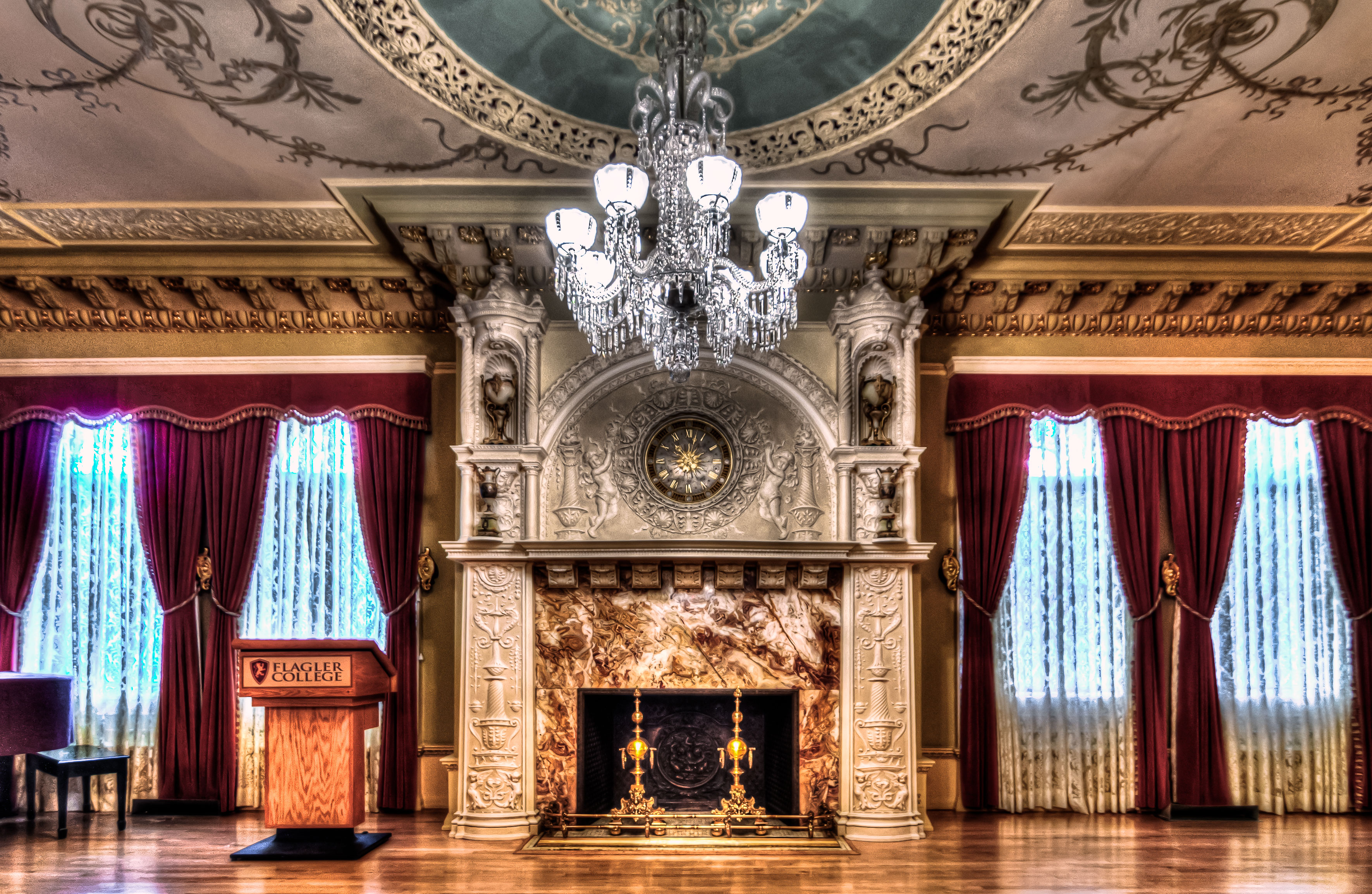
The Flagler Room, originally the hotel's Grand Parlor. One can see Tiffany Austrian crystal chandeliers and a massive onyx Thomas Edison clock (one of the first ever to be used in a public building).

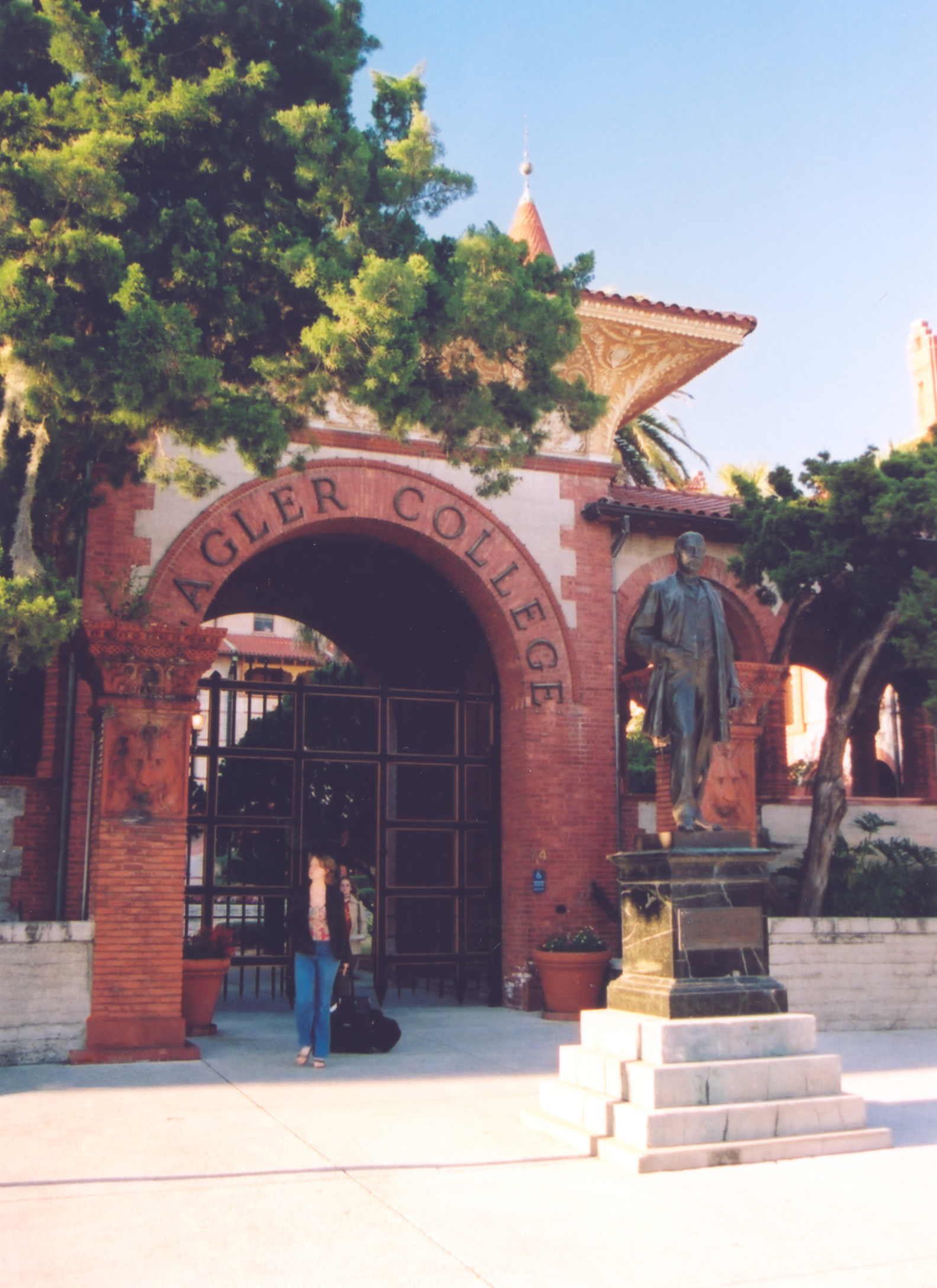
A statue of Henry Flagler stands guard at the King Street entry to the college.

== See also ==
- Flagler College – Tallahassee Campus
- Independent Colleges and Universities of Florida
