= David Troxler =

American politician

Member of the Florida House of Representatives from the 20th district
- In office 1986–1990
- Preceded by: Thomas L. Hazouri
- Succeeded by: Kathy G. Chinoy

Personal details
- Born: March 10, 1952 (age 74) Jacksonville, Florida, U.S.
- Party: Republican
- Education: Florida Junior College; University of North Florida

David W. Troxler (born March 10, 1952) is an American politician. He served as a Republican member for the 20th district of the Florida House of Representatives.

== Life and career ==
Troxler was born in Jacksonville, Florida. He attended Florida Junior College and the University of North Florida.

In 1986, Troxler was elected to represent the 20th district of the Florida House of Representatives, succeeding Thomas L. Hazouri. He served until 1990, when he was succeeded by Kathy G. Chinoy.
