= Kathy Chinoy =

American politician

Kathy G. Chinoy

Member of the Florida House of Representatives from the 20th district
- In office 1990–1992
- Preceded by: David Troxler
- Succeeded by: Tracy Upchurch

Personal details
- Party: Democratic

Kathy Geller Chinoy is an American politician and lawyer from Jacksonville, Florida.

== Political career ==
Chinoy's political career started in 1990 when she ran against incumbent David Troxler for a spot in the Florida House of Representatives. She won the election by only 1.6%.

Many in Tallahassee thought Chinoy was a rising star in the house and her reelection in 1992 was secure. However, a Republican mail out campaign helped her opponent James B. Fuller pull ahead, and win the race.

In 1994 she would challenge Fuller again in the 16th district but she would fall short and lose.

== Electoral history ==
General election for Florida House of Representatives District 16, 1994
Party	Candidate	Votes	%
Republican	James B. Fuller	18,393	54.7%
Democratic	Kathy G. Chinoy	15,206	45.3%

General Election for Florida House of Representatives District 16, 1992
Party	Candidate	Votes	%
Republican	James B. Fuller	22,273	53.3%
Republican	Kathy G. Chinoy	19,499	46.7%

General Election for Florida House of Representatives District 20, 1990
Party	Candidate	Votes	%
Democratic	Kathy G. Chinoy	17,174	50.8%
Republican	David Troxer	16,654	49.2%
