= Greg Lake (radio personality) =

American radio personality

- Born: Gregory Alan Whaley; 1960 (age 65–66)
- Education: Flagler College
- Occupation: Radio personality

Greg Lake (born 1960 as Gregory Alan Whaley) has been a Florida radio personality for nearly 20 years.

== Early life and career ==
He was born in the Northern Virginia suburbs of Washington, D.C. and moved to Florida in the late 1970s to attend Flagler College in St. Augustine, where he met and married his wife, Kathy.

Moving to South Florida, he launched his radio career at WKGR 98.7 (Ft. Pierce, Florida) where he stayed until the station was sold. He then followed the entire on-air staff to then WAKS-FM 103.7 (Fort Myers, Florida) where they stayed until it too was eventually sold. The on-air staff returned to the east coast of Florida to take over WZZR 92.7 (Port St. Lucie, Florida) where he continued his program The Dead Zone until the end of 1994 when he took over the morning drive show. He remained there until the spring of 1996 when he was let go for sagging ratings. Lake then moved to Daytona Beach and started his own advertising agency (Alternative Advertising). After four years in the advertising business, he became production director post at WELE 1380, Ormond Beach.

After a year, as production director he was promoted to the program director position. In 2000, Lake launched and hosted a politically driven, morning call-in talk show called Radio Free Volusia which aired online and locally on WELE five days a week, until his final show on April 25, 2008.

During the eight years of daily shows, Lake interviewed hundred. Lake was also a source for breaking news stories. Many of those stories were in the wake of the September 11th 2001 terrorist attacks.
