= Doug Wiles =

American politician

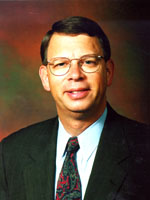

Member of the Florida House of Representatives from the 20th district
- In office November 19, 1996 – November 16, 2004
- Preceded by: Tracy Upchurch
- Succeeded by: Bill Proctor

Personal details
- Born: November 7, 1952 (age 73)
- Party: Democratic
- Spouse: Doris Wiles
- Education: St. Johns River Community College (AA); University of Florida (BS)
- Profession: Insurance Executive

Doug Wiles is a resident of St. Augustine, Florida where he is the CEO of Herbie Wiles Insurance.

Wiles previously served as a Representative in the Florida House of Representatives from 1996–2004, serving as the Democratic Leader from 2002-2004.

Wiles received his Bachelor's degree from the University of Florida in journalism. He is also a retired Lt. Colonel, serving nearly 25 years in the United States Army and the Florida National Guard, which included a short stint in Saudi Arabia during Operation Desert Shield.

He and his wife, Doris, have two daughters, Lindsay and Ashley and six grandchildren.
