= Moongate (book) =

1982 conspiracy theory book by William L. Brian II

Moongate: Suppressed Findings of the U.S. Space Program, The NASA-Military Cover-Up
- Author: William L. Brian II
- Language: English
- Genre: Conspiracy Theory
- Publication date: 1982
- Publication place: United States
- ISBN: 978-0-941-29200-9

Moongate: Suppressed Findings of the U.S. Space Program, The NASA-Military Cover-Up is a 1982 book by American engineer William L. Brian II.

Jonathan Eisen wrote in his 1999 book Suppressed Inventions that Brian asserts in Moongate that the Moon has a weighty atmosphere and gravity, so "a top secret antigravity propulsion system" was required to land on and take off from the Moon.

The book alleges a cover-up by NASA for hiding facts about the Moon's having alien intelligence. Brian asserts that in the 1960s, NASA discovered that the Moon's gravitational field was 64 percent as powerful as the Earth's. He said this is significant because it would mean Newton's law of universal gravitation is incorrect. It would also indicate that the Moon could maintain an atmosphere, allowing for life to exist.

== Reviews ==
Roger D. Launius and J. D. Hunley of NASA called the book "a sensationalistic exposé". They cited the title of Chapter 10, "Evidence of Extraterrestrial Interference in the Space Program", as suggesting "the highly speculative and tenuous tenor of the book".

Jonathan Vankin and John Whalen wrote in their 2004 book The 80 Greatest Conspiracies of All Time that the book "sketched out a ... planet-shaking, NASA-scamming history of the solar system" and that "Brian's theories echo another wing of aerospace conspiracy conjecture, the insanely sweeping 'Alternative 3' plot".

== See also ==
- Conspiracy theories
- Lost Cosmonauts
- Moon landing conspiracy theories
