= Gus Craig =

American politician (1920–2008)

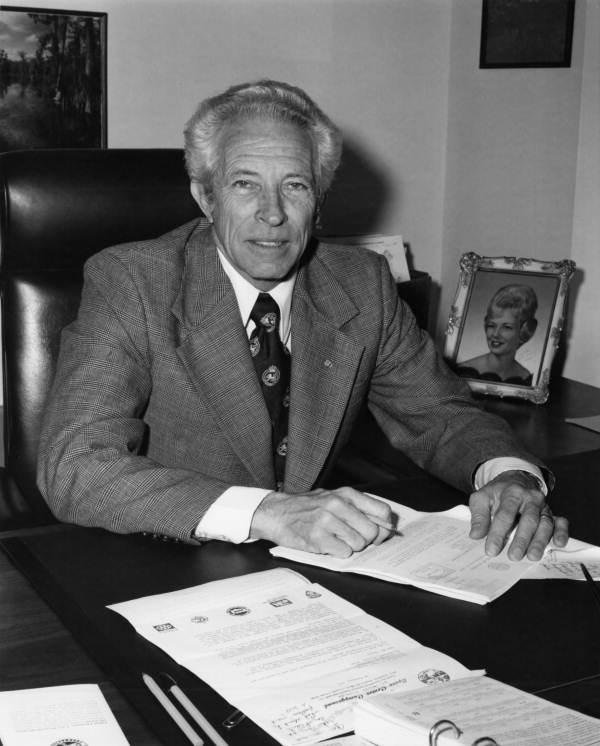
- Craig in 1970

Member of the Florida House of Representatives
- In office 1959–1980

Personal details
- Born: January 25, 1920 St. Augustine, Florida, U.S.
- Died: October 18, 2008 (aged 88) St. Augustine, Florida, U.S.
- Party: Democratic
- Spouse: Margie Craig
- Children: 2
- Education: University of Florida; Cincinnati College of Mortuary Science

Gus Craig (January 25, 1920 – October 18, 2008) was an American politician. He served as a Democratic member of the Florida House of Representatives from 1959 to 1980.

== Life and career ==
Craig was born in St. Augustine, Florida, the son of Willie Mae and Augustus Hendrick Craig. He attended Ketterlinus High School, the University of Florida and Cincinnati College of Mortuary Science.

Craig served in the United States Navy. In 1959, he was elected to the Florida House of Representatives. Craig was president pro tempore for two years. He left office in 1980.

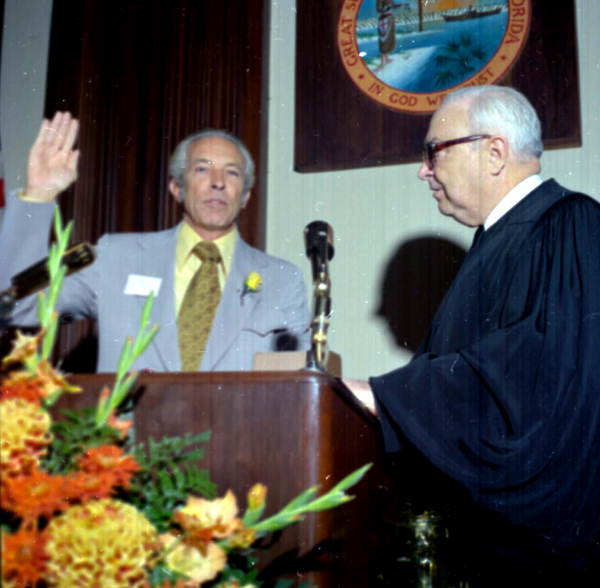
Craig (left) with B. K. Roberts in the 1970s

Craig died in October 2008 at his home in St. Augustine, Florida, at the age of 88.
