= J. Edwin Baker =

American politician (1899–1963)

J. Ed Baker
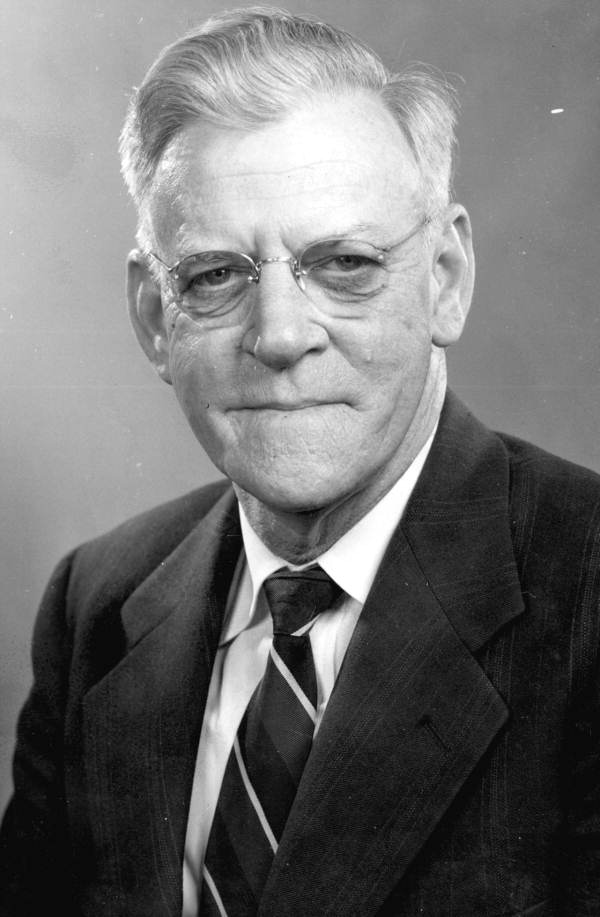

Member of the Florida Senate
- In office 1943, 1949–1955

Personal details
- Born: July 18, 1899 Plant City, Florida, U.S.
- Died: March 6, 1963 (aged 63) Lake County, Florida, U.S.
- Resting place: Lakeside Memory Gardens, Eustis, Florida
- Party: Democratic
- Children: 2
- Occupation: Realtor and former newspaperman

John Edwin Baker (July 18, 1899 – March 6, 1963) was an American politician in the state of Florida and a Democrat.

Baker was born in Plant City, Florida, the son of George Bell and Julia P. (McLendon) Baker. He was educated in Palm Beach County, Florida, and was a businessman, realtor, and general manager of the Palm Beach Times newspaper. Baker also served in World War I with the United States Navy. He was married and has two children. He served in the Florida State Senate from 1949 to 1955 and also briefly in 1943, for the 23rd district. He was a member of the Pork Chop Gang, a group of legislators from rural areas that dominated the state legislature due to malapportionment and used their power to engage in McCarthyist tactics.
