= Gary R. Cunningham =

American politician

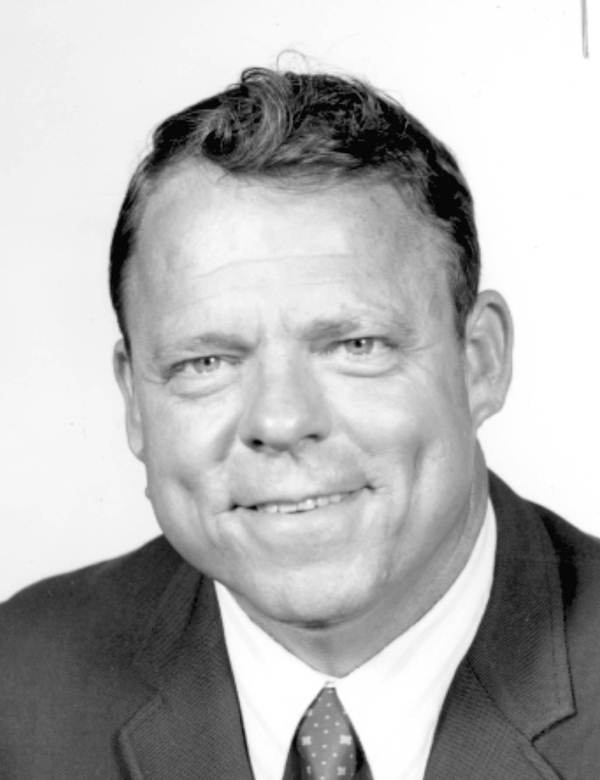
- Cunningham in 1972

Member of the Florida House of Representatives from the 30th district
- In office 1972–1974
- Preceded by: Buddy MacKay
- Succeeded by: Sam Bell

Personal details
- Born: 1932/1933 Daytona Beach, Florida, U.S.
- Died: January 14, 2008 (aged 76)
- Party: Democratic

Gary R. Cunningham (1932/1933 – January 14, 2008) was an American politician. He served as a Democratic member for the 30th district of the Florida House of Representatives.

== Life and career ==
Cunningham was born in Daytona Beach, Florida.

In 1972, Cunningham was elected to represent the 30th district of the Florida House of Representatives, succeeding Buddy MacKay. He served until 1974, when he was succeeded by Sam Bell.

Cunningham died on January 14, 2008, at the age of 76.
