= Millard Caldwell =

American judge and politician (1897–1984)

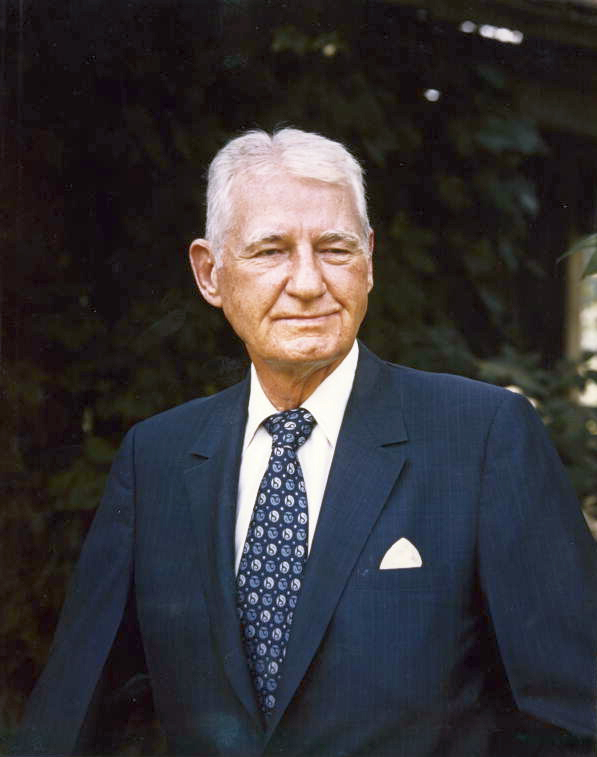

Chief Justice of the Florida Supreme Court
- In office September 5, 1967 – January 7, 1969
- Preceded by: Stephen C. O'Connell
- Succeeded by: Richard Ervin

Justice of the Florida Supreme Court
- In office February 14, 1962 – January 7, 1969
- Appointed by: C. Farris Bryant
- Preceded by: T. Frank Hobson
- Succeeded by: James C. Adkins

Administrator of the Federal Civil Defense Administration
- In office December 1, 1950 – November 15, 1952
- President: Harry S. Truman
- Preceded by: William N. Haskell (Office of Civilian Defense, 1945)
- Succeeded by: James Jeremiah Wadsworth (acting)

Chair of the National Governors Association
- In office May 26, 1946 – July 13, 1947
- Preceded by: Ed Martin
- Succeeded by: Horace Hildreth

29th Governor of Florida
- In office January 2, 1945 – January 4, 1949
- Preceded by: Spessard Holland
- Succeeded by: Fuller Warren

Member of the U.S. House of Representatives from Florida's 3rd district
- In office March 4, 1933 – January 3, 1941
- Preceded by: Tom Yon
- Succeeded by: Bob Sikes

Member of the Florida House of Representatives
- In office 1930–1932

Personal details
- Born: Millard Fillmore Caldwell; February 6, 1897 Beverly, Tennessee, U.S. (now Knoxville)
- Died: October 23, 1984 (aged 87) Tallahassee, Florida, U.S.
- Party: Democratic
- Spouse: Mary Harwood (m. 1925)
- Children: 3
- Education: Carson-Newman University (attended); University of Mississippi (attended); University of Virginia (attended)

Military service
- Allegiance: United States
- Branch/service: United States Army
- Years of service: 1918–1919
- Rank: First Lieutenant
- Battles/wars: World War I

Millard Fillmore Caldwell (February 6, 1897 – October 23, 1984) was an American conservative politician, lawyer, and jurist. He was the 29th governor of Florida (1945–1949) and served in all three branches of government at various times in his life, including as a U.S. representative and Florida Supreme Court justice. His appointment in 1950 by President Truman as the first head of the Federal Civil Defense Administration (FCDA) was protested, because he was a vocal segregationist that wanted to develop "white only" bomb shelters.

== Early life ==
Caldwell was born in the rural area of Beverly, Tennessee, outside Knoxville. There he attended public schools and attended Carson-Newman College, the University of Mississippi, and the University of Virginia. During World War I, Caldwell enlisted in the U.S. Army on April 3, 1918. He was commissioned as a second lieutenant in the Field Artillery, and was discharged on January 11, 1919. Caldwell moved to Milton, Florida in 1924, practicing law there.

== Career ==
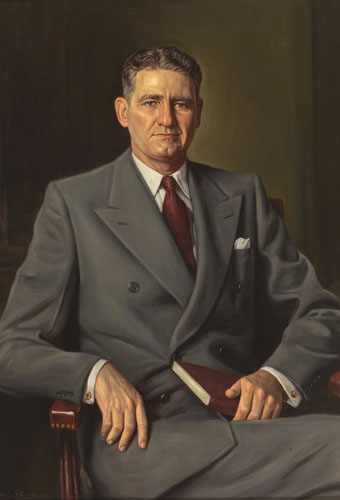
Portrait of Caldwell

=== Early career ===
In 1926, Caldwell began serving as prosecutor and county attorney of Santa Rosa County; in 1929, he was elected as a Democrat to the state House, where he was a member until 1932.

=== US Congress and gubernatorial interim ===
Caldwell would enter the 1932 Democratic primary late for Florida's 3rd Congressional District. In the end he would end up defeating Tom Yon and in congress he would serve as a member on two committees: Foreign Affairs and Appropriations. While serving in Congress he would urge that the US be self-sufficient for its war resources by 1934. He would unsuccessfully try to place an embargo on shipments to Japan and he did advocate for expanding both the Navy and Army. He would retire from Congress on January 1, 1941, and move to Tallahassee where he would practice law along with operate a dairy and raise cattle.

=== Governorship ===
In 1944, Caldwell was elected governor of Florida. Taking office in 1945, Caldwell's term is noted for his segregationist beliefs. He was said to be anti-black, anti-Catholic, anti-Semitic, and anti-immigration and supported federal policies that targeted minorities. He refused to address NAACP leaders by their professional titles. He accepted lynching and restricted blacks from voting in the primaries.

He is also known for his support for road construction projects and the establishment of the Educational Minimum Foundation Program, which gave education funds to rural counties. One of the more colorful aspects of Caldwell's term came on August 10, 1945, during the surrender of Japan in World War II, when Caldwell issued a proclamation urging bars and other alcohol-selling establishments to close in order to prevent a frenzy of drunken celebration in the streets.

Caldwell would support Harry S. Truman's run for president in 1948 as many Southern Democrats had left the party.

=== Post-governorship activities ===
After leaving office in 1949, Caldwell was appointed the administrator of the Federal Civil Defense Administration by then-President Harry S. Truman in 1950. After leaving this post in 1952, Caldwell served as a justice – and later chief justice – on the State Supreme Court from 1962 to 1969.

On May 14, 1953, Caldwell was initiated as an honorary brother in the Alpha Phi chapter of Alpha Kappa Psi at the University of Florida

== Death ==
Caldwell died in Tallahassee on October 23, 1984. He is interred at Blackwood-Harwood Plantations Cemetery in Leon County in Tallahassee, Florida.

== Personal life ==
Caldwell was married to Mary Harwood Caldwell; the couple's three children were Susan, Millard, and Sally.

During his life, Caldwell was a member of the Newcomen Society, Freemasons, Shriners, Elks, and Knights of Pythias. He was also a member of Kappa Sigma and Phi Alpha Delta.

== See also ==
- List of governors of Florida

U.S. House of Representatives
Preceded by Tom Yon	Member of the U.S. House of Representatives from Florida's 3rd congressional district 1933–1941	Succeeded by Bob Sikes
Party political offices
Preceded by Spessard Holland	Democratic nominee for Governor of Florida; 1944	Succeeded by Fuller Warren
Political offices
Preceded by Spessard Holland	Governor of Florida; 1945–1949	Succeeded by Fuller Warren
Preceded by Ed Martin	Chair of the National Governors Association; 1946–1947	Succeeded by Horace Hildreth
Vacant Title last held by William N. Haskell; 1945 as Director of the Office of Civilian Defense	Administrator of the Federal Civil Defense Administration; 1950–1952	Succeeded by James Jeremiah Wadsworth; Acting
