= Calhoun County School District (Florida) =

School district in Florida, United States

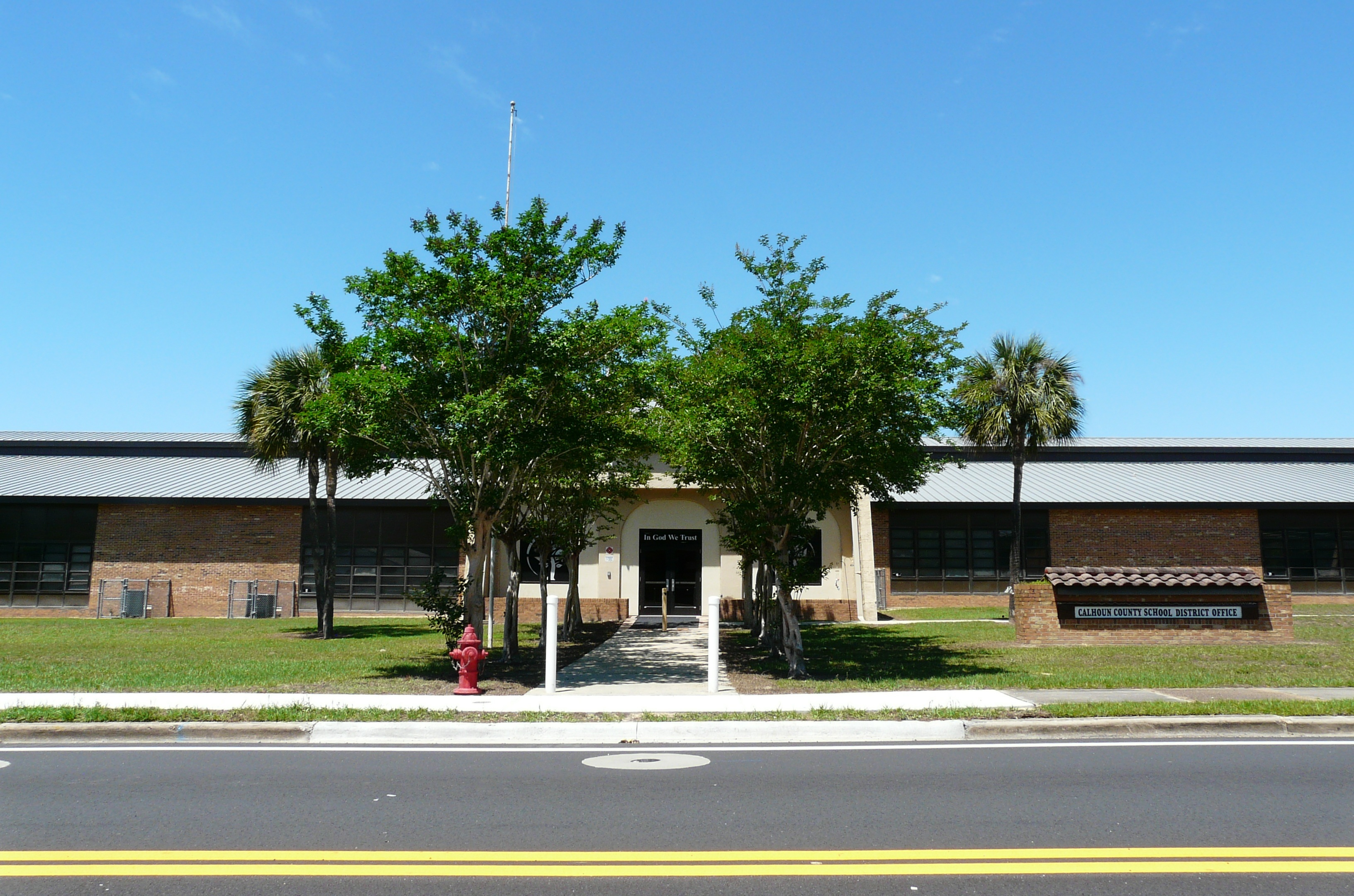
- Office in Blountstown, Florida

Address
- 20859 Central Avenue East Blountstown, Florida, 32424; United States

District information
- Type: Public
- Grades: PreK–12
- NCES District ID: 1200210

Students and staff
- Students: 2,062
- Teachers: 115.95
- Staff: 160.37
- Student–teacher ratio: 17.78

Other information
- Website: www.calhounflschools.org

Calhoun County School District is a school district headquartered in Blountstown, Florida. It serves Calhoun County.

== Schools ==
K-12:

- Altha Public School

High school:

- Blountstown High School

K-8 schools:

- Carr Elementary & Middle School

Middle schools:

- Blountstown Middle School

Elementary schools:

- Blountstown Elementary School
