= Orange, Georgia =

Unincorporated community in Georgia, U.S.

Coordinates: 34°15′20″N 84°20′29″W

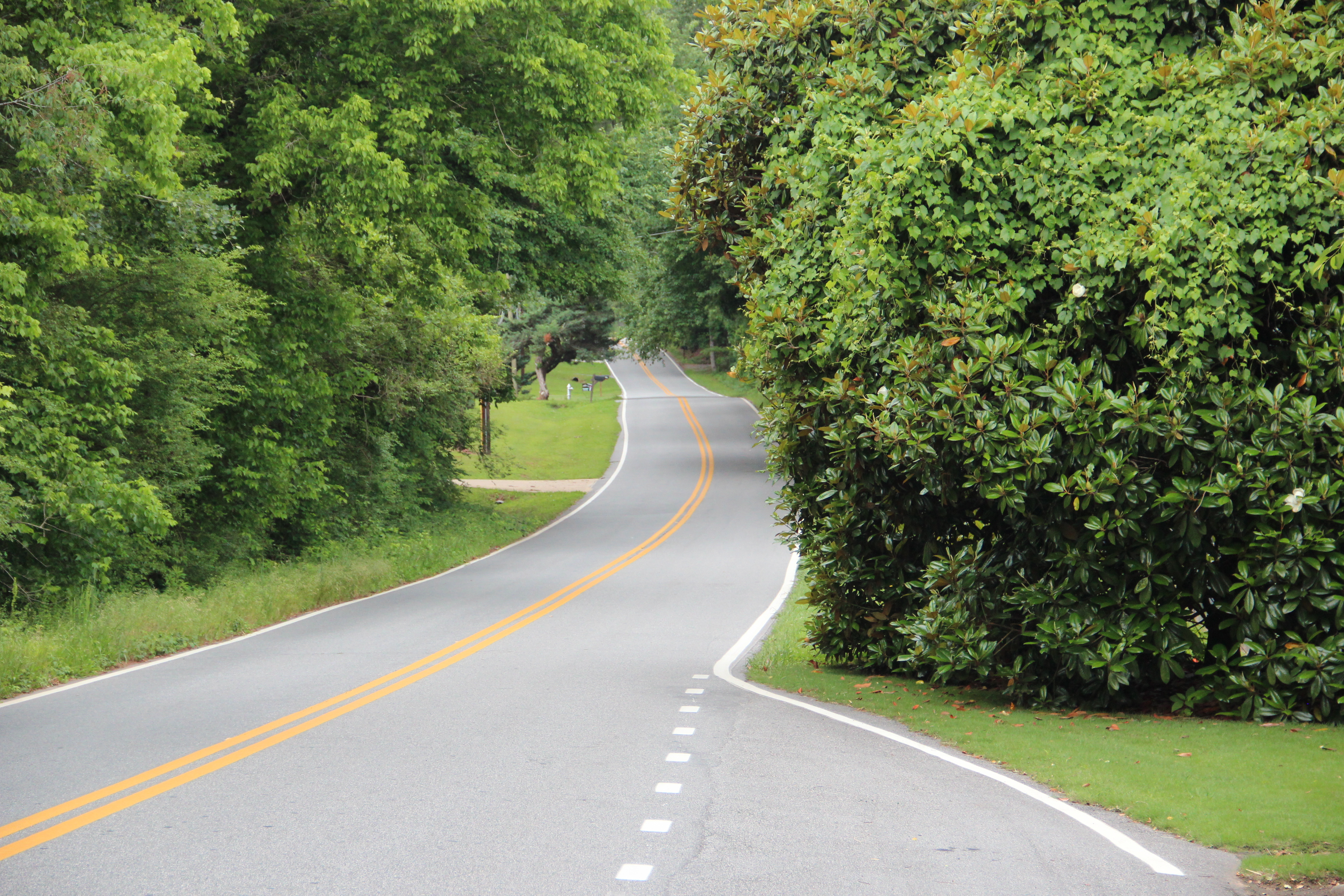
Old Orange Mill Road

Orange is an unincorporated community located in eastern Cherokee County between the communities of Macedonia and Lathemtown in the U.S. state of Georgia. Orange was the second community in Cherokee County upon the county's inception in 1832. This community was at its height during the later portion of the 18th century due to its location on the main highway into Forsyth County. It had a post office, a general store, and Orange United Methodist, one of the first churches in Cherokee.
