= Blountstown, Florida =

- City
- City of Blountstown
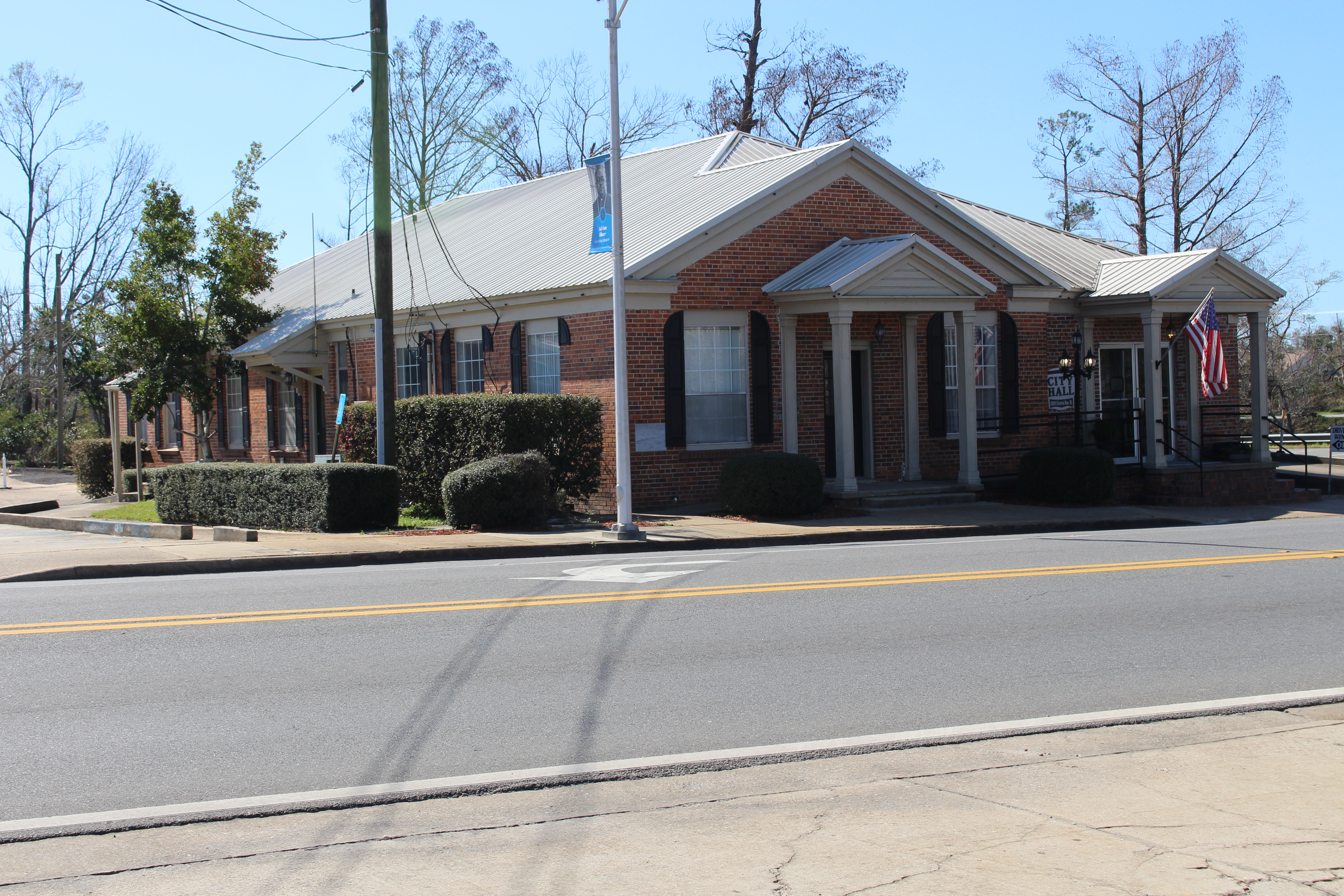
- Blountstown City Hall
- Motto: "A River Town"
- Location in Calhoun County and the state of Florida
- Coordinates: 30°26′35″N 85°02′44″W
- Country: United States
- State: Florida
- County: Calhoun
- Settled: c. 1820
- Incorporated: 1903

Government
  - Type: Council-Manager
  - Mayor: Tony Shoemake
  - Councilors: Martha "Mert" Stephens, William "Bill" Gaskin, Clifford Jackson, and Sheila Blackburn
  - City Manager: Traci S. Hall
  - City Attorney: Jeff Carter

Area
  - Total: 3.20 sq mi (8.28 km^{2})
  - Land: 3.19 sq mi (8.25 km^{2})
  - Water: 0.012 sq mi (0.03 km^{2})
- Elevation: 66 ft (20 m)

Population (2020)
  - Total: 2,266
  - Density: 711/sq mi (274.5/km^{2})
- Time zone: UTC-6 (Central (CST))
  - Summer (DST): UTC-5 (CDT)
- ZIP code: 32424
- Area code(s): 850, 448
- FIPS code: 12-06925
- GNIS feature ID: 2403881
- Website: blountstownfl.govoffice3.com

Blountstown is a city and the county seat of Calhoun County, Florida, United States. As of the 2020 census, the city had a population of 2,266.

== Name ==
Blountstown is named for John Blount, a Creek Indian chief who served as a guide for General Andrew Jackson during his incursion of Spanish Florida in 1818 during the First Seminole War. This invasion was not directed at Spain, per se, but at refuge Red Stick Creeks, and allied Seminole, Yuchi, Miccosukee, and Choctaw who had fled to north Florida following the Creek War. Also, a large contingent of Maroons and former Corps of Colonial Marines from the War of 1812 had remained in and around Prospect Bluff, known during that time as the Negro Fort.

Jackson's invasion caused Spain to sell Florida to the United States, since it was apparent that the Spanish Empire could not defend the colony from American invasion. Thus, the Spanish Florida colony became a U.S. Territory in 1821.

== History ==
Blountstown was originally named for a Native American Chief (John Blount), who had been awarded land in the vicinity by Andrew Jackson for aiding Jackson in his battles against the Native Americans and allied runaway slaves living along the Apalachicola River. However, he was forced to move from Florida to Texas in the 1830s under the terms of the Indian Removal Act. He died soon after being relocated. However, the current city started to be permanently settled by American settlers in the 1820s, soon after Florida became a U.S. Territory.

In the late 1850s, there was an open and violent feud between two rival factions which included the local Durden family. At one point, the Durdens and their rivals had a "pitched battle" at the courthouse square in Blountstown.

In 1903, the City of Blountstown was officially incorporated as a municipality.

On October 10, 2018, Blountstown was nearly annihilated when Category 5 Hurricane Michael struck the town. The city was without power for almost three weeks and over 80% of homes and businesses were heavily damaged or destroyed. Blountstown High School suffered heavy damage, but Blountstown Elementary School was completely destroyed. In addition, the local timber and farming industries, which are Calhoun County's largest industries, were completely destroyed, costing millions of dollars in economic loss.

== Geography ==
The City of Blountstown is located in east central Calhoun County. Directly to the east lies Bristol in Liberty County. Blountstown and Calhoun County uses the Central Time Zone, as opposed to Liberty County which is in the Eastern Time Zone.

According to the United States Census Bureau, the city has a total area of 3.2 square miles (8.3 km^{2}), of which 3.2 square miles (8.3 km^{2}) is land and 0.31% is water.

=== Climate ===
The climate in this area is characterized by hot, humid summers and generally mild winters. According to the Köppen climate classification, the City of Blountstown has a humid subtropical climate zone (Cfa).

== Demographics ==
Historical population
Census	Pop.	Note	%±
1910	546		—
1920	863		58.1%
1930	1,270		47.2%
1940	1,931		52.0%
1950	2,118		9.7%
1960	2,375		12.1%
1970	2,384		0.4%
1980	2,632		10.4%
1990	2,404		−8.7%
2000	2,444		1.7%
2010	2,514		2.9%
2020	2,266		−9.9%
U.S. Decennial Census

=== Racial and ethnic composition ===
Blountstown racial composition (Hispanics excluded from racial categories) (NH = Non-Hispanic)
Race	Pop 2010	Pop 2020	% 2010	% 2020
White (NH)	1,667	1,439	66.31%	63.50%
Black or African American (NH)	698	539	27.76%	23.79%
Native American or Alaska Native (NH)	21	16	0.84%	0.71%
Asian (NH)	10	9	0.40%	0.40%
Pacific Islander or Native Hawaiian (NH)	2	0	0.08%	0.00%
Some other race (NH)	0	0	0.00%	0.00%
Two or more races/Multiracial (NH)	46	153	1.83%	6.75%
Hispanic or Latino (any race)	70	110	2.78%	4.85%
Total	2,514	2,266	100.00%	100.00%

=== 2020 census ===
As of the 2020 census, Blountstown had a population of 2,266. The median age was 46.6 years. 22.6% of residents were under the age of 18 and 27.7% were 65 years of age or older. For every 100 females there were 87.1 males, and for every 100 females age 18 and over there were 82.2 males age 18 and over.

0.0% of residents lived in urban areas, while 100.0% lived in rural areas.

There were 848 households in Blountstown, of which 33.7% had children under the age of 18 living in them. Of all households, 33.6% were married-couple households, 20.6% were households with a male householder and no spouse or partner present, and 40.7% were households with a female householder and no spouse or partner present. About 36.3% of all households were made up of individuals, and 19.3% had someone living alone who was 65 years of age or older.

There were 986 housing units, of which 14.0% were vacant. The homeowner vacancy rate was 4.7% and the rental vacancy rate was 8.5%.

In 2020, there was a 47.0% employment rate and a median household income of $37,083. 28.6% of the population lived below the poverty threshold.

According to the 2020 American Community Survey 5-Year estimates, there were 647 families residing in the city.

=== 2010 census ===
As of the 2010 United States census, there were 2,514 people, 968 households, and 610 families residing in the city.

=== 2000 census ===
As of the census of 2000, there were 2,444 people, 913 households, and 595 families residing in the city. The population density was 767.2 inhabitants per square mile (296.2/km^{2}). There were 1,046 housing units at an average density of 328.4 units per square mile (126.8 units/km^{2}). The racial makeup of the city was 65.18% White, 31.79% African American, 1.27% Native American, 0.33% Asian, 0.08% Pacific Islander, 0.29% from other races, and 1.06% from two or more races. Hispanic or Latino of any race were 0.70% of the population.

In 2000, there were 913 households, out of which 27.4% had children under the age of 18 living with them, 40.6% were married couples living together, 21.6% had a female householder with no husband present, and 34.8% were non-families. 31.8% of all households were made up of individuals, and 17.9% had someone living alone who was 65 years of age or older. The average household size was 2.39 and the average family size was 2.99.

In 2000, in the city, the population was spread out, with 23.2% under the age of 18, 8.1% from 18 to 24, 22.1% from 25 to 44, 21.3% from 45 to 64, and 25.3% who were 65 years of age or older. The median age was 42 years. For every 100 females, there were 75.7 males. For every 100 females age 18 and over, there were 71.8 males.

In 2000, the median income for a household in the city was $23,271, and the median income for a family was $30,880. Males had a median income of $23,313 versus $20,000 for females. The per capita income for the city was $11,498. About 18.5% of families and 24.3% of the population were below the poverty line, including 33.6% of those under age 18 and 17.7% of those age 65 or over.

== Government ==
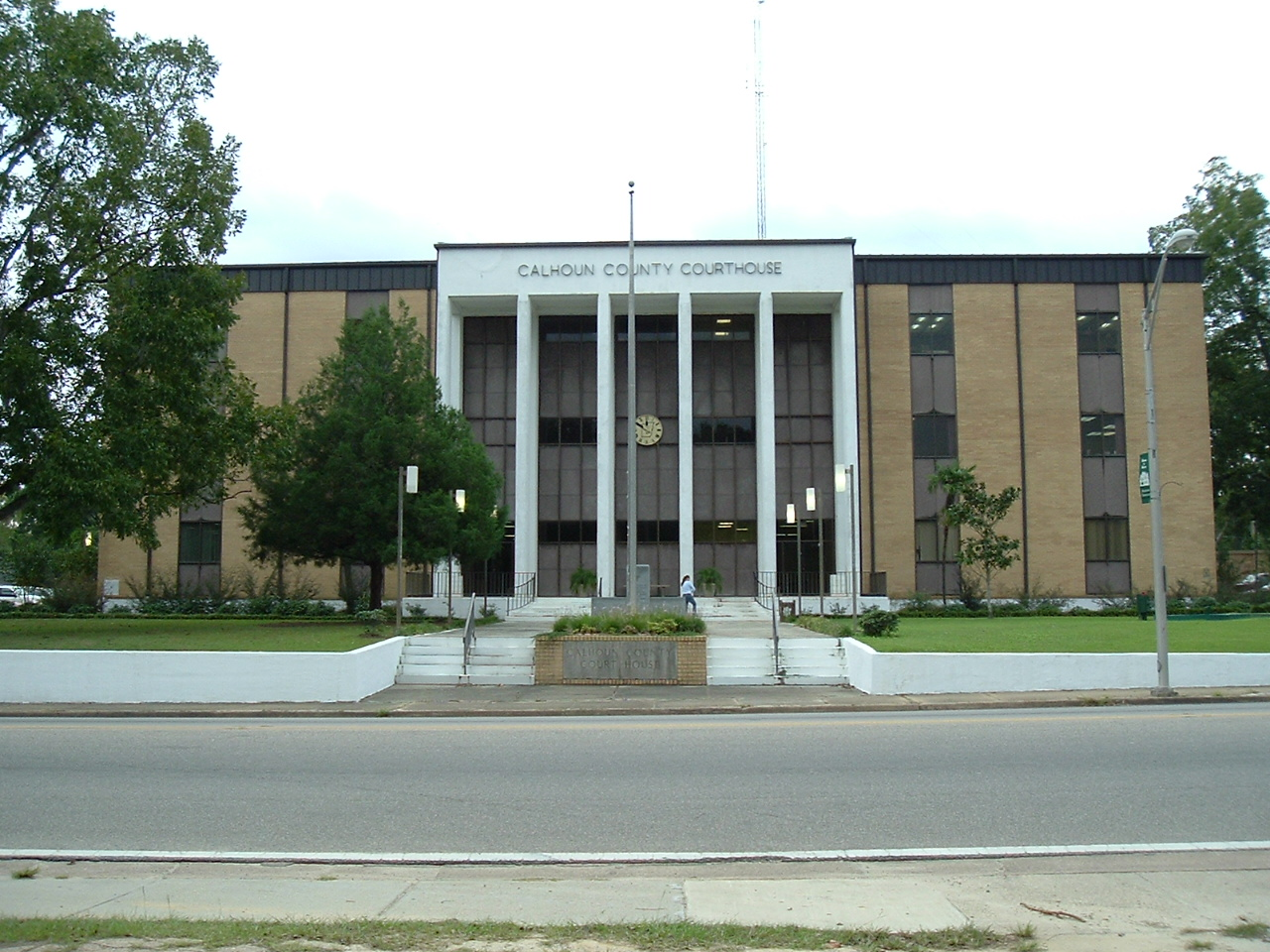
Modern Calhoun County Courthouse

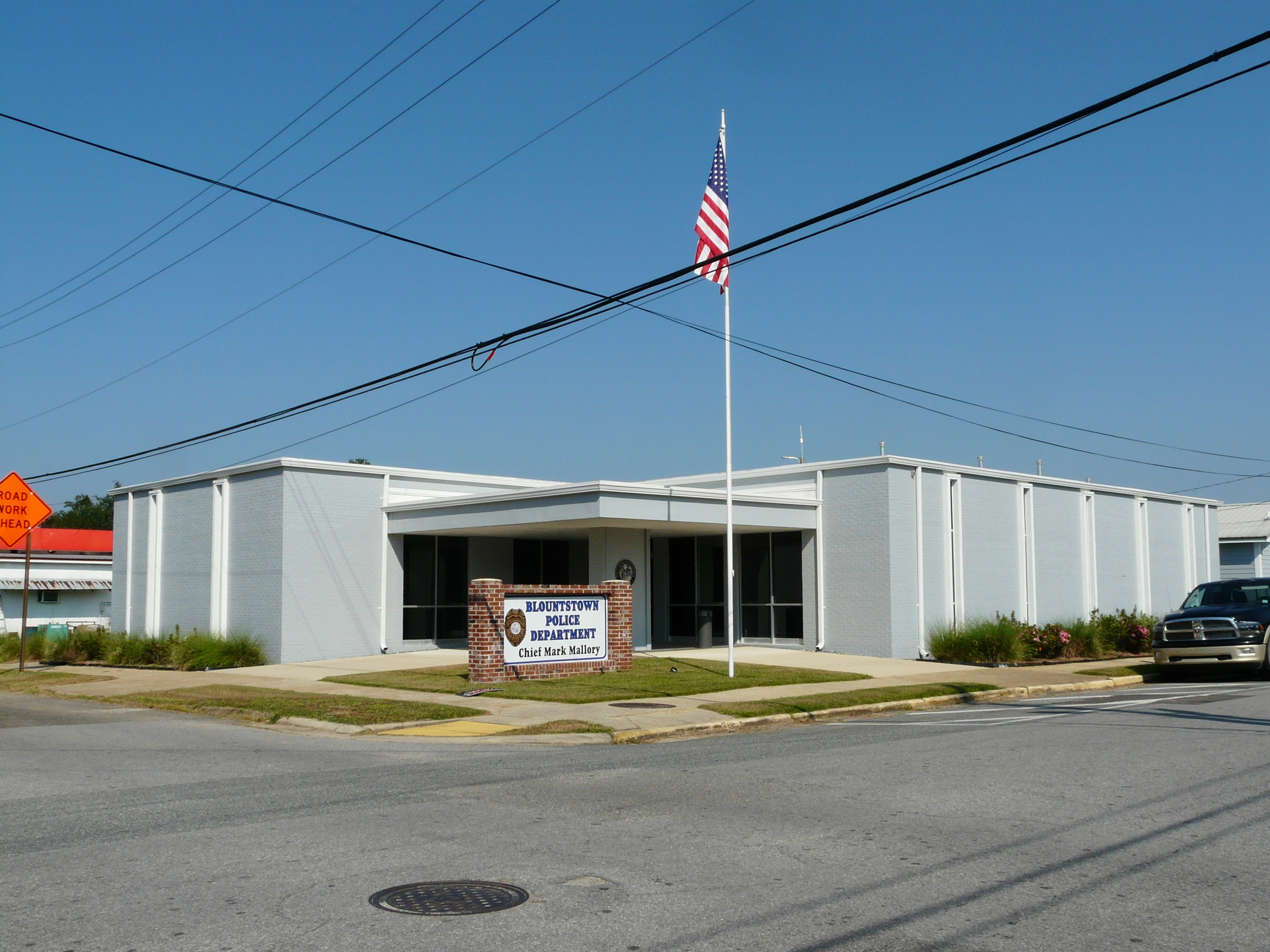
Blountstown Police Department

The old Calhoun County courthouse was located in Blountstown and is currently listed as a historic Florida landmark.

The city is home of the Calhoun Correctional Institution.

== Education ==
Calhoun County School District operates public schools.

There are three schools located within the city:

- Blountstown Elementary School for kindergarten through fifth grades
- Blountstown Middle School for sixth through eighth
- Blountstown High School for ninth through twelfth

== Notable people ==
- Patricia Dane, Hollywood actress of 1940s and early 1950s; starred in films Grand Central Murder, Johnny Eager and Life Begins for Andy Hardy; wife of bandleader Tommy Dorsey; died in Blountstown in 1995
- Corn Griffin, Heavyweight boxer born in Blountstown, whose memorable 1934 TKO loss to James J. Braddock was recreated for the 2005 film Cinderella Man
- Carey Loftin, Hollywood stuntman and actor, born in Blountstown
- Elam Stoltzfus, Suncoast Emmy award-winning American environmental documentary filmmaker
- Fuller Warren, 30th governor of Florida

== Gallery ==
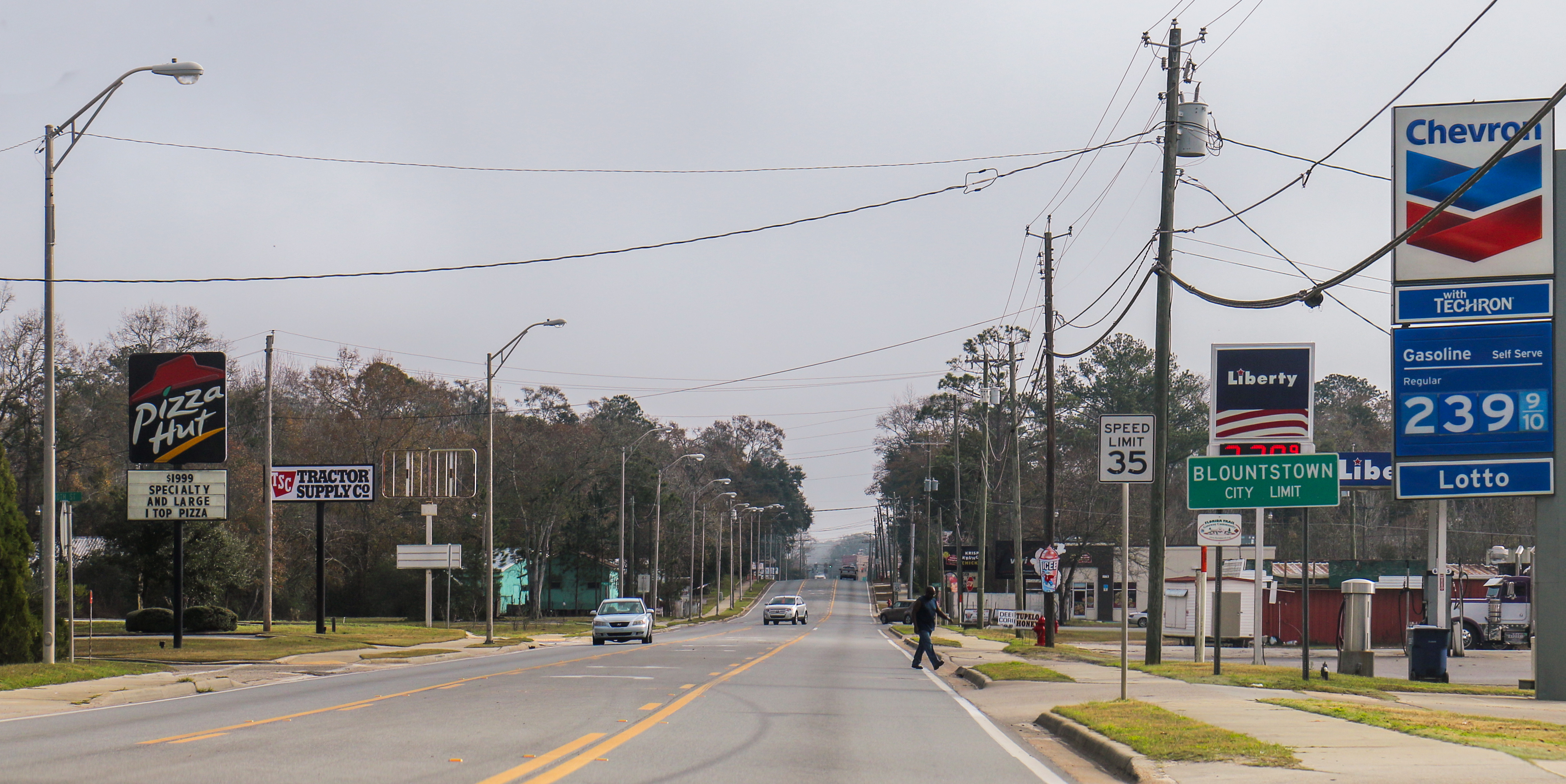
Sign for Blountstown

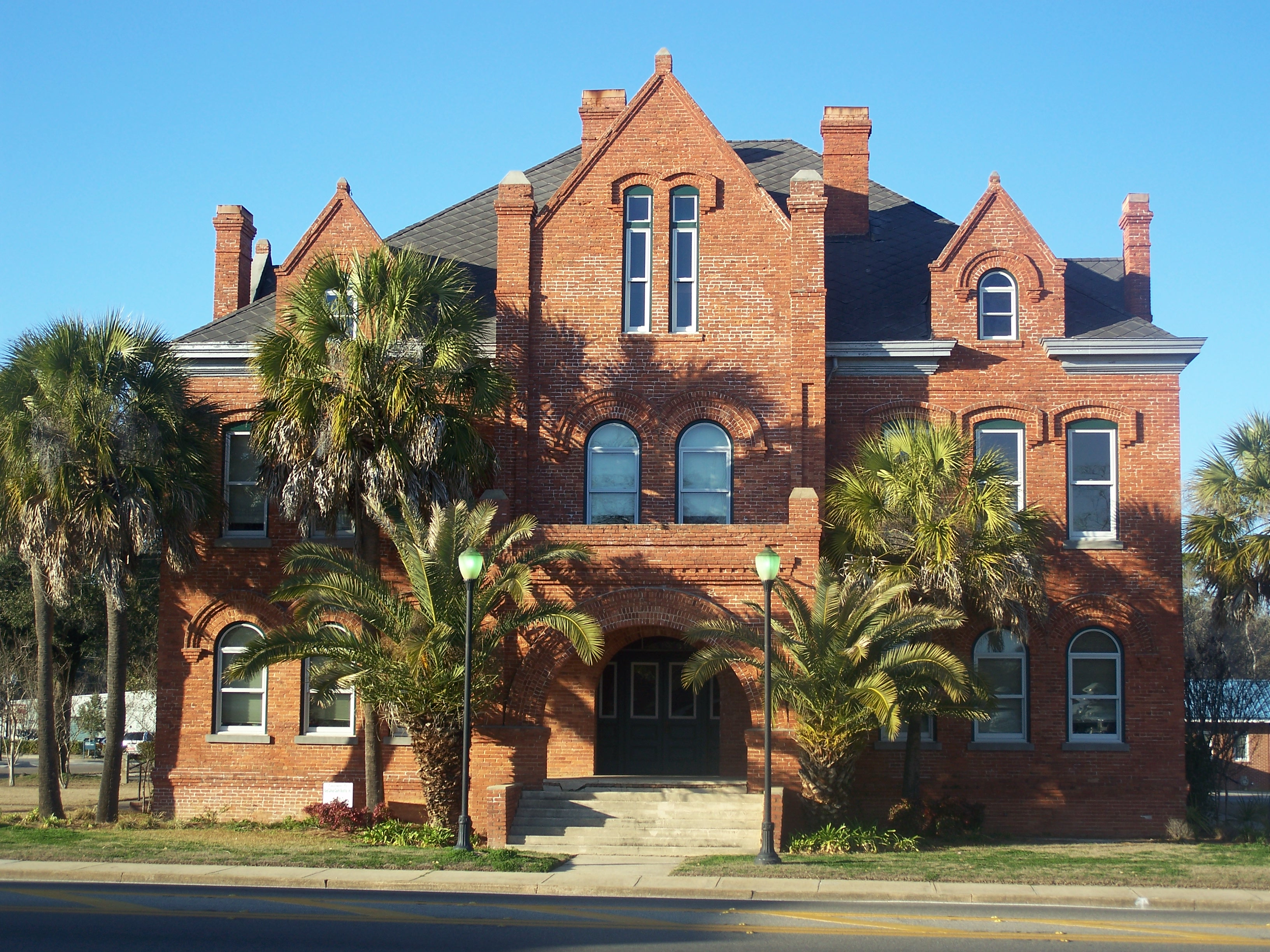
Old Calhoun County Courthouse

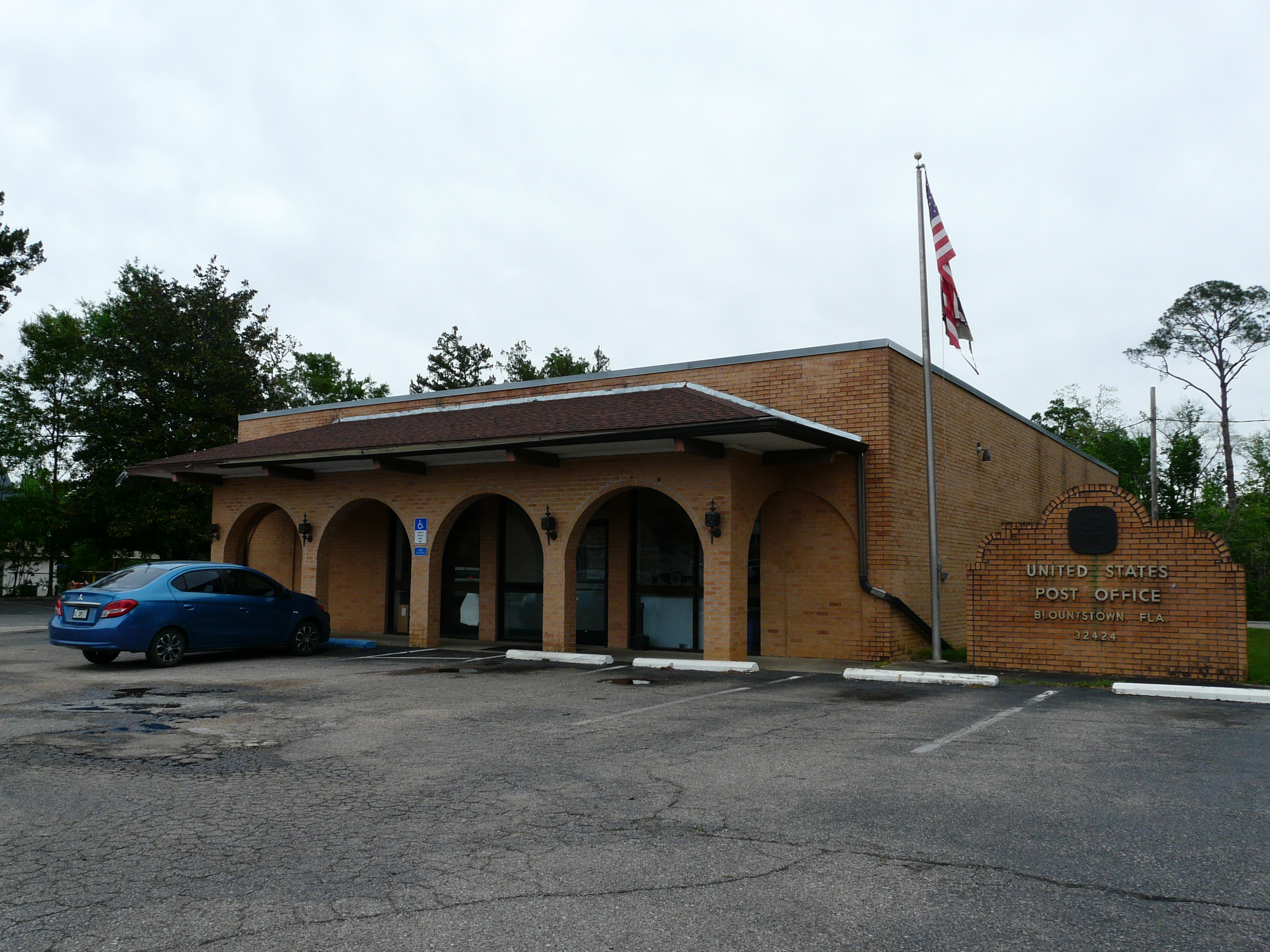
Post Office

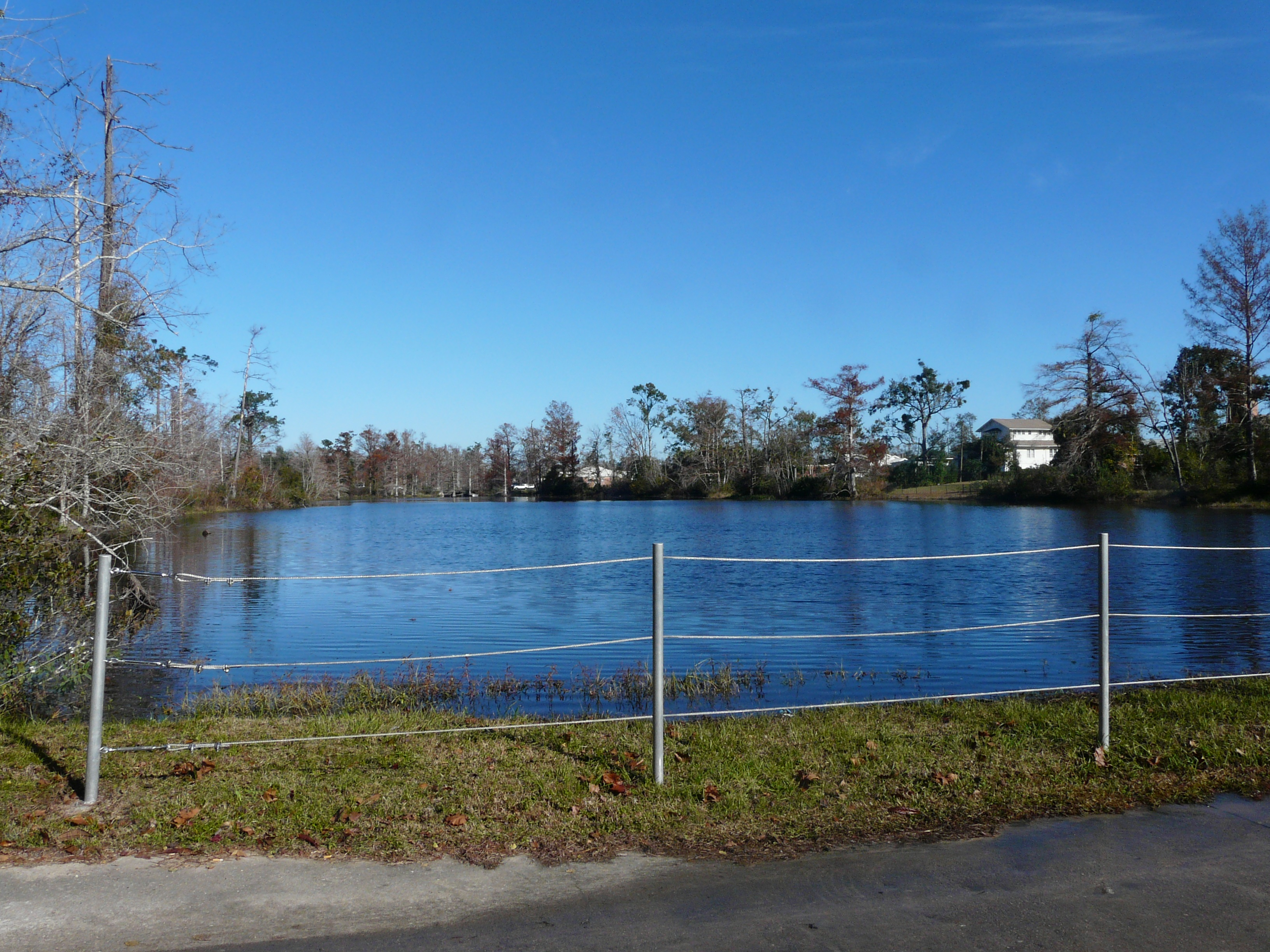
Lake Hilda
