= William L. Proctor =

American politician and university administrator

William Lee Proctor
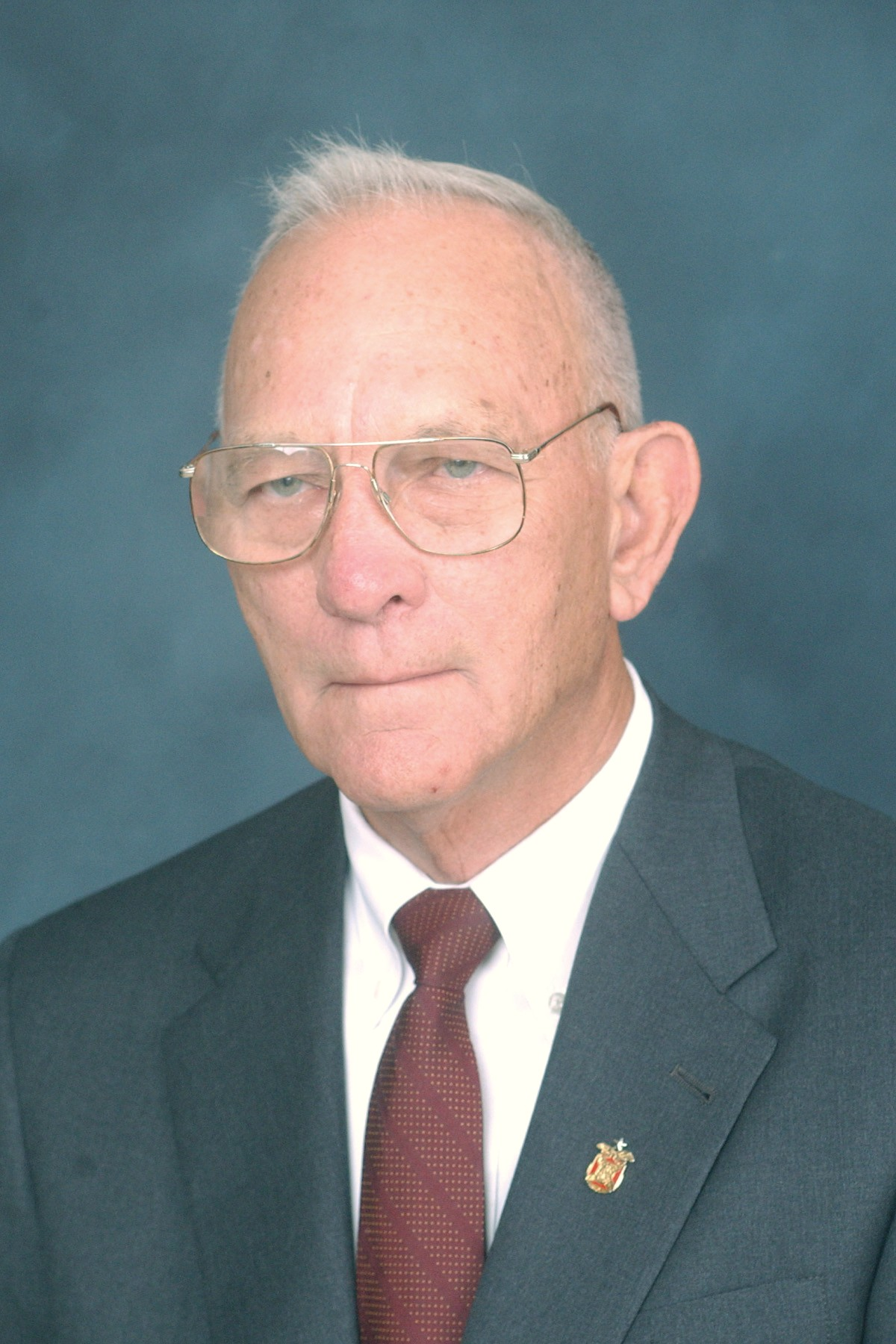

Member of the Florida House of Representatives from the 20th district
- In office November 2004 – November 2012
- Preceded by: Doug Wiles
- Succeeded by: Clovis Watson Jr.

President of Flagler College
- In office 1971–2001

Personal details
- Born: January 27, 1933 (age 93) Atlanta, Georgia
- Spouse: Pamela Evans Duke
- Education: University of Florida; Florida State; Stetson University
- Profession: Educator

William L. Proctor (born January 27, 1933) is an American politician and university administrator. Proctor served as president of Flagler College in St. Augustine, Florida between 1971 and 2001. He then served as Chancellor of Flagler College from 2001 to his retirement from that post in 2020.

In addition, he has served on Florida's State Board of Education, as a state representative for the Florida Legislature, as a St. Augustine city commissioner, as a chairman of the Independent Colleges and Universities of Florida association, as a member of the board of trustees of the Florida School for the Deaf and Blind and as a vice-chairman of the Florida Education Standards Commission.

== Early life and education ==
Proctor was born in Atlanta, Georgia in 1933, and moved to Florida in 1944. Proctor attended the University of Florida, Stetson University, and Florida State University. From Florida State University, he received a bachelor of science in education, a master of science in education, and doctorate in education administration in the years 1956, 1964, and 1968, respectively.

Proctor served in the United States Army Reserve from 1954 through 1964.

=== College football ===
Proctor played college football at Florida State University in 1955 and was selected in the 1955 NFL draft by the Cleveland Browns, in the 20th round, although he never played professionally. He was inducted into Florida State University's Athletic Hall of Fame in 1988.

== Career in education and administration ==
Proctor worked as a teacher, coach, and school superintendent in public schools.

For 30 years (until 2001) Proctor worked a president of Flagler College.

During the governorship of Jeb Bush, from 2001 to 2004 Proctor served as a member of the Florida Board of Education.

Proctor served as chairman of the Independent Colleges and Universities of Florida association, as a member of the board of trustees of the Florida School for the Deaf and Blind and as a vice-chairman of the Florida Education Standards Commission.

In 2007, Proctor was named the interim athletic director for the Florida State Seminoles, serving until Randy Spetman was hired as the permanent athletic director in February 2008.

== Politics ==
Proctor is a member of the Republican Party.

Proctor was a member of the St. Augustine City Commission.

=== Florida House of Representatives ===
Proctor was elected to the Florida House of Representatives, where he represented the 20th district from 2004 to 2012.

In the 2009–2010 legislative session he served as chair of the State Universities & Private College Appropriations Committee. In that session, he was also was a member Education Policy Council; Apprpriations Council on Education & Economic Development; Secret Policy Council on Strategic and Economic Planning; and State Universities & Private Colleges Policy Committee.

In the 2011–2012 legislative session, he served as chair of the education committee and as a member of the appropriations committee.
