= List of United States representatives from Florida =

The following is an alphabetical list of United States representatives from the state of Florida. For chronological tables of members of both houses of the United States Congress from the state (through the present day), see Florida's congressional delegations. The list of names should be complete, but other data may be incomplete.

== Current members ==
List of current United States representatives from Florida:

Current U.S. representatives from Florida
District	Member (Residence)	Party	Incumbent since	CPVI	District map
1st	Jimmy Patronis (Fort Walton Beach)	Republican	April 2, 2025	R+18	
2nd	Neal Dunn (Panama City)	Republican	January 3, 2017	R+8	
3rd	Kat Cammack (Gainesville)	Republican	January 3, 2021	R+10	
4th	Aaron Bean (Fernandina Beach)	Republican	January 3, 2023	R+5	
5th	John Rutherford (Jacksonville)	Republican	January 3, 2017	R+10	
6th	Randy Fine (Melbourne Beach)	Republican	April 2, 2025	R+14	
7th	Cory Mills (New Smyrna Beach)	Republican	January 3, 2023	R+5	
8th	Mike Haridopolos (Indian Harbour Beach)	Republican	January 3, 2025	R+8	
9th	Darren Soto (Kissimmee)	Democratic	January 3, 2017	R+8	
10th	Maxwell Frost (Orlando)	Democratic	January 3, 2023	D+13	
11th	Daniel Webster (Clermont)	Republican	January 3, 2011	R+7	
12th	Gus Bilirakis (Palm Harbor)	Republican	January 3, 2007	R+7	
13th	Anna Paulina Luna (St. Petersburg)	Republican	January 3, 2023	R+6	
14th	Kathy Castor (Tampa)	Democratic	January 3, 2007	R+4	
15th	Laurel Lee (Tampa)	Republican	January 3, 2023	R+9	
16th	Vern Buchanan (Sarasota)	Republican	January 3, 2007	R+6	
17th	Greg Steube (Sarasota)	Republican	January 3, 2019	R+10	
18th	Scott Franklin (Lakeland)	Republican	January 3, 2021	R+8	
19th	Byron Donalds (Naples)	Republican	January 3, 2021	R+14	
20th	Vacant		April 21, 2026	D+20	
21st	Brian Mast (Fort Pierce)	Republican	January 3, 2017	R+7	
22nd	Lois Frankel (West Palm Beach)	Democratic	January 3, 2013	R+4	
23rd	Jared Moskowitz (Parkland)	Democratic	January 3, 2023	D+9	
24th	Frederica Wilson (Miami Gardens)	Democratic	January 3, 2011	D+22	
25th	Debbie Wasserman Schultz (Weston)	Democratic	January 3, 2005	R+3	
26th	Mario Díaz-Balart (Miami)	Republican	January 3, 2003	R+7	
27th	María Elvira Salazar (Miami)	Republican	January 3, 2021	R+6	
28th	Carlos A. Giménez (Miami)	Republican	January 3, 2021	R+10	

== List of members and delegates ==
Member/delegate	Party	District	Years	Electoral history
Sandy Adams	Republican	24th	January 3, 2011 – January 3, 2013	Elected in 2010. Redistricted to the 7th district and lost renomination to Mica.
Jim Bacchus	Democratic	11th	January 3, 1991 – January 3, 1993	Elected in 1990. Redistricted to the 15th district.
Jim Bacchus	Democratic	15th	January 3, 1993 – January 3, 1995	Redistricted from the 11th district and re-elected in 1992. Retired.
Skip Bafalis	Republican	10th	January 3, 1973 – January 3, 1983	Elected in 1972. Retired to run for Governor.
Aaron Bean	Republican	4th	January 3, 2023 – present	Elected in 2022. Incumbent
Charles Edward Bennett	Democratic	2nd	January 3, 1949 – January 3, 1967	Elected in 1948. Redistricted to the 3rd district.
Charles Edward Bennett	Democratic	3rd	January 3, 1967 – January 3, 1993	Redistricted from the 2nd district and re-elected in 1966. Retired.
Gus Bilirakis	Republican	9th	January 3, 2007 – January 3, 2013	Elected in 2006. Redistricted to the 12th district.
Gus Bilirakis	Republican	12th	January 3, 2013 – present	Redistricted from the 9th district and re-elected in 2012. Incumbent
Michael Bilirakis	Republican	9th	January 3, 1983 – January 3, 2007	Elected in 1982. Retired.
Horatio Bisbee Jr.	Republican	2nd	March 4, 1877 – February 20, 1879	Elected in 1876. Lost election contest for the 1876 election and lost re-election to Hull.
Horatio Bisbee Jr.	Republican	2nd	January 22, 1881 – March 4, 1881	Won election contest for the 1878 election. Lost re-election to Finley.
Horatio Bisbee Jr.	Republican	2nd	June 1, 1882 – March 4, 1885	Won election contest for the 1880 election. Re-elected 1882. Lost re-election to Dougherty.
Allen Boyd	Democratic	2nd	January 3, 1997 – January 3, 2011	Elected in 1996. Lost re-election to Southerland.
William Henry Brockenbrough	Democratic	At-large	January 24, 1846 – March 4, 1847	Won election contest for the 1845 special election. Retired.
Corrine Brown	Democratic	3rd	January 3, 1993 – January 3, 2013	Elected in 1992. Redistricted to the 5th district.
Corrine Brown	Democratic	5th	January 3, 2013 – January 3, 2017	Redistricted from the 3rd district and re-elected in 2012. Lost renomination to Lawson.
Ginny Brown-Waite	Republican	5th	January 3, 2003 – January 3, 2011	Elected in 2002. Retired.
Vern Buchanan	Republican	13th	January 3, 2007 – January 3, 2013	Elected in 2006. Redistricted to the 16th district.
Vern Buchanan	Republican	16th	January 3, 2013 – present	Redistricted from the 13th district and re-elected in 2012. Incumbent.
Robert Bullock	Democratic	2nd	March 4, 1889 – March 4, 1893	Elected in 1888. Retired.
J. Herbert Burke	Republican	10th	January 3, 1967 – January 3, 1973	Elected in 1966. Redistricted to the 12th district.
J. Herbert Burke	Republican	12th	January 3, 1973 – January 3, 1979	Redistricted from the 10th district and re-elected in 1972. Lost re-election to Stack.
Edward Carrington Cabell	Whig	At-large	October 6, 1845 – January 24, 1846	Elected to finish Yulee's term. Lost election contest for the 1845 special election.
Edward Carrington Cabell	Whig	At-large	March 4, 1847 – March 4, 1853	Elected in 1846. Lost re-election to Maxwell.
Millard F. Caldwell	Democratic	3rd	March 4, 1933 – January 3, 1941	Elected in 1932. Retired.
Richard K. Call	Unknown	Territory	March 4, 1823 – March 4, 1825	Elected in 1823. Retired.
Kat Cammack	Republican	3rd	January 3, 2021 – present	Elected in 2020. Incumbent
Courtney W. Campbell	Democratic	1st	January 3, 1953 – January 3, 1955	Elected in 1952. Lost re-election to Cramer.
Charles T. Canady	Republican	12th	January 3, 1993 – January 3, 2001	Elected in 1992. Retired.
Pat Cannon	Democratic	4th	January 3, 1939 – January 3, 1947	Elected in 1938. Lost renomination to Smathers.
Kathy Castor	Democratic	11th	January 3, 2007 – January 3, 2013	Elected in 2006. Redistricted to the 14th district.
Kathy Castor	Democratic	14th	January 3, 2013 – present	Redistricted from the 11th district and re-elected in 2012. Incumbent.
Bill Chappell	Democratic	4th	January 3, 1969 – January 3, 1989	Elected in 1968. Lost re-election to James.
Sheila Cherfilus-McCormick	Democratic	20th	January 11, 2022 – April 21, 2026	Elected to finish Hastings's term. Resigned.
Frank Clark	Democratic	2nd	March 4, 1905 – March 4, 1925	Elected in 1904. Lost renomination to Green.
Curt Clawson	Republican	19th	June 25, 2014 – January 3, 2017	Elected to finish Radel's term. Retired.
Charles Merian Cooper	Democratic	2nd	March 4, 1893 – March 4, 1897	Elected in 1892. Retired.
William C. Cramer	Republican	1st	January 3, 1955 – January 3, 1963	Elected in 2006. Redistricted to the 12th district.
William C. Cramer	Republican	12th	January 3, 1963 – January 3, 1967	Redistricted from the 1st district and re-elected in 1962. Redistricted to the 8th district.
William C. Cramer	Republican	8th	January 3, 1967 – January 3, 1971	Redistricted from the 12th district and re-elected in 1966. Retired to run for U.S. senator.
Ander Crenshaw	Republican	4th	January 3, 2001 – January 3, 2017	Elected in 2000. Retired.
Charlie Crist	Democratic	13th	January 3, 2017 – August 31, 2022	Elected in 2016. Retired to run for governor and resigned early.
Carlos Curbelo	Republican	26th	January 3, 2015 – January 3, 2019	Elected in 2014. Lost re-election to Mucarsel-Powell.
Robert H. M. Davidson	Democratic	1st	March 4, 1877 – March 4, 1891	Elected in 1876. Lost renomination to Mallory II.
Jim Davis	Democratic	11th	January 3, 1997 – January 3, 2007	Elected in 1996. Retired to run for Governor.
Robert Wyche Davis	Democratic	2nd	March 4, 1897 – March 4, 1905	Elected in 1896. Retired.
Val Demings	Democratic	10th	January 3, 2017 – January 3, 2023	Elected in 2016. Retired to run for U.S. senator.
Ron DeSantis	Republican	6th	January 3, 2013 – September 10, 2018	Elected in 2012. Resigned to run for governor.
Ted Deutch	Democratic	19th	April 13, 2010 – January 3, 2013	Elected to finish Wexler's term. Redistricted to the 21st district.
Ted Deutch	Democratic	21st	January 3, 2013 – January 3, 2017	Redistricted from the 19th district and re-elected in 2012. Redistricted to the 22nd district.
Ted Deutch	Democratic	22nd	January 3, 2017 – September 30, 2022	Redistricted from the 21st district and re-elected in 2016. Retired and resigned early
Peter Deutsch	Democratic	20th	January 3, 1993 – January 3, 2005	Elected in 1992. Retired to run for U.S. senator.
Lincoln Díaz-Balart	Republican	21st	January 3, 1993 – January 3, 2011	Elected in 1992. Retired.
Mario Díaz-Balart	Republican	25th	January 3, 2003 – January 3, 2011	Elected in 2002. Redistricted to the 21st district.
Mario Díaz-Balart	Republican	21st	January 3, 2011 – January 3, 2013	Redistricted from the 25th district and re-elected in 2010. Redistricted to the 25th district.
Mario Díaz-Balart	Republican	25th	January 3, 2013 – January 3, 2023	Redistricted from the 21st district and re-elected in 2012. Redistricted to the 26th district.
Mario Díaz-Balart	Republican	26th	January 3, 2023 – present	Redistricted from the 25th district and re-elected in 2022. Incumbent
Byron Donalds	Republican	19th	January 3, 2021 – present	Elected in 2020. Incumbent
Charles Dougherty	Democratic	2nd	March 4, 1885 – March 4, 1889	Elected in 1884. Retired.
Charles Downing	Democratic	Territory	March 4, 1837 – March 4, 1841	Elected in 1836. Retired.
Herbert J. Drane	Democratic	1st	March 4, 1917 – March 4, 1933	Elected in 1916. Lost renomination to Peterson.
Neal Dunn	Republican	2nd	January 3, 2017 – present	Elected in 2016. Incumbent
Dante Fascell	Democratic	4th	January 3, 1955 – January 3, 1963	Elected in 1954. Redistricted to the 12th district.
Dante Fascell	Democratic	12th	January 3, 1963 – January 3, 1973	Redistricted from the 4th district and re-elected in 1962. Redistricted to the 15th district.
Dante Fascell	Democratic	15th	January 3, 1973 – January 3, 1983	Redistricted from the 12th district and re-elected in 1972. Redistricted to the 19th district.
Dante Fascell	Democratic	19th	January 3, 1983 – January 3, 1993	Redistricted from the 15th district and re-elected in 1982. Retired.
Tom Feeney	Republican	24th	January 3, 2003 – January 3, 2009	Elected in 2002. Lost re-election to Kosmas.
Randy Fine	Republican	6th	April 1, 2025 – present	Elected to finish Waltz's term. Incumbent.
Jesse J. Finley	Democratic	2nd	April 19, 1876 – March 4, 1877	Won election contest for the 1874 election. Lost re-election to Bisbee Jr.
Jesse J. Finley	Democratic	2nd	February 20, 1879 – March 4, 1879	Won election contest for the 1876 election. Retired.
Jesse J. Finley	Democratic	2nd	March 4, 1881 – June 1, 1882	Elected in 1880. Lost election contest for the 1880 election.
Mark Foley	Republican	16th	January 3, 1995 – September 29, 2006	Elected in 1994. Ran for re-election but withdrew and resigned.
Tillie Fowler	Republican	4th	January 3, 1993 – January 3, 2001	Elected in 1992. Retired.
Lois Frankel	Democratic	22nd	January 3, 2013 – January 3, 2017	Elected in 2012. Redistricted to the 21st district.
Lois Frankel	Democratic	21st	January 3, 2017 – January 3, 2023	Redistricted from the 22nd district and re-elected in 2016. Redistricted to the 22nd district.
Lois Frankel	Democratic	22nd	January 3, 2023 – present	Redistricted from the 21st district and re-elected in 2016. Incumbent.
Scott Franklin	Republican	15th	January 3, 2021 – January 3, 2023	Elected in 2020. Redistricted to the 18th district.
Scott Franklin	Republican	18th	January 3, 2023 – present	Redistricted from the 15th district and re-elected in 2022. Incumbent.
Lou Frey	Republican	5th	January 3, 1969 – January 3, 1973	Elected in 1968. Redistricted to the 9th district.
Lou Frey	Republican	9th	January 3, 1973 – January 3, 1979	Redistricted from the 5th district and re-elected in 1972. Retired to run for governor.
Maxwell Frost	Democratic	10th	January 3, 2023 – present	Elected in 2022. Incumbent
Don Fuqua	Democratic	9th	January 3, 1963 – January 3, 1967	Elected in 1962. Redistricted to the 1st district.
Don Fuqua	Democratic	1st	January 3, 1967 – January 3, 1987	Redistricted from the 9th district and re-elected in 1966. Retired.
Matt Gaetz	Republican	1st	January 3, 2017 – November 13, 2024	Elected in 2016. Re-elected in 2024 but resigned.
Joe Garcia	Democratic	27th	January 3, 2013 – January 3, 2015	Elected in 2012. Lost re-election to Curbelo.
Sam Gibbons	Democratic	10th	January 3, 1963 – January 3, 1967	Elected in 1962. Redistricted to the 6th district.
Sam Gibbons	Democratic	6th	January 3, 1967 – January 3, 1973	Redistricted from the 10th district and re-elected in 1966. Redistricted to the 7th district.
Sam Gibbons	Democratic	7th	January 3, 1973 – January 3, 1993	Redistricted from the 6th district and re-elected in 1972. Redistricted to the 11th district.
Sam Gibbons	Democratic	11th	January 3, 1993 – January 3, 1997	Redistricted from the 7th district and re-elected in 1992. Retired.
Carlos A. Giménez	Republican	26th	January 3, 2021 – January 3, 2023	Elected in 2020. Redistricted to the 28th district.
Carlos A. Giménez	Republican	28th	January 3, 2023 – present	Redistricted from the 26th district and re-elected in 2022. Incumbent
Porter Goss	Republican	13th	January 3, 1989 – January 3, 1993	Elected in 1988. Redistricted to the 14th district.
Porter Goss	Republican	14th	January 3, 1993 – September 23, 2004	Redistricted from the 13th district and re-elected in 1992. Resigned to become Director of Central Intelligence.
Gwen Graham	Democratic	2nd	January 3, 2015 – January 3, 2017	Elected in 2014. Retired.
Bill Grant	Democratic	2nd	January 3, 1987 – February 21, 1989	Elected in 1986. Changed parties.
Bill Grant	Republican	2nd	February 21, 1989 – January 3, 1991	Changed parties. Lost re-election to Peterson.
Alan Grayson	Democratic	8th	January 3, 2009 – January 3, 2011	Elected in 2008. Lost re-election to Webster.
Alan Grayson	Democratic	9th	January 3, 2013 – January 3, 2017	Elected in 2012. Retired to run for U.S. senator.
Robert A. Green	Democratic	2nd	March 4, 1925 – January 3, 1943	Elected in 1924. Redistricted to the at-large district.
Robert A. Green	Democratic	At-large	January 3, 1943 – November 25, 1944	Redistricted from the 2nd district and re-elected in 1942. Resigned to become lieutenant commander in the U.S. Navy.
Bill Gunter	Democratic	5th	January 3, 1973 – January 3, 1975	Elected in 1972. Retired to run for U.S. senator.
Edward Gurney	Republican	11th	January 3, 1963 – January 3, 1967	Elected in 1962. Redistricted to the 5th district.
Edward Gurney	Republican	5th	January 3, 1967 – January 3, 1969	Redistricted from the 11th district and re-elected in 1966. Retired to run for U.S. senator.
James A. Haley	Democratic	7th	January 3, 1953 – January 3, 1973	Elected in 1952. Redistricted to the 8th district.
James A. Haley	Democratic	8th	January 3, 1973 – January 3, 1977	Redistricted from the 7th district and re-elected in 1972. Retired.
Charles M. Hamilton	Republican	At-large	July 1, 1868 – March 4, 1871	Elected in 1868. Lost renomination to Walls.
Mike Haridopolos	Republican	8th	January 3, 2025 – present	Elected in 2024. Incumbent
Katherine Harris	Republican	13th	January 3, 2003 – January 3, 2007	Elected in 2002. Retired to run for U.S. senator.
Alcee Hastings	Democratic	23rd	January 3, 1993 – January 3, 2013	Elected in 1992. Redistricted to the 20th district.
Alcee Hastings	Democratic	20th	January 3, 2013 – April 6, 2021	Redistricted from the 23rd district and re-elected in 2012. Died.
George Sydney Hawkins	Democratic	At-large	March 4, 1857 – January 21, 1861	Elected in 1856. Withdrew due to the secession of Florida.
Joe Hendricks	Democratic	5th	January 3, 1937 – January 3, 1949	Elected in 1936. Retired.
Joseph Marion Hernández	Unknown	Territory	September 30, 1822 – March 4, 1823	Elected in 1822. Lost re-election to Call.
Syd Herlong	Democratic	5th	January 3, 1949 – January 3, 1967	Elected in 1948. Redistricted to the 4th district.
Syd Herlong	Democratic	4th	January 3, 1967 – January 3, 1969	Redistricted from the 5th district and re-elected in 1966. Retired.
Noble A. Hull	Democratic	2nd	March 4, 1879 – January 22, 1881	Elected in 1878. Lost election contest for the 1878 election.
Earl Hutto	Democratic	1st	January 3, 1979 – January 3, 1995	Elected in 1978. Retired.
Andy Ireland	Democratic	8th	January 3, 1977 – January 3, 1983	Elected in 1976. Redistricted to the 10th district.
Andy Ireland	Democratic	10th	January 3, 1983 – July 15, 1984	Redistricted from the 8th district and re-elected in 1982. Changed parties.
Andy Ireland	Republican	10th	July 15, 1984 – January 3, 1993	Changed parties. Retired.
Craig James	Republican	4th	January 3, 1989 – January 3, 1993	Elected in 1988. Retired.
David Jolly	Republican	13th	March 11, 2014 – January 3, 2017	Elected to finish Young's term. Lost re-election to Crist.
Harry Johnston	Democratic	14th	January 3, 1989 – January 3, 1993	Elected in 1988. Redistricted to the 19th district.
Harry Johnston	Democratic	19th	January 3, 1993 – January 3, 1997	Redistricted from the 14th district and re-elected in 1992. Retired.
Walter Kehoe	Democratic	3rd	March 4, 1917 – March 4, 1919	Elected in 1916. Lost renomination to Smithwick.
Ric Keller	Republican	8th	January 3, 2001 – January 3, 2009	Elected in 2000. Lost re-election to Grayson.
Richard Kelly	Republican	5th	January 3, 1975 – January 3, 1981	Elected in 1974. Lost renomination to McCollum.
Ron Klein	Democratic	22nd	January 3, 2007 – January 3, 2011	Elected in 2006. Lost re-election to West.
Suzanne Kosmas	Democratic	24th	January 3, 2009 – January 3, 2011	Elected in 2008. Lost re-election to Adams.
William Bailey Lamar	Democratic	3rd	March 4, 1903 – March 4, 1909	Elected in 1902. Retired to run for U.S. senator.
William C. Lantaff	Democratic	4th	January 3, 1951 – January 3, 1955	Elected in 1950. Retired.
Al Lawson	Democratic	5th	January 3, 2017 – January 3, 2023	Elected in 2016. Redistricted to the 2nd district and lost re-election to Dunn.
Laurel Lee	Republican	15th	January 3, 2023 – present	Elected in 2022. Incumbent
William Lehman	Democratic	13th	January 3, 1973 – January 3, 1983	Elected in 1972. Redistricted to the 17th district.
William Lehman	Democratic	17th	January 3, 1983 – January 3, 1993	Redistricted from the 13th district and re-elected in 1982. Retired.
Claude L'Engle	Democratic	At-large	March 4, 1913 – March 4, 1915	Elected in 1912. Redistricted to the 4th district and lost renomination to Sears.
Tom Lewis	Republican	12th	January 3, 1983 – January 3, 1993	Elected in 1982. Redistricted to the 16th district.
Tom Lewis	Republican	16th	January 3, 1993 – January 3, 1995	Redistricted from the 12th district and re-elected in 1992. Retired.
Anna Paulina Luna	Republican	13th	January 3, 2023 – present	Elected in 2022. Incumbent
Connie Mack	Republican	13th	January 3, 1983 – January 3, 1989	Elected in 1982. Retired to run for U.S. senator.
Connie Mack IV	Republican	14th	January 3, 2005 – January 3, 2013	Elected in 2004. Retired to run for U.S. senator.
Buddy MacKay	Democratic	6th	January 3, 1983 – January 3, 1989	Elected in 1982. Retired to run for U.S. senator.
Tim Mahoney	Democratic	16th	January 3, 2007 – January 3, 2009	Elected in 2006. Lost re-election to Rooney.
Stephen Mallory II	Democratic	1st	March 4, 1891 – March 4, 1895	Elected in 1890. Retired.
Brian Mast	Republican	18th	January 3, 2017 – January 3, 2023	Elected in 2016. Redistricted to the 21st district.
Brian Mast	Republican	21st	January 3, 2023 – present	Redistricted from the 18th district and re-elected in 1992. Incumbent.
Donald Ray Matthews	Democratic	8th	January 3, 1953 – January 3, 1967	Elected in 1952. Redistricted to the 2nd district and lost renomination to Fuqua.
Augustus Maxwell	Democratic	At-large	March 4, 1853 – March 4, 1857	Elected in 1852. Retired.
Dannite H. Mays	Democratic	3rd	March 4, 1909 – March 4, 1913	Elected in 1908. Lost renomination to Wilson.
Bill McCollum	Republican	5th	January 3, 1981 – January 3, 1993	Elected in 1980. Redistricted to the 8th district.
Bill McCollum	Republican	8th	January 3, 1993 – January 3, 2001	Redistricted from the 5th district and re-elected in 1992. Retired to run for U.S. senator.
Chester B. McMullen	Democratic	1st	January 3, 1951 – January 3, 1953	Elected in 1950. Retired.
Carrie Meek	Democratic	17th	January 3, 1993 – January 3, 2003	Elected in 1992. Retired.
Kendrick Meek	Democratic	17th	January 3, 2003 – January 3, 2011	Elected in 2002. Retired to run for U.S. senator.
Dan Mica	Democratic	11th	January 3, 1979 – January 3, 1983	Elected in 1978. Redistricted to the 14th district.
Dan Mica	Democratic	14th	January 3, 1983 – January 3, 1989	Redistricted from the 11th district and re-elected in 1982. Retired to run for U.S. senator.
John Mica	Republican	7th	January 3, 1993 – January 3, 2017	Elected in 1992. Lost re-election to Murphy.
Dan Miller	Republican	13th	January 3, 1993 – January 3, 2003	Elected in 1992. Retired.
Jeff Miller	Republican	1st	October 16, 2001 – January 3, 2017	Elected to finish Scarborough's term. Retired.
Cory Mills	Republican	7th	January 3, 2023 – present	Elected in 2022. Incumbent.
Jared Moskowitz	Democratic	23rd	January 3, 2023 – present	Elected in 2022. Incumbent.
Debbie Mucarsel-Powell	Democratic	26th	January 3, 2019 – January 3, 2021	Elected in 2018. Lost re-election to Giménez.
Patrick Murphy	Democratic	18th	January 3, 2013 – January 3, 2017	Elected in 2012. Retired to run for U.S. senator.
Stephanie Murphy	Democratic	7th	January 3, 2017 – January 3, 2023	Elected in 2016. Retired.
Bill Nelson	Democratic	9th	January 3, 1979 – January 3, 1983	Elected in 1978. Redistricted to the 11th district.
Bill Nelson	Democratic	11th	January 3, 1983 – January 3, 1991	Redistricted from the 9th district and re-elected in 1982. Retired to run for governor.
Silas L. Niblack	Democratic	At-large	January 28, 1873 – March 4, 1873	Won election contest for the 1870 election. Lost re-election to Purman and Walls.
Rich Nugent	Republican	5th	January 3, 2011 – January 3, 2013	Elected in 2010. Redistricted to the 11th district.
Rich Nugent	Republican	11th	January 3, 2013 – January 3, 2017	Redistricted from the 5th district and re-elected in 2012. Retired.
Ruth Bryan Owen	Democratic	4th	March 4, 1929 – March 4, 1933	Elected in 1928. Lost renomination to Wilcox.
Jimmy Patronis	Republican	1st	April 1, 2025 – present	Elected to finish Gaetz's term. Incumbent.
Claude Pepper	Democratic	3rd	January 3, 1963 – January 3, 1967	Elected in 1962. Redistricted to the 11th district.
Claude Pepper	Democratic	11th	January 3, 1967 – January 3, 1973	Redistricted from the 3rd district and re-elected in 1966. Redistricted to the 14th district.
Claude Pepper	Democratic	14th	January 3, 1973 – January 3, 1983	Redistricted from the 11th district and re-elected in 1972. Redistricted to the 18th district.
Claude Pepper	Democratic	18th	January 3, 1983 – May 30, 1989	Redistricted from the 14th district and re-elected in 1982. Died.
J. Hardin Peterson	Democratic	1st	March 4, 1933 – January 3, 1951	Elected in 1932. Retired.
Pete Peterson	Democratic	2nd	January 3, 1991 – January 3, 1997	Elected in 1990. Retired.
Bill Posey	Republican	15th	January 3, 2009 – January 3, 2013	Elected in 2008. Redistricted to the 8th district.
Bill Posey	Republican	8th	January 3, 2013 – January 3, 2025	Redistricted from the 15th district and re-elected in 2012. Retired.
Emory H. Price	Democratic	2nd	January 3, 1943 – January 3, 1949	Elected in 1942. Lost renomination to Bennett.
William J. Purman	Republican	At-large	March 4, 1873 – January 25, 1875	Elected in 1872. Resigned.
William J. Purman	Republican	1st	March 4, 1875 – March 4, 1877	Elected in 1874. Lost re-election to Davidson.
Adam Putnam	Republican	12th	January 3, 2001 – January 3, 2011	Elected in 2000. Retired.
Trey Radel	Republican	19th	January 3, 2013 – January 27, 2014	Elected in 2012. Resigned
David Rivera	Republican	25th	January 3, 2011 – January 3, 2013	Elected in 2010. Lost re-election to Garcia.
Dwight L. Rogers	Democratic	6th	January 3, 1945 – December 1, 1954	Elected in 1944. Re-elected in 1954 but died prior to the next term.
Paul Rogers	Democratic	6th	January 11, 1955 – January 3, 1967	Elected to finish his father's term. Redistricted to the 9th district.
Paul Rogers	Democratic	9th	January 3, 1967 – January 3, 1973	Redistricted from the 6th district and re-elected in 1966. Redistricted to the 11th district.
Paul Rogers	Democratic	11th	January 3, 1973 – January 3, 1979	Redistricted from the 9th district and re-elected in 1972. Retired.
Francis Rooney	Republican	19th	January 3, 2017 – January 3, 2021	Elected in 2016. Retired.
Tom Rooney	Republican	16th	January 3, 2009 – January 3, 2013	Elected in 2008. Redistricted to the 17th district.
Tom Rooney	Republican	17th	January 3, 2013 – January 3, 2019	Redistricted from the 16th district and re-elected in 2012. Retired.
Ileana Ros-Lehtinen	Republican	18th	August 29, 1989 – January 3, 2013	Elected to finish Pepper's term. Redistricted to the 27th district.
Ileana Ros-Lehtinen	Republican	27th	January 3, 2013 – January 3, 2019	Redistricted from the 18th district and re-elected in 2012. Retired.
Dennis A. Ross	Republican	14th	January 3, 2011 – January 3, 2013	Elected in 2010. Redistricted to the 15th district.
Dennis A. Ross	Republican	15th	January 3, 2013 – January 3, 2019	Redistricted from the 14th district and re-elected in 2012. Retired.
John Rutherford	Republican	4th	January 3, 2017 – January 3, 2023	Elected in 2016. Redistricted to the 5th district.
John Rutherford	Republican	5th	January 3, 2023 – present	Redistricted from the 4th district and re-elected in 2022. Incumbent.
Maria Elvira Salazar	Republican	27th	January 3, 2021 – present	Elected in 2020. Incumbent.
Joe Scarborough	Republican	1st	January 3, 1995 – September 5, 2001	Elected in 1994. Resigned.
William J. Sears	Democratic	4th	March 4, 1915 – March 4, 1929	Elected in 1914. Lost renomination to Owen.
William J. Sears	Democratic	At-large	March 4, 1933 – January 3, 1937	Elected in 1932. Redistricted to the 5th district and lost renomination to Hendricks.
Donna Shalala	Democratic	27th	January 3, 2019 – January 3, 2021	Elected in 2018. Lost re-election to Salazar.
Clay Shaw	Republican	12th	January 3, 1981 – January 3, 1983	Elected in 1980. Redistricted to the 15th district.
Clay Shaw	Republican	15th	January 3, 1983 – January 3, 1993	Redistricted from the 12th district and re-elected in 1982. Redistricted to the 22nd district.
Clay Shaw	Republican	22nd	January 3, 1993 – January 3, 2007	Redistricted from the 15th district and re-elected in 1992. Lost re-election to Klein.
Bob Sikes	Democratic	3rd	January 3, 1941 – October 19, 1944	Elected in 1940. Resigned to serve in the U.S. Army during World War II.
Bob Sikes	Democratic	3rd	January 3, 1945 – January 3, 1963	Elected in 1944. Redistricted to the 1st district.
Bob Sikes	Democratic	1st	January 3, 1963 – January 3, 1979	Redistricted from the 3rd district and re-elected in 1962. Retired.
George Smathers	Democratic	4th	January 3, 1947 – January 3, 1951	Elected in 1946. Retired to run for U.S. senator.
Lawrence J. Smith	Democratic	16th	January 3, 1983 – January 3, 1993	Elected in 1982. Retired.
John H. Smithwick	Democratic	3rd	March 4, 1919 – March 4, 1927	Elected in 1918. Lost renomination to Yon.
Darren Soto	Democratic	9th	January 3, 2017 – present	Elected in 2016. Incumbent.
Steve Southerland	Republican	2nd	January 3, 2011 – January 3, 2015	Elected in 2010. Lost re-election to Graham.
Ross Spano	Republican	15th	January 3, 2019 – January 3, 2021	Elected in 2018. Lost renomination to Franklin.
Stephen M. Sparkman	Democratic	3rd	March 4, 1895 – March 4, 1917	Elected in 1894. Retired.
Edward J. Stack	Democratic	12th	January 3, 1979 – January 3, 1981	Elected in 1978. Lost renomination to Becker.
Cliff Stearns	Republican	6th	January 3, 1989 – January 3, 2013	Elected in 1988. Redistricted to the 3rd district and lost renomination to Yoho.
Greg Steube	Republican	17th	January 3, 2019 – present	Elected in 2018. Incumbent.
Karen Thurman	Democratic	5th	January 3, 1993 – January 3, 2003	Elected in 1992. Lost re-election to Brown-Waite.
Josiah T. Walls	Republican	At-large	March 4, 1871 – January 29, 1873	Elected in 1870. Lost election contest for the 1870 election.
Josiah T. Walls	Republican	At-large	March 4, 1873 – March 4, 1875	Elected in 1872. Redistricted to the 2nd district.
Josiah T. Walls	Republican	2nd	March 4, 1875 – April 19, 1876	Redistricted from the at-large district and re-elected in 1874. Lost election contest for the 1874 election.
Mike Waltz	Republican	6th	January 3, 2019 – January 20, 2025	Elected in 2018. Resigned to become United States National Security Advisor.
Debbie Wasserman Schultz	Democratic	20th	January 3, 2005 – January 3, 2013	Elected in 2004. Redistricted to the 23rd district.
Debbie Wasserman Schultz	Democratic	23rd	January 3, 2013 – January 3, 2023	Redistricted from the 20th district and re-elected in 2012. Redistricted to the 25th district.
Debbie Wasserman Schultz	Democratic	25th	January 3, 2023 – present	Redistricted from the 23rd district and re-elected in 2022. Incumbent.
Daniel Webster	Republican	8th	January 3, 2011 – January 3, 2013	Elected in 2010. Redistricted to the 10th district.
Daniel Webster	Republican	10th	January 3, 2013 – January 3, 2017	Redistricted from the 8th district and re-elected in 2012. Redistricted to the 11th district.
Daniel Webster	Republican	11th	January 3, 2017 – present	Redistricted from the 10th district and re-elected in 2016. Incumbent.
Dave Weldon	Republican	15th	January 3, 1995 – January 3, 2009	Elected in 1994. Retired.
Allen West	Republican	22nd	January 3, 2011 – January 3, 2013	Elected in 2010. Redistricted to the 18th district and lost re-election to Murphy.
Robert Wexler	Democratic	19th	January 3, 1997 – January 3, 2010	Elected in 1996. Resigned to become president of S. Daniel Abraham Center for Middle East Peace.
Joseph M. White	Unknown	Territory	March 4, 1825 – March 4, 1837	Elected in 1824. Lost re-election to Downing.
J. Mark Wilcox	Democratic	4th	March 4, 1933 – January 3, 1939	Elected in 1932. Retired to run for U.S. senator.
Emmett Wilson	Democratic	3rd	March 4, 1913 – March 4, 1917	Elected in 1912. Lost renomination to Kehoe.
Frederica Wilson	Democratic	17th	January 3, 2011 – January 3, 2013	Elected in 2010. Redistricted to the 24th district.
Frederica Wilson	Democratic	24th	January 3, 2013 – present	Redistricted from the 17th district and re-elected in 2012. Incumbent.
Ted Yoho	Republican	3rd	January 3, 2013 – January 3, 2021	Elected in 2012. Retired.
Tom A. Yon	Democratic	3rd	March 4, 1927 – March 4, 1933	Elected in 1926. Lost renomination to Caldwell.
Bill Young	Republican	8th	January 3, 1971 – January 3, 1973	Elected in 1970. Redistricted to the 6th district.
Bill Young	Republican	6th	January 3, 1973 – January 3, 1983	Redistricted from the 8th district and re-elected in 1972. Redistricted to the 8th district.
Bill Young	Republican	8th	January 3, 1983 – January 3, 1993	Redistricted from the 6th district and re-elected in 1982. Redistricted to the 10th district.
Bill Young	Republican	10th	January 3, 1993 – January 3, 2013	Redistricted from the 8th district and re-elected in 1992. Redistricted to the 13th district.
Bill Young	Republican	13th	January 3, 2013 – October 18, 2013	Redistricted from the 10th district and re-elected in 2012. Died.
David Levy Yulee	Democratic	Territory	March 4, 1841 – March 4, 1845	Elected in 1840. Re-elected in 1845 but declined to serve to become U.S. senator.

== See also ==
- Florida's congressional delegations
- Florida's congressional districts
- List of United States senators from Florida
