= 1878 United States House of Representatives elections in Florida =

United States House of Representatives elections in Florida, 1878
- November 5, 1878

Both of Florida's seats to the United States House of Representatives
	Majority party	Minority party
Party	Democratic	Republican
Last election	1	1
Seats won	2	0
Seat change	▲1	▼1
Popular vote	21,169	18,693
Percentage	53.1%	46.9%

Elections to the United States House of Representatives in Florida were held November 5, 1878 for the 46th Congress.

== Background ==
For the first few post-Reconstruction elections in Florida, the Republicans dominated Congressional elections. The previous election was the first election in which a Democrat won on the initial results (a Republican victory was successfully contested by a Democrat after the 1870 and 1874 elections). Going into the election, Florida's delegation was split between one Republican and one Democrat.

== Election results ==
1878 United States House election results
District	Democratic			Republican			Independent Republican		
1st	Robert H. M. Davidson (I)	11,529	56.8%	Simon B. Conover	8,601	40.9%	Edmund C. Weeks	464	2.3%
2nd	Noble A. Hull	9,640	50.0%	Horatio Bisbee, Jr. (I)	9,628	50.0%			

== Contested election ==
As in the 1874 and 1876 elections, the results in the 2nd district were successfully contested. This time, Horatio Bisbee, Jr. (R) successfully challenged the election of Noble A. Hull (D), and was declared with victor with a vote of 11,194 - 10,844, serving in House January 22 - March 3, 1881

== See also ==
- United States House of Representatives elections, 1878
