= 1872 Florida gubernatorial election =

- November 5, 1872
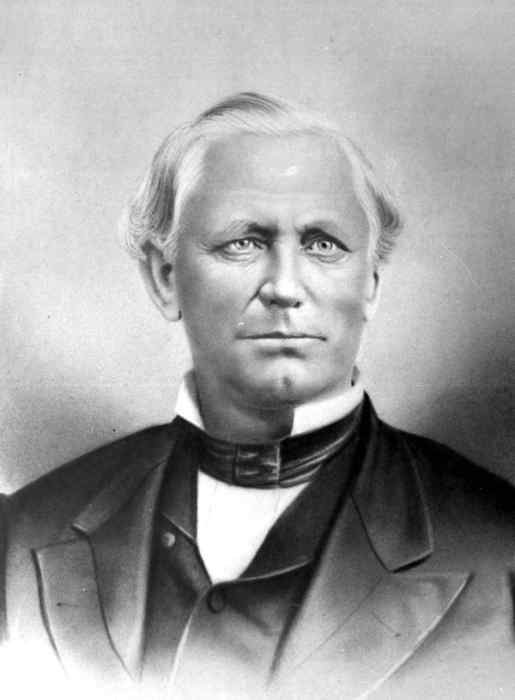

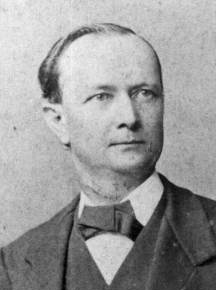
Nominee	Ossian B. Hart	William D. Bloxham
Party	Republican	Liberal Republican
Alliance		Democratic
Popular vote	17,603	16,004
Percentage	52.38%	47.62%
County results
Hart
50–60%
60–70%
70–80%
Bloxham
50–60%
60–70%
70–80%
80–90%
>90%
No votes
No votes
Governor before election
Harrison Reed
Republican
Elected Governor
Ossian B. Hart
Republican

The 1872 Florida gubernatorial election was held on November 5, 1872. Republican nominee Ossian B. Hart defeated the Liberal Republican Party nominee William D. Bloxham.

This election was the last time a Republican won until 1966.

== General election ==
=== Candidates ===
==== Republican ====
- Ossian B. Hart

==== Liberal Republican/Democratic ====
- William D. Bloxham

=== Results ===
1872 Florida gubernatorial election
Party	Candidate	Votes	%	±%
Republican	Ossian B. Hart	17,603	52.38%	
Liberal Republican	William D. Bloxham	16,004	47.62%	

==== Results by county ====
County	Ossian B. Hart Republican		William D. Bloxham Liberal Republican		Total votes
County	#	%	#	%	Total votes
Alachua	1,506	66.11%	772	33.89%	2,278
Baker	87	37.18%	147	62.82%	234
Bradford	191	29.03%	467	70.97%	658
Brevard*	0	0%	0	0%	0
Calhoun	37	19.17%	156	80.83%	193
Clay	111	31.53%	241	68.47%	352
Columbia	646	51.11%	618	48.89%	1,264
Dade	14	51.85%	13	48.15%	27
Duval	1,595	62.89%	941	37.11%	2,536
Escambia	789	52.60%	711	47.40%	1,500
Franklin	92	38.66%	146	61.34%	238
Gadsden	1,192	61.41%	749	38.59%	1,941
Hamilton	16	3.31%	467	96.69%	483
Hernando	6	3.19%	182	96.81%	188
Hillsborough	152	31.15%	336	68.85%	488
Holmes	6	2.58%	227	97.42%	233
Jackson	1,109	54.15%	939	45.85%	2,048
Jefferson	2,234	78.14%	625	21.86%	2,859
Lafayette	58	26.48%	161	73.52%	219
Leon	2,332	75.57%	754	24.43%	3,086
Levy	125	26.04%	355	73.96%	480
Liberty	46	27.22%	123	72.78%	169
Madison	1,297	64.85%	703	35.15%	2,000
Manatee	81	28.72%	201	71.28%	282
Marion	1,059	60.69%	686	39.31%	1,745
Monroe	280	30.70%	632	69.30%	912
Nassau	571	54.48%	477	45.52%	1,048
Orange	32	9.07%	321	90.93%	353
Polk	5	1.37%	360	98.63%	365
Putnam	388	48.84%	423	52.16%	811
Santa Rosa	358	38.37%	575	61.63%	933
St. Johns	182	32.10%	385	67.90%	567
Sumter	145	32.08%	307	67.92%	452
Suwannee	359	41.65%	503	58.35%	862
Taylor	94	37.15%	159	62.85%	253
Volusia	104	33.77%	204	66.23%	308
Wakulla	178	40.55%	261	59.45%	439
Walton	72	16.0%	378	84.0%	450
Washington	54	15.30%	299	84.70%	353
Totals	17,603	52.38%	16,004	47.62%	33,607
*Brevard County had no returns

Counties that flipped from Republican to Democratic

- Clay
- Hernando
- Lafayette
- Levy
- Manatee
- Putnam
- Santa Rosa
- Suwannee
- Wakulla

Counties that flipped from Radical Republican to Republican

- Duval
- Leon
- Nassau

Counties that flipped from Tied to Democratic

- Baker

== See also ==
- 1872 United States presidential election in Florida
- 1872 United States House of Representatives election in Florida
