= Walter Kehoe =

American politician

James Walter Kehoe
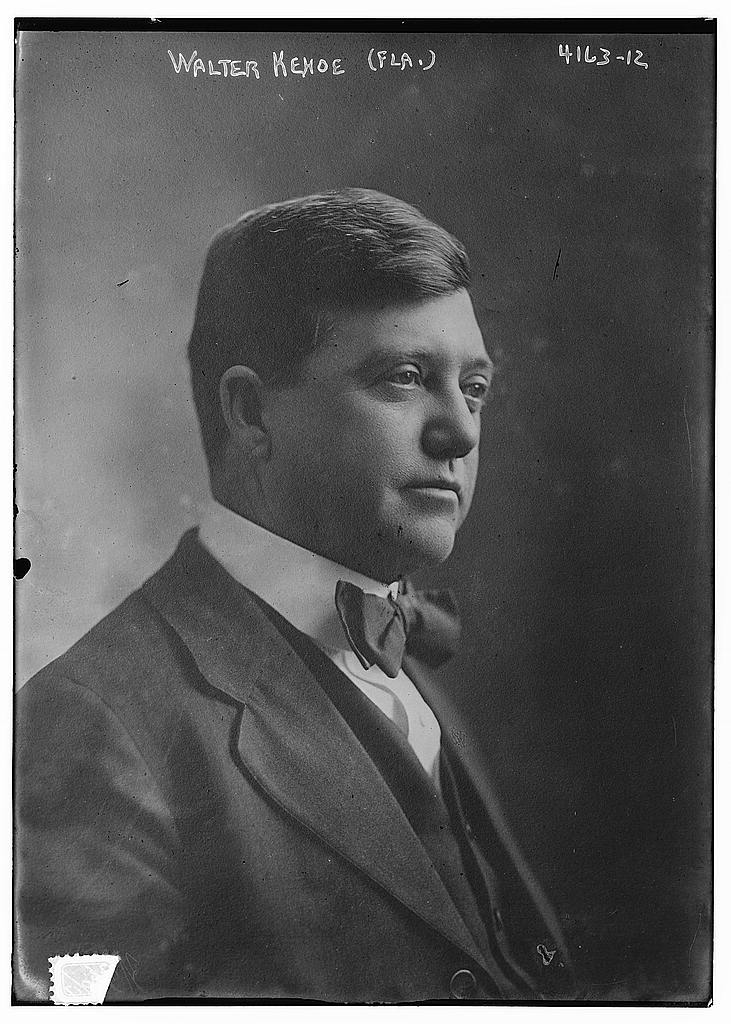

Member of the U.S. House of Representatives from Florida's 3rd district
- In office March 4, 1917 – March 3, 1919
- Preceded by: Emmett Wilson
- Succeeded by: John H. Smithwick

Personal details
- Born: John Walter Kehoe; April 25, 1870 Eufaula, Alabama, U.S.
- Died: August 20, 1938 (aged 68) Coral Gables, Florida, U.S.
- Resting place: Graceland Memorial Park, Miami, Florida
- Party: Democratic

James Walter Kehoe (April 25, 1870 – August 20, 1938) was a U.S. representative from Florida for one term from 1917 to 1919.

== Early life and education ==
Born in Eufaula, Alabama, Kehoe attended the common schools. He moved to Florida in 1883. He studied law. He was admitted to the bar in 1889 and, being a minor, was authorized by a special act of the State legislature to commence practice in Milton, Florida.

== Political career ==
=== State legislature ===
He served as a member of the State house of representatives in 1900 but resigned before the legislature convened. He served as a member of the Democratic congressional executive committee. State's attorney for the first judicial circuit of Florida 1900-1909.

=== Congress ===
Kehoe was elected as a Democrat to the Sixty-fifth Congress (March 4, 1917 – March 3, 1919). He was an unsuccessful candidate for reelection to the Sixty-sixth Congress in 1918. Again State's attorney from June 1925 until March 1926, when he resigned. He resumed the practice of law in Miami, Florida.

== Death ==
He died in Coral Gables, Florida, on August 20, 1938. He was interred in Graceland Park Cemetery, Miami, Florida.

U.S. House of Representatives
Preceded by Emmett Wilson	Member of the U.S. House of Representatives from Florida's 3rd congressional district 1917 – 1919	Succeeded by John H. Smithwick
