= 1876 United States House of Representatives elections in Florida =

United States House of Representatives elections in Florida, 1876
- November 7, 1876

Both of Florida's seats to the United States House of Representatives
	First party	Second party
Party	Democratic	Republican
Last election	0	2
Seats won	1	1
Seat change	▲1	▼1
Popular vote	24,733	24,139
Percentage	50.6%	49.4%

The 1876 United States House of Representatives elections in Florida were held on November 7 for the 45th Congress. These elections were held at the same time as the election for governor and the contentious presidential election, in which Florida was one of four states whose electoral votes were in dispute.

== Background ==
In the 1874 elections, both Republican incumbents were initially declared re-elected. In the 2nd district, Jesse J. Finley (D) successfully contested the re-election of Josiah T. Walls (R), so that at the time of the 1876 elections, Florida had one Democratic and one Republican incumbent.

== Election results ==
Both incumbents ran for re-election, and both were defeated. The 1st district changed from Republican to Democratic control while the 2nd changed from Democratic to Republican control, resulting in no net change

1876 United States House election results
District	Democratic			Republican		
1st	Robert H. M. Davidson	13,162	51.2%	William J. Purman (I)	12,565	48.8%
2nd	Jesse J. Finley (I)	11,571	50.0%	Horatio Bisbee, Jr.	11,574	50.0%

== Contested election ==
As in 1874, Democrat Jesse J. Finley challenged the results of the election in the 2nd district. On February 20, 1879, Finley was declared the legitimate winner with a vote of 11,329 - 11,077, and was seated in Bisbee's place, serving from February 20, 1879 - March 3, 1879 when the 45th Congress ended.

== See also ==
- United States House of Representatives elections, 1876
