= Emmett Wilson =

American politician (1882–1918)

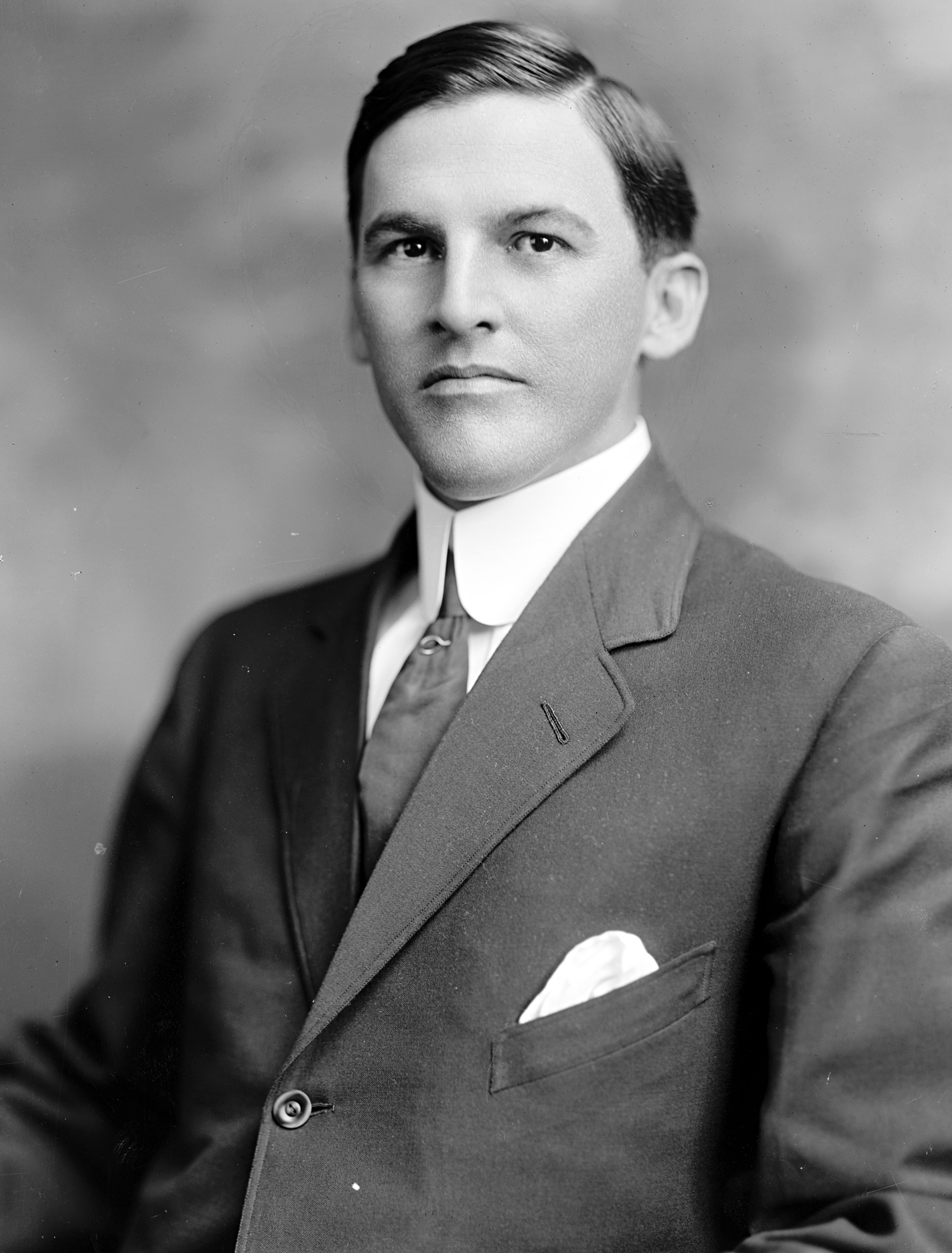

Member of the U.S. House of Representatives from Florida's 3rd district
- In office March 4, 1913 – March 3, 1917
- Preceded by: Dannite H. Mays
- Succeeded by: Walter Kehoe

Personal details
- Born: September 17, 1882 Belize City, British Honduras
- Died: May 29, 1918 (aged 35) Pensacola, Florida, U.S.
- Resting place: St. John’s Cemetery
- Party: Democratic

Emmett Wilson (September 17, 1882 – May 29, 1918) was an American lawyer and politician who served two terms as a United States representative from Florida from 1913 to 1917.

== Early life and education ==
He was the grandson of Augustus Emmett Maxwell. Wilson was born during the temporary residence of his parents at Belize City, British Honduras.

Wilson moved with his parents to Chipley, Florida, where he attended the public schools and Florida State College at Tallahassee, Florida.

== Career ==
He was employed as a railroad telegrapher and later as a stenographer and was graduated from the law department of the Stetson University at DeLand in 1904. Admitted to the bar the same year, he commenced practice in Marianna, Florida. He later moved to Pensacola, Florida, in 1906 and continued the practice of law.

Wilson was appointed assistant United States attorney for the northern district of Florida February 1, 1907, and United States attorney for the same district October 7, 1907. He held the position until March 1909.

He was the state’s attorney for the first judicial circuit of Florida from 1911 to 1913.

=== Congress ===
Wilson was elected as a Democrat to the Sixty-third and Sixty-fourth Congresses (March 4, 1913 – March 3, 1917). He was an unsuccessful candidate for renomination in 1916.

== Later career and death ==
After leaving Congress, he resumed the practice of law in Pensacola, Florida and died there in 1918.

He was buried in St. John’s Cemetery.

U.S. House of Representatives
Preceded by Dannite H. Mays	Member of the U.S. House of Representatives from Florida's 3rd congressional district 1913–1917	Succeeded by Walter Kehoe
