= 1872 United States presidential election in Florida =

- November 5, 1872
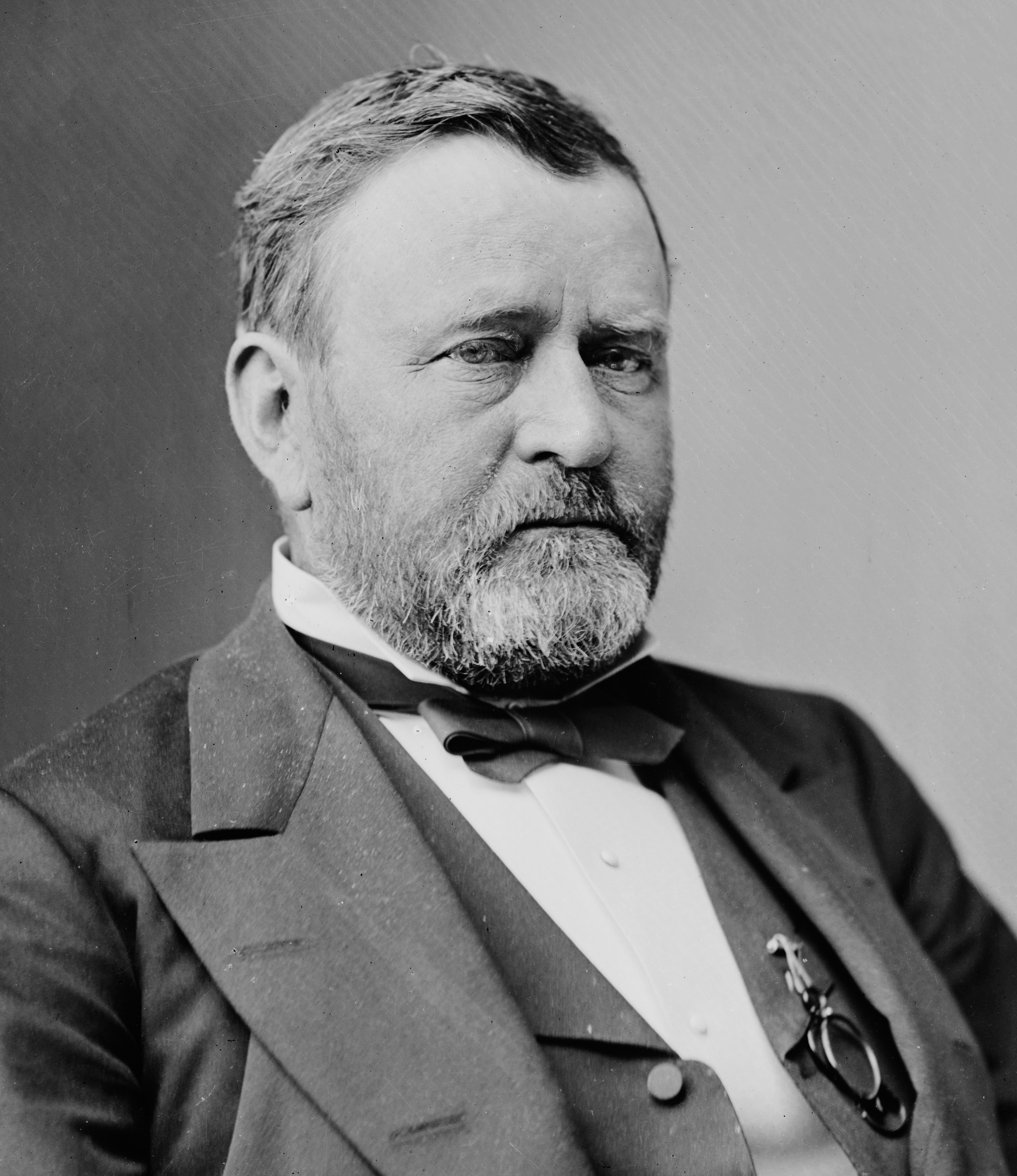

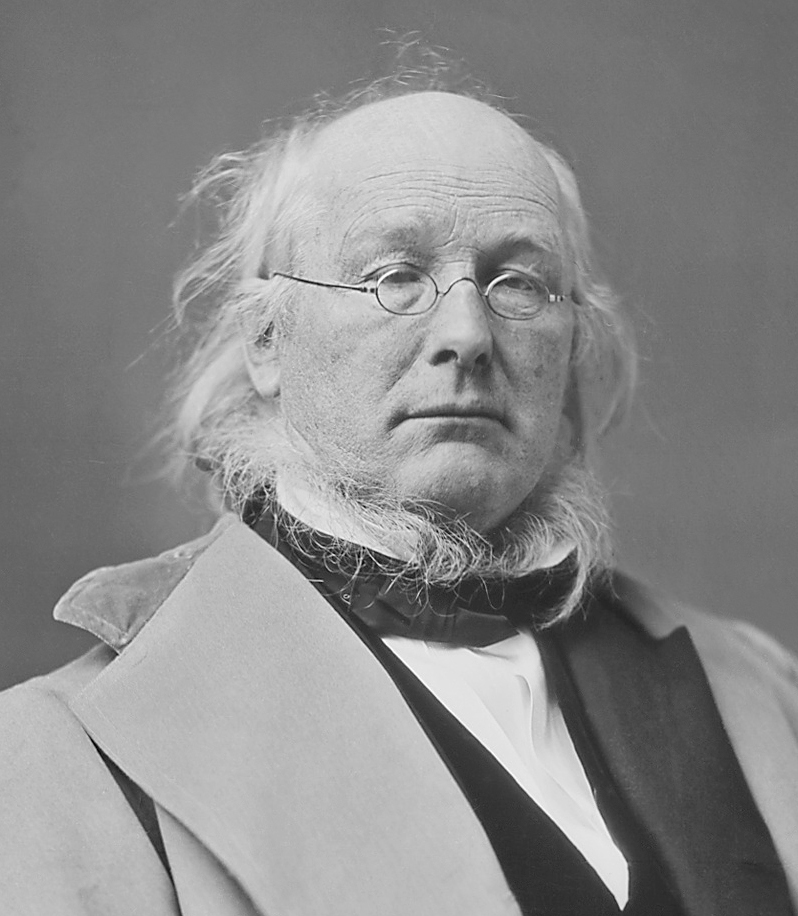
Nominee	Ulysses S. Grant	Horace Greeley
Party	Republican	Liberal Republican
Home state	Illinois	New York
Running mate	Henry Wilson	Benjamin G. Brown
Electoral vote	4	0
Popular vote	17,763	15,427
Percentage	53.52%	46.48%
County results
Grant
50–60%
60–70%
70–80%
Greeley
50–60%
60–70%
70–80%
80–90%
90–100%
Unknown
President before election
Ulysses S. Grant
Republican
Elected President
Ulysses S. Grant
Republican

The 1872 United States presidential election in Florida took place on November 5, 1872, as part of the 1872 United States presidential election. Voters chose four representatives, or electors to the Electoral College, who voted for president and vice president.

Florida voted for the Republican candidate, Ulysses S. Grant, over Liberal Republican candidate, Horace Greeley. Grant won the state by a margin of 7.04%.

== Results ==
1872 United States presidential election in Florida
Party	Candidate	Running mate	Popular vote		Electoral vote	
Party	Candidate	Running mate	Count	%	Count	%
Republican	Ulysses S. Grant of Illinois	Henry Wilson of Massachusetts	17,763	53.52%	4	100.00%
Liberal Republican	Horace Greeley of New York	Benjamin Gratz Brown of Missouri	15,427	46.48%	0	0.00%
Total			33,190	100.00%	4	100.00%

== See also ==
- United States presidential elections in Florida
- 1872 United States House of Representatives election in Florida
- 1872 Florida gubernatorial election
