= Aaronsburg Academy =

School in Aaronsburg, Pennsylvania, USA

Coordinates: 40.900°N 77.455°W

Aaronsburg Academy was a school in Aaronsburg, Centre County, Pennsylvania. T. J. Frederick helped establish the school. It opened in 1854 and closed in 1868.

Jonathan Rose Dimm served as principal in 1858. Daniel Fleisher served as principal in 1864 and 1865.

The school was attended by teachers.

== Alumni ==
- Luther Alexander Gotwald
- William J. Purman
