= Dannite Hill Mays =

American politician

Dannite H. Mays
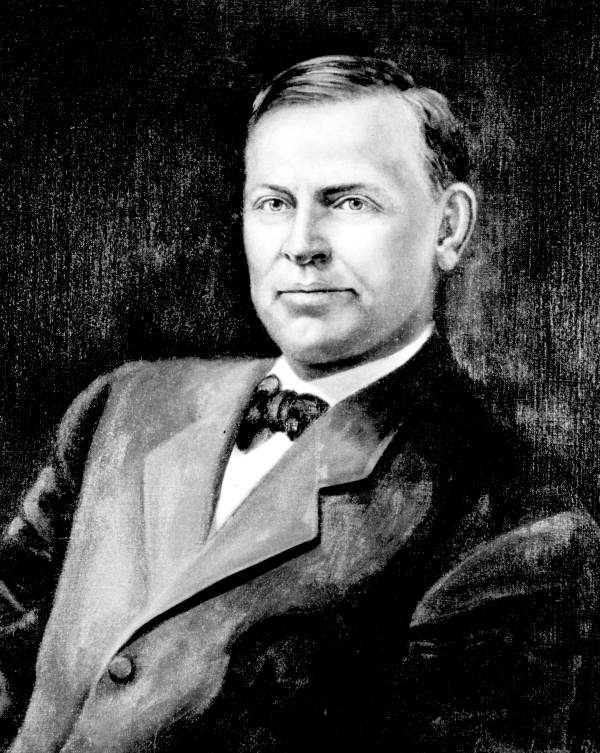

Member of the U.S. House of Representatives from Florida's 3rd district
- In office March 4, 1909 – March 3, 1913
- Preceded by: William B. Lamar
- Succeeded by: Emmett Wilson

Personal details
- Born: Dannite Hill Mays; April 28, 1852 Madison, Florida, U.S.
- Died: May 9, 1930 (aged 78) Monticello, Florida, U.S.
- Resting place: Roseland Cemetery
- Party: Democratic

Dannite Hill Mays (April 28, 1852 – May 9, 1930) was an American farmer and politician who served two terms as a U.S. representative from Florida from 1909 to 1913. He also served in the state legislature and was a candidate for governor.

== Early life and education ==
Born near Madison, Florida, Mays attended the county schools, the public schools of Savannah, Georgia, and Washington and Lee University, Lexington, Virginia. He moved to Monticello, Florida, and engaged in agricultural pursuits.

== Political career ==
He served as delegate to the Democratic State convention in 1888.

=== State legislature ===
He served as member of the State house of representatives in 1891, 1895, and 1897, serving as speaker in 1897.

He was an unsuccessful candidate for Governor in 1900 and 1904.

=== Congress ===
Mays was elected as a Democrat to the Sixty-first and Sixty-second Congresses (March 4, 1909 – March 3, 1913).

He was an unsuccessful candidate for renomination in 1912.

== Later career and death ==
He returned to Monticello, Florida, and resumed agricultural pursuits.

He died in Monticello, Florida, May 9, 1930. He was interred in Roseland Cemetery.

U.S. House of Representatives
Preceded by William B. Lamar	Member of the U.S. House of Representatives from Florida's 3rd congressional district 1909 – 1913	Succeeded by Emmett Wilson
