= Florida's 1st congressional district =

U.S. House district for Florida

Coordinates: 30°39′46″N 86°39′45″W

- Map of district boundaries since January 3, 2023 (Note: The district includes the same census blocks as drawn for the 2020 redistricting cycle in 2022 and during mid-decade redistricting in 2026. As such, boundaries of the district will not change at the 2026 elections.) (Interactive map version)
- Representative: Jimmy Patronis; R–Fort Walton Beach
- Area: 4,759 mi^{2} (12,330 km^{2})
- Distribution: 82.11% urban; 17.89% rural
- Population (2025): 827,335
- Median household income: $84,555
- Ethnicity: 69.4% White; 12.8% Black; 7.7% Hispanic; 6.1% Two or more races; 2.7% Asian; 1.2% other
- Cook PVI: R+18

Florida's 1st congressional district is a congressional district in the U.S. state of Florida, covering the state's western Panhandle. It includes all of Escambia, Okaloosa, Santa Rosa counties, and portions of Walton county. The district is anchored in Pensacola and also includes the large military bedroom communities and tourist destinations of Navarre and Fort Walton Beach and stretches along the Emerald Coast. The district was previously represented by Republican Matt Gaetz. With a Cook Partisan Voting Index rating of R+18, it is the most Republican district in Florida.

Due to the election to replace Matt Gaetz, who had resigned in 2024, the district held the 2025 special election between Jimmy Patronis (R) and Gay Valimont (D), Patronis was declared the winner shortly after polls closed. Although Valimont lost, she had flipped Escambia County, becoming the first Democrat to win the county since Earl Hutto in 1992. This was one of the two special elections on April 1, the other being in Florida's 6th congressional district.

The elections attracted national attention in 2025. According to a report by NBC News, the two Democratic candidates in these elections raised a combined $15.7 million as of March 21, 2025, and 75% of donations were in the range of $200 or less. According to FEC filings, Valimont raised 6.5 million dollars.

== Characteristics ==
The district encompasses the western part of the Florida Panhandle, in the extreme western portion of the state, stretching from Pensacola and the Alabama border east including all of Escambia, Santa Rosa, and Okaloosa Counties and the western 2/3 of Walton County .

Most of the territory now in the 1st District had been the 3rd District from 1903 to 1963; however, it has been numbered as the 1st District since then. It cast aside its Democratic roots far sooner than most of the other areas of the state. It has not supported a Democrat for president since John F. Kennedy in 1960. In 1964, Republican Barry Goldwater carried the district by such a large margin that it nearly pushed Florida's electoral votes into the Republican column. It has continued to vote for Republicans by very wide margins, with the only exception being 1976, where Gerald Ford won a narrow 50–49 victory over Jimmy Carter. Nonetheless, it usually continued to elect conservative Democrats at the state and local level, even in years when Republican presidential candidates won the district handily. Well into the 1980s, the district's congressmen and state lawmakers only faced "sacrificial lamb" Republican challengers on the occasions they faced any opposition at all. For example, Democratic incumbent Earl Hutto was unopposed for reelection in 1984 even as Ronald Reagan won the district with over 70 percent of the vote. As late as 1992, Democratic senator Bob Graham easily carried the district with 54 percent of the vote—more than double Bill Clinton's total in the district.

This changed with the Republican Revolution of 1994. That year, Joe Scarborough became the first Republican to represent the Panhandle since Reconstruction. This change was more a result of eight-term incumbent Hutto retiring than of a Republican upsurge. It had been taken for granted that Hutto would be succeeded by a Republican once he retired, particularly after he was nearly defeated in 1990 and 1992. Republicans had also swept most of the district's overlapping state legislative seats. It is currently considered the most Republican district in Florida, and no Democratic candidate had gotten over 40% of the vote between Hutto's retirement and its 2025 special election. John McCain received 67% of the vote in this district in 2008, and Mitt Romney and Donald Trump respectively carried it by similar margins in 2012 and 2016.

The district's conservatism is not limited to national politics. Since 1994, Republicans have dominated elections at the state and local levels. Graham is the last Democrat to have won it in a statewide race. In much of the district, there are now no elected Democrats above the county level.

The area comprising the 1st District has maintained a large military presence ever since John Quincy Adams persuaded Spain to sell Florida to the United States in 1819, in part to gain a deepwater port at Pensacola. The U.S. Air Force also has a large presence in Eglin Air Force Base, which is economically important to the district. Slightly under 14,000 people are employed at the base, which is one of the largest air bases in the world and has approximately 100,000 square miles (260,000 km^{2}) of airspace stretching over the Gulf of Mexico to the Florida Keys. Hurlburt Field is an auxiliary field at Eglin AFB and is the location of the Air Force Special Operations Command. Eglin AFB spreads over three counties. Pensacola Naval Air Station was the first Navy base devoted to the specific purpose of aviation, and is the home of the Blue Angels. Saufley Field, used for training, is slightly north of Pensacola NAS.

A large number of veterans who retire relocate to this district. Tourism, particularly in Navarre, Pensacola Beach, and Destin, is a major economic activity.

== Recent statewide election results ==
Year	Office	Results
2008	President	McCain 67% - 32%
2010	Senate	Rubio 65% - 13%
2010	Governor	Scott 68% - 32%
2010	Attorney General	Bondi 68% - 25%
2010	Chief Financial Officer	Atwater 68% - 25%
2012	President	Romney 69% - 31%
2012	Senate	Mack IV 63% - 37%
2014	Governor	Scott 73% - 27%
2016	President	Trump 66% - 28%
2016	Senate	Rubio 70% - 26%
2018	Senate	Scott 67% - 32%
2018	Governor	DeSantis 67% - 32%
2018	Attorney General	Moody 69% - 29%
2018	Chief Financial Officer	Patronis 69% - 31%
2020	President	Trump 65% - 33%
2022	Senate	Rubio 72% - 27%
2022	Governor	DeSantis 73% - 26%
2022	Attorney General	Moody 74% - 26%
2022	Chief Financial Officer	Patronis 73% - 27%
2024	President	Trump 68% - 31%
2024	Senate	Scott 69% - 29%

== Composition ==
For the 118th and successive Congresses (based on redistricting following the 2020 census), the district contains all or portions of the following counties and communities:

Escambia County (13)

All 13 communities

Okaloosa County (14)

All 14 communities

Santa Rosa County (33)

All 33 communities

Walton County (3)

Freeport, Miramar Beach, Paxton

== List of members representing the district ==
Member (Residence)	Party	Years	Cong ress	Electoral history	District location
District created March 4, 1875
William J. Purman (Tallahassee)	Republican	March 4, 1875 – March 3, 1877	44th	Elected in 1874. Lost re-election.	1875-1883 [data missing]
Robert H. M. Davidson (Quincy)	Democratic	March 4, 1877 – March 3, 1891	45th 46th 47th 48th 49th 50th 51st	Elected in 1876. Re-elected in 1878. Re-elected in 1880. Re-elected in 1882. Re-elected in 1884. Re-elected in 1886. Re-elected in 1888. Lost re-election.	1875-1883 [data missing]
Robert H. M. Davidson (Quincy)	Democratic	March 4, 1877 – March 3, 1891	45th 46th 47th 48th 49th 50th 51st	Elected in 1876. Re-elected in 1878. Re-elected in 1880. Re-elected in 1882. Re-elected in 1884. Re-elected in 1886. Re-elected in 1888. Lost re-election.	1883-1893 [data missing]
Stephen R. Mallory (Pensacola)	Democratic	March 4, 1891 – March 3, 1895	52nd 53rd	Elected in 1890. Re-elected in 1892. Retired.	1883-1893 [data missing]
Stephen R. Mallory (Pensacola)	Democratic	March 4, 1891 – March 3, 1895	52nd 53rd	Elected in 1890. Re-elected in 1892. Retired.	1893-1903 [data missing]
Stephen M. Sparkman (Tampa)	Democratic	March 4, 1895 – March 3, 1917	54th 55th 56th 57th 58th 59th 60th 61st 62nd 63rd 64th	Elected in 1894. Re-elected in 1896. Re-elected in 1898. Re-elected in 1900. Re-elected in 1902. Re-elected in 1904. Re-elected in 1906. Re-elected in 1908. Re-elected in 1910. Re-elected in 1912. Re-elected in 1914. Retired.	1893-1903 [data missing]
Stephen M. Sparkman (Tampa)	Democratic	March 4, 1895 – March 3, 1917	54th 55th 56th 57th 58th 59th 60th 61st 62nd 63rd 64th	Elected in 1894. Re-elected in 1896. Re-elected in 1898. Re-elected in 1900. Re-elected in 1902. Re-elected in 1904. Re-elected in 1906. Re-elected in 1908. Re-elected in 1910. Re-elected in 1912. Re-elected in 1914. Retired.	1903-1913 [data missing]
Stephen M. Sparkman (Tampa)	Democratic	March 4, 1895 – March 3, 1917	54th 55th 56th 57th 58th 59th 60th 61st 62nd 63rd 64th	Elected in 1894. Re-elected in 1896. Re-elected in 1898. Re-elected in 1900. Re-elected in 1902. Re-elected in 1904. Re-elected in 1906. Re-elected in 1908. Re-elected in 1910. Re-elected in 1912. Re-elected in 1914. Retired.	1913-1933 [data missing]
Herbert J. Drane (Lakeland)	Democratic	March 4, 1917 – March 3, 1933	65th 66th 67th 68th 69th 70th 71st 72nd	Elected in 1916. Re-elected in 1918. Re-elected in 1920. Re-elected in 1922. Re-elected in 1924. Re-elected in 1926. Re-elected in 1928. Re-elected in 1930. Lost renomination.	1913-1933 [data missing]
J. Hardin Peterson (Lakeland)	Democratic	March 4, 1933 – January 3, 1951	73rd 74th 75th 76th 77th 78th 79th 80th 81st	Elected in 1932. Re-elected in 1934. Re-elected in 1936. Re-elected in 1938. Re-elected in 1940. Re-elected in 1942. Re-elected in 1944. Re-elected in 1946. Re-elected in 1948. Retired.	1933-1943 [data missing]
J. Hardin Peterson (Lakeland)	Democratic	March 4, 1933 – January 3, 1951	73rd 74th 75th 76th 77th 78th 79th 80th 81st	Elected in 1932. Re-elected in 1934. Re-elected in 1936. Re-elected in 1938. Re-elected in 1940. Re-elected in 1942. Re-elected in 1944. Re-elected in 1946. Re-elected in 1948. Retired.	1943-1953 [data missing]
Chester B. McMullen (Clearwater)	Democratic	January 3, 1951 – January 3, 1953	82nd	Elected in 1950. Retired.	1943-1953 [data missing]
Courtney W. Campbell (Clearwater)	Democratic	January 3, 1953 – January 3, 1955	83rd	Elected in 1952. Lost re-election.	1953-1963 [data missing]
William C. Cramer (St. Petersburg)	Republican	January 3, 1955 – January 3, 1963	84th 85th 86th 87th	Elected in 1954. Re-elected in 1956. Re-elected in 1958. Re-elected in 1960. Redistricted to the 12th district.	1953-1963 [data missing]
Bob Sikes (Crestview)	Democratic	January 3, 1963 – January 3, 1979	88th 89th 90th 91st 92nd 93rd 94th 95th	Redistricted from the 3rd district and re-elected in 1962. Re-elected in 1964. Re-elected in 1966. Re-elected in 1968. Re-elected in 1970. Re-elected in 1972. Re-elected in 1974. Re-elected in 1976. Retired.	1963-1973 [data missing]
Bob Sikes (Crestview)	Democratic	January 3, 1963 – January 3, 1979	88th 89th 90th 91st 92nd 93rd 94th 95th	Redistricted from the 3rd district and re-elected in 1962. Re-elected in 1964. Re-elected in 1966. Re-elected in 1968. Re-elected in 1970. Re-elected in 1972. Re-elected in 1974. Re-elected in 1976. Retired.	1973-1983 [data missing]
Earl Hutto (Pensacola)	Democratic	January 3, 1979 – January 3, 1995	96th 97th 98th 99th 100th 101st 102nd 103rd	Elected in 1978. Re-elected in 1980. Re-elected in 1982. Re-elected in 1984. Re-elected in 1986. Re-elected in 1988. Re-elected in 1990. Re-elected in 1992. Retired.	1973-1983 [data missing]
Earl Hutto (Pensacola)	Democratic	January 3, 1979 – January 3, 1995	96th 97th 98th 99th 100th 101st 102nd 103rd	Elected in 1978. Re-elected in 1980. Re-elected in 1982. Re-elected in 1984. Re-elected in 1986. Re-elected in 1988. Re-elected in 1990. Re-elected in 1992. Retired.	1983-1993 [data missing]
Earl Hutto (Pensacola)	Democratic	January 3, 1979 – January 3, 1995	96th 97th 98th 99th 100th 101st 102nd 103rd	Elected in 1978. Re-elected in 1980. Re-elected in 1982. Re-elected in 1984. Re-elected in 1986. Re-elected in 1988. Re-elected in 1990. Re-elected in 1992. Retired.	1993-2003 [data missing]
Joe Scarborough (Pensacola)	Republican	January 3, 1995 – September 5, 2001	104th 105th 106th 107th	Elected in 1994. Re-elected in 1996. Re-elected in 1998. Re-elected in 2000. Resigned.	1993-2003 [data missing]
Vacant		September 5, 2001 – October 16, 2001	107th		1993-2003 [data missing]
Jeff Miller (Chumuckla)	Republican	October 16, 2001 – January 3, 2017	107th 108th 109th 110th 111th 112th 113th 114th	Elected to finish Scarborough's term. Re-elected in 2002. Re-elected in 2004. Re-elected in 2006. Re-elected in 2008. Re-elected in 2010. Re-elected in 2012. Re-elected in 2014. Retired.	1993-2003 [data missing]
Jeff Miller (Chumuckla)	Republican	October 16, 2001 – January 3, 2017	107th 108th 109th 110th 111th 112th 113th 114th	Elected to finish Scarborough's term. Re-elected in 2002. Re-elected in 2004. Re-elected in 2006. Re-elected in 2008. Re-elected in 2010. Re-elected in 2012. Re-elected in 2014. Retired.	2003-2013
Jeff Miller (Chumuckla)	Republican	October 16, 2001 – January 3, 2017	107th 108th 109th 110th 111th 112th 113th 114th	Elected to finish Scarborough's term. Re-elected in 2002. Re-elected in 2004. Re-elected in 2006. Re-elected in 2008. Re-elected in 2010. Re-elected in 2012. Re-elected in 2014. Retired.	2013–2023
Matt Gaetz (Niceville)	Republican	January 3, 2017 – November 13, 2024	115th 116th 117th 118th	Elected in 2016. Re-elected in 2018. Re-elected in 2020. Re-elected in 2022. Re-elected in 2024, but resigned in expectation of nomination as US Attorney General.	2013–2023
Matt Gaetz (Niceville)	Republican	January 3, 2017 – November 13, 2024	115th 116th 117th 118th	Elected in 2016. Re-elected in 2018. Re-elected in 2020. Re-elected in 2022. Re-elected in 2024, but resigned in expectation of nomination as US Attorney General.	2023–present
Vacant		November 13, 2024 – April 2, 2025	118th 119th	Gaetz withdrew from consideration as Attorney General but declined to be seated.	2023–present
Jimmy Patronis (Fort Walton Beach)	Republican	April 2, 2025 – present	119th	Elected to finish Gaetz's term. Re-elected in 2026.	2023–present

== Recent election results ==
=== 2001 (special) ===
Florida's 1st congressional district special election, 2001
Party	Candidate	Votes	%
Republican	Jeff Miller	53,547	65.68
Democratic	Steve Briese	22,695	27.99
Independent	John G. Ralls Jr.	5,115	6.31
Write-ins		14	0.02
Total votes		81,071	100.00
Republican hold			

=== 2002 ===
Florida's 1st Congressional District election (2002)
Party	Candidate	Votes	%
Republican	Jeff Miller (incumbent)	152,635	75%
Democratic	Bert Oram	51,972	25%
No party	Others	19	0.01
Total votes		204,626	100%
Turnout			
Republican hold			

=== 2004 ===
Florida's 1st Congressional District election (2004)
Party	Candidate	Votes	%
Republican	Jeff Miller (incumbent)	236,604	77%
Democratic	Mark S. Coutu	72,506	23%
Total votes		309,110	100%
Turnout			
Republican hold			

=== 2006 ===
Florida's 1st Congressional District election (2006)
Party	Candidate	Votes	%
Republican	Jeff Miller (incumbent)	135,786	69%
No party	Joe Roberts	62,340	31%
Total votes		198,126	100%
Turnout			
Republican hold			

=== 2008 ===
Florida's 1st Congressional District election (2008)
Party	Candidate	Votes	%
Republican	Jeff Miller (incumbent)	232,559	70%
Democratic	James E. Bryan	98,797	30%
Total votes		331,356	100%
Turnout			
Republican hold			

=== 2010 ===
Florida's 1st Congressional District election (2010)
Party	Candidate	Votes	%
Republican	Jeff Miller (incumbent)	170,821	80%
Independent	Joe Cantrell	23,250	11%
Independent	John E. Krause	18,253	9%
No party	Others	1,202	0.56%
Total votes		213,526	100%
Turnout			
Republican hold			

=== 2012 ===
Florida's 1st Congressional District election (2012)
Party	Candidate	Votes	%
Republican	Jeff Miller (incumbent)	238,440	70%
Democratic	James E. Bryan	92,961	27%
Libertarian	Calen Fretts	11,176	3%
No party	William Cleave Drummond II	17	0.0%
Total votes		342,594	100%
Turnout			
Republican hold			

=== 2014 ===
Florida's 1st Congressional District election (2014)
Party	Candidate	Votes	%
Republican	Jeff Miller (incumbent)	165,086	70%
Democratic	James E. Bryan	54,976	23%
No party	Mark Wichern	15,281	7%
Total votes		235,343	100%
Turnout			
Republican hold			

=== 2016 ===
Florida's 1st Congressional District election (2016)
Party	Candidate	Votes	%
Republican	Matt Gaetz	255,107	69%
Democratic	Steven Specht	114,079	31%
Total votes		369,186	100%
Turnout			
Republican hold			

=== 2018 ===
Florida's 1st Congressional District election (2018)
Party	Candidate	Votes	%
Republican	Matt Gaetz (incumbent)	216,189	67.06%
Democratic	Jennifer M. Zimmerman	106,199	32.94%
Total votes		322,388	100%
Republican hold			

=== 2020 ===
2020 United States House of Representatives elections in Florida
Party	Candidate	Votes	%
Republican	Matt Gaetz (incumbent)	283,352	64.61%
Democratic	Phil Ehr	149,172	34.01%
Independent	Albert Oram	6,038	1.38%
Total votes		438,532	100.0
Republican hold			

=== 2022 ===
2022 United States House of Representatives elections in Florida
Party	Candidate	Votes	%
Republican	Matt Gaetz (incumbent)	197,349	67.86%
Democratic	Rebekah Jones	93,467	32.13%
Total votes		290,816	100.0
Republican hold			

=== 2024 ===
2024 United States House of Representatives elections in Florida
Party	Candidate	Votes	%
Republican	Matt Gaetz (incumbent)	274,023	66.00%
Democratic	Gay Valimont	140,881	34.0%
Total votes		414,904	100.0
Republican hold			

=== 2025 (Special) ===
Main Article: 2025 Florida's 1st congressional district special election

Florida's 1st Congressional District Election (Special)
Party	Candidate	Votes	%
Republican	Jimmy Patronis	97,335	56.91%
Democratic	Gay Valimont	72,304	42.28%
Total votes		169,639	100.0
Republican hold			

== Bibliography ==
- Martis, Kenneth C. (1989). The Historical Atlas of Political Parties in the United States Congress. New York: Macmillan Publishing Company.
- Martis, Kenneth C. (1982). The Historical Atlas of United States Congressional Districts. New York: Macmillan Publishing Company.
- Congressional Biographical Directory of the United States 1774–present
