= 1874 United States House of Representatives elections in Florida =

United States House of Representatives elections in Florida, 1874
- November 3, 1874

Both of Florida's seats to the United States House of Representatives
| | Majority party | Minority party |
|---|---|---|
| Party | Republican | Democratic |
| Last election | 2 | 0 |
| Seats won | 2 | 0 |
| Seat change | Steady | Steady |
| Popular vote | 18,267 | 16,796 |
| Percentage | 52.1% | 47.9% |

The 1874 United States House of Representatives elections in Florida were held on November 3 for the 44th Congress.

== Background ==
Florida gained a second seat after the 1870 census, but in 1872, both seats were elected at large. In 1874, Florida was divided, for the first time, into districts for the United States House of Representatives.

== Election results ==
1874 United States House election results
| District | Republican | | | Democratic | | |
|---|---|---|---|---|---|---|
| 1st | William J. Purman (I) | 9,710 | 53.0% | John Henderson | 8,618 | 47.0% |
| 2nd | Josiah T. Walls (I) | 8,557 | 51.1% | Jesse J. Finley | 8,178 | 48.9% |

== 1st District ==
United States House of Representatives election in Florida 1st congressional district, 1874
- November 3, 1874
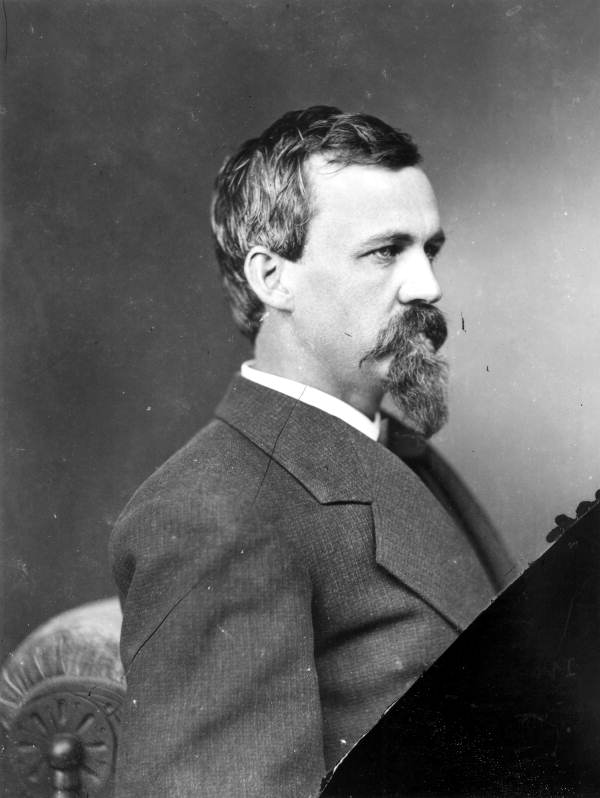

| Nominee | William J. Purman | John Henderson |
| Party | Republican | Democratic |
| Popular vote | 9,710 | 8,618 |
| Percentage | 52.98% | 47.02% |
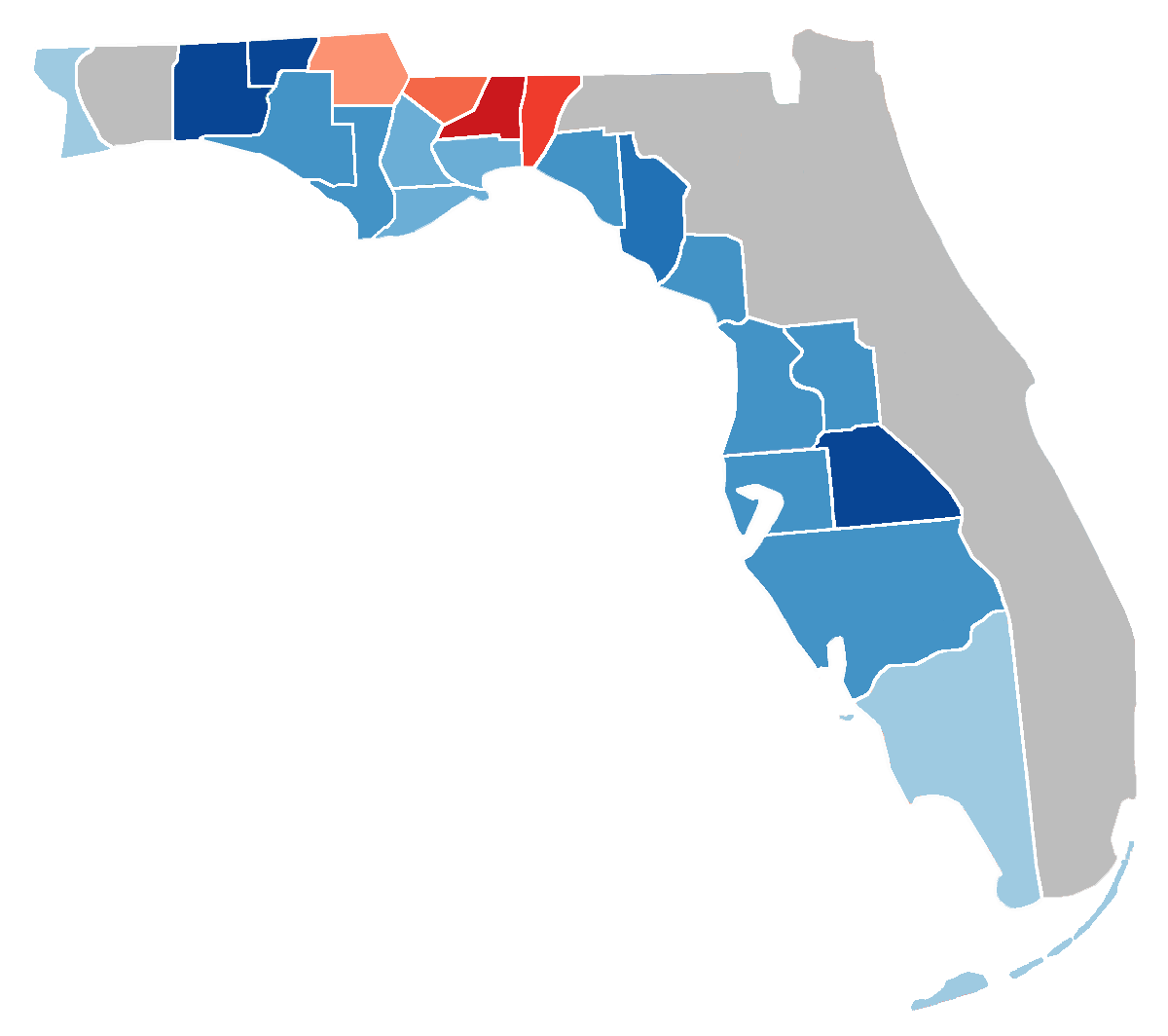
County Results
Purman
50–59%
60–69%
No Votes
Henderson
50–59%
60–69%
70–79%
80–89%
90–100%

1874 United States House election 1st District results
| Republican | | | Democratic | | |
|---|---|---|---|---|---|
| William J. Purman | 9,710 | 52.98% | John Henderson | 8,618 | 47.02% |

=== Results ===
| County | William J. Purman Republican | | John Henderson Democratic | | Total votes |
| County | # | % | # | % | Total votes |
|---|---|---|---|---|---|
| Calhoun | 41 | 23.43% | 134 | 76.57% | 175 |
| Escambia | 980 | 46.64% | 1,121 | 53.36% | 2,101 |
| Franklin | 87 | 35.22% | 160 | 64.78% | 247 |
| Gadsden | 1,160 | 64.44% | 640 | 35.56% | 1,800 |
| Hernando | 153 | 29.82% | 360 | 70.18% | 513 |
| Hillsborough | 142 | 25.40% | 417 | 74.60% | 559 |
| Holmes | 8 | 3.07% | 253 | 96.93% | 261 |
| Jackson | 1,256 | 58.34% | 897 | 41.66% | 2,153 |
| Jefferson | 2,020 | 77.10% | 600 | 22.90% | 2,620 |
| Lafayette | 53 | 19.70% | 216 | 80.30% | 269 |
| Leon | 2,395 | 82.84% | 496 | 17.16% | 2,891 |
| Levy | 139 | 26.48% | 386 | 73.52% | 525 |
| Liberty | 76 | 36.54% | 132 | 63.46% | 208 |
| Manatee | 77 | 23.62% | 249 | 76.38% | 326 |
| Monroe | 657 | 49.55% | 669 | 50.45% | 1,326 |
| Polk | 5 | 1.46% | 338 | 98.54% | 343 |
| Santa Rosa* | 0 | 0% | 0 | 0% | 0 |
| Sumter | 124 | 25.41% | 364 | 74.59% | 488 |
| Taylor | 58 | 25.66% | 168 | 74.34% | 226 |
| Wakulla | 144 | 35.73% | 259 | 64.27% | 403 |
| Walton | 45 | 9.0% | 455 | 91.0% | 500 |
| Washington | 83 | 21.45% | 304 | 78.55% | 387 |
| Actual Totals | 9,703 | 52.96% | 8,618 | 47.04% | 18,321 |
| Official Total | 9,710 | 52.98% | 8,618 | 47.02% | 18,328 |
*Votes was rejected by State Board Canvass

== 2nd District ==
United States House of Representatives election in Florida 2nd congressional district, 1874
- November 3, 1874
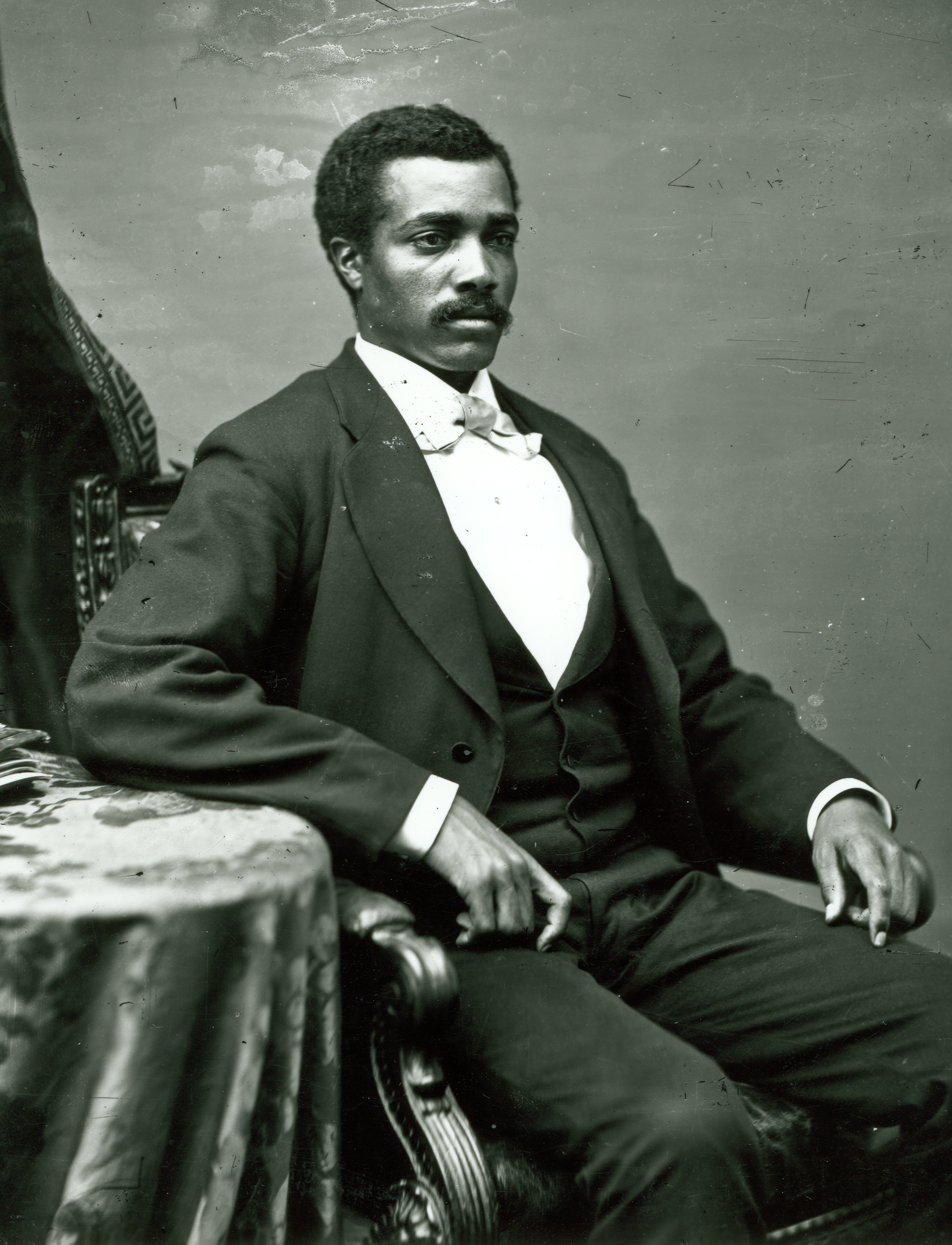

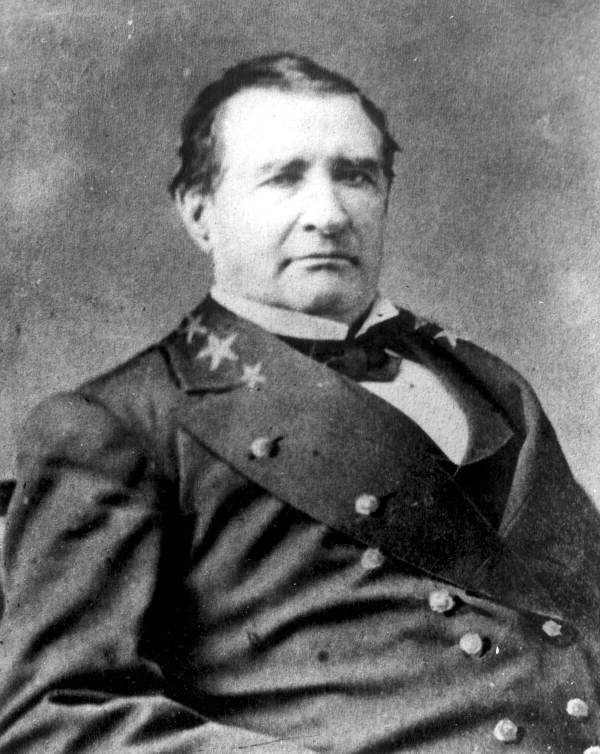
| Nominee | Josiah T. Walls | Jesse J. Finley |
| Party | Republican | Democratic |
| Popular vote | 8,549 | 8,178 |
| Percentage | 51.11% | 48.89% |
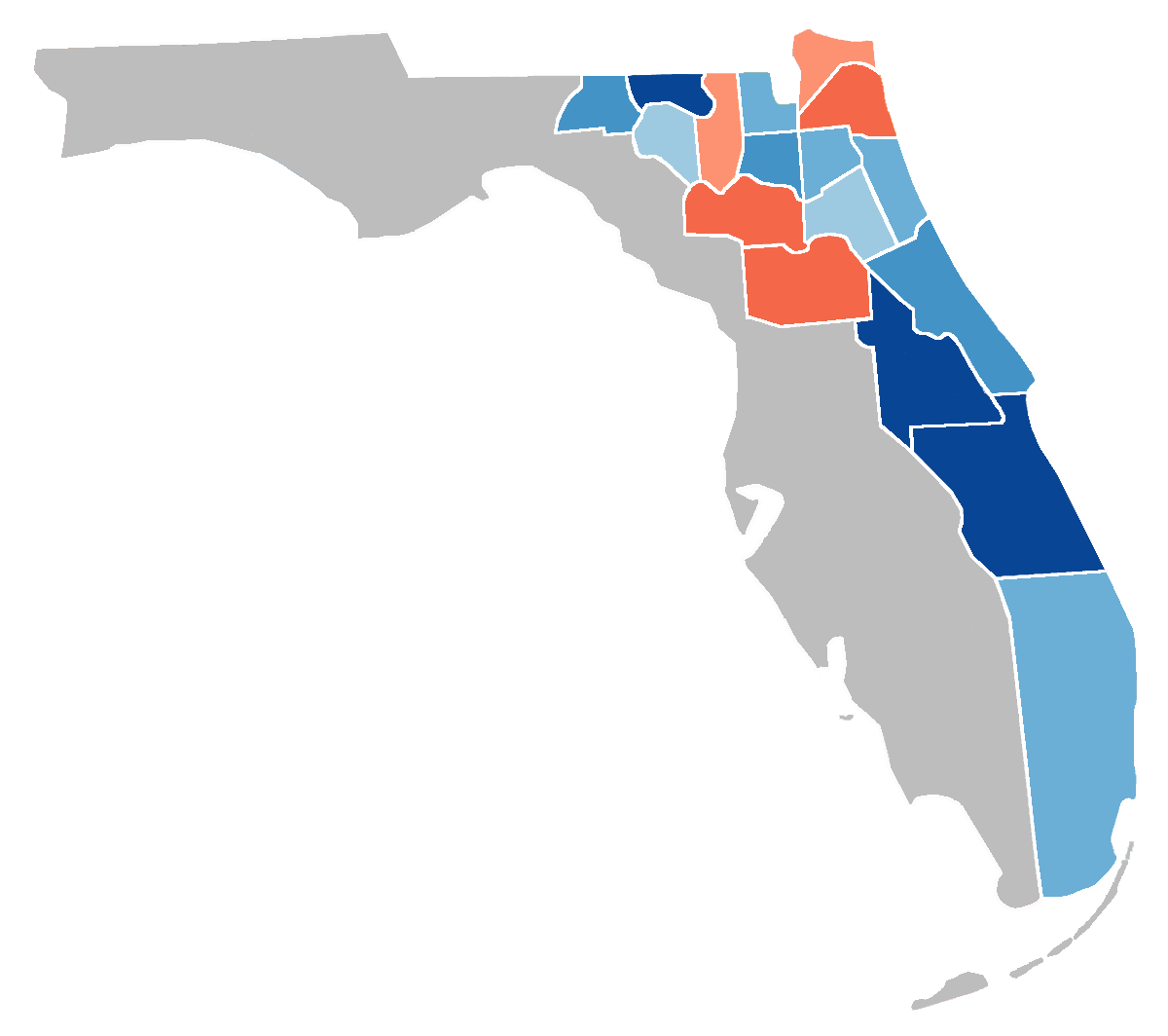
County Results
Walls
50–59%
60–69%
Finley
50–59%
60–69%
70–79%
80–89%
90–100%

1874 United States House election 2nd District results
| Republican | | | Democratic | | |
|---|---|---|---|---|---|
| Josiah T. Walls | 8,549 | 51.11% | Jesse J. Finley | 8,178 | 48.89% |

=== Results ===
| County | Josiah T. Walls Republican | | Jesse J. Finley Democratic | | Total votes |
| County | # | % | # | % | Total votes |
|---|---|---|---|---|---|
| Alachua | 1,567 | 67.49% | 756 | 32.54% | 2,323 |
| Baker | 134 | 36.41% | 234 | 63.59% | 368 |
| Bradford | 181 | 26.23% | 509 | 73.77% | 690 |
| Brevard | 5 | 5.68% | 83 | 94.32% | 88 |
| Clay | 102 | 33.77% | 200 | 66.23% | 302 |
| Columbia | 714 | 51.37% | 676 | 48.63% | 1,390 |
| Dade | 12 | 34.29% | 23 | 65.71% | 35 |
| Duval | 1,375 | 60.18% | 910 | 39.82% | 2,285 |
| Hamilton | 231 | 29.58% | 550 | 70.42% | 781 |
| Madison | 1,308 | 60.92% | 839 | 39.08% | 2,147 |
| Marion | 1,072 | 63.81% | 608 | 36.19% | 1,680 |
| Nassau | 665 | 55.42% | 535 | 44.58% | 1,200 |
| Orange | 51 | 7.79% | 604 | 92.21% | 655 |
| Putnam | 451 | 47.88% | 491 | 52.12% | 942 |
| St. Johns | 208 | 32.15% | 439 | 67.85% | 647 |
| Suwannee | 393 | 47.35% | 437 | 67.85% | 830 |
| Volusia | 80 | 21.98% | 284 | 78.02% | 364 |
| Totals | 8,549 | 51.11% | 8,178 | 48.89% | 16,727 |

== Contested election ==
United States House of Representatives election in Florida 2nd congressional district, 1876 recount
- April 19, 1876
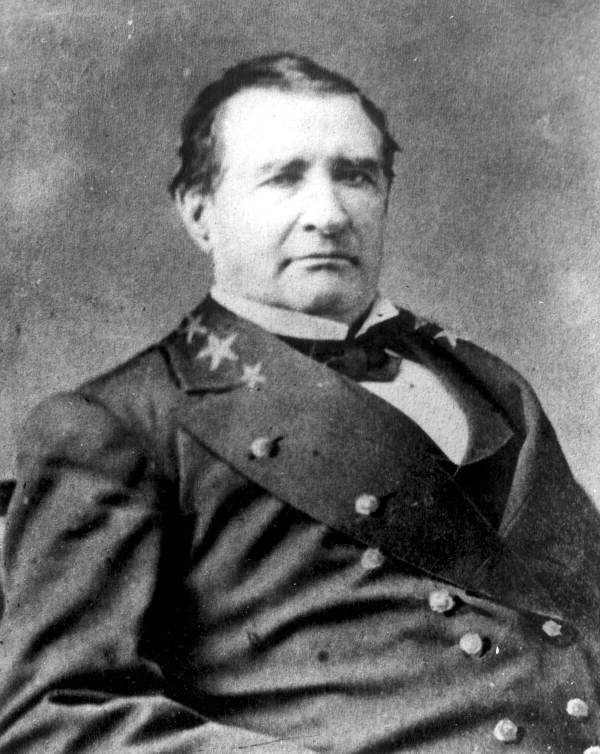

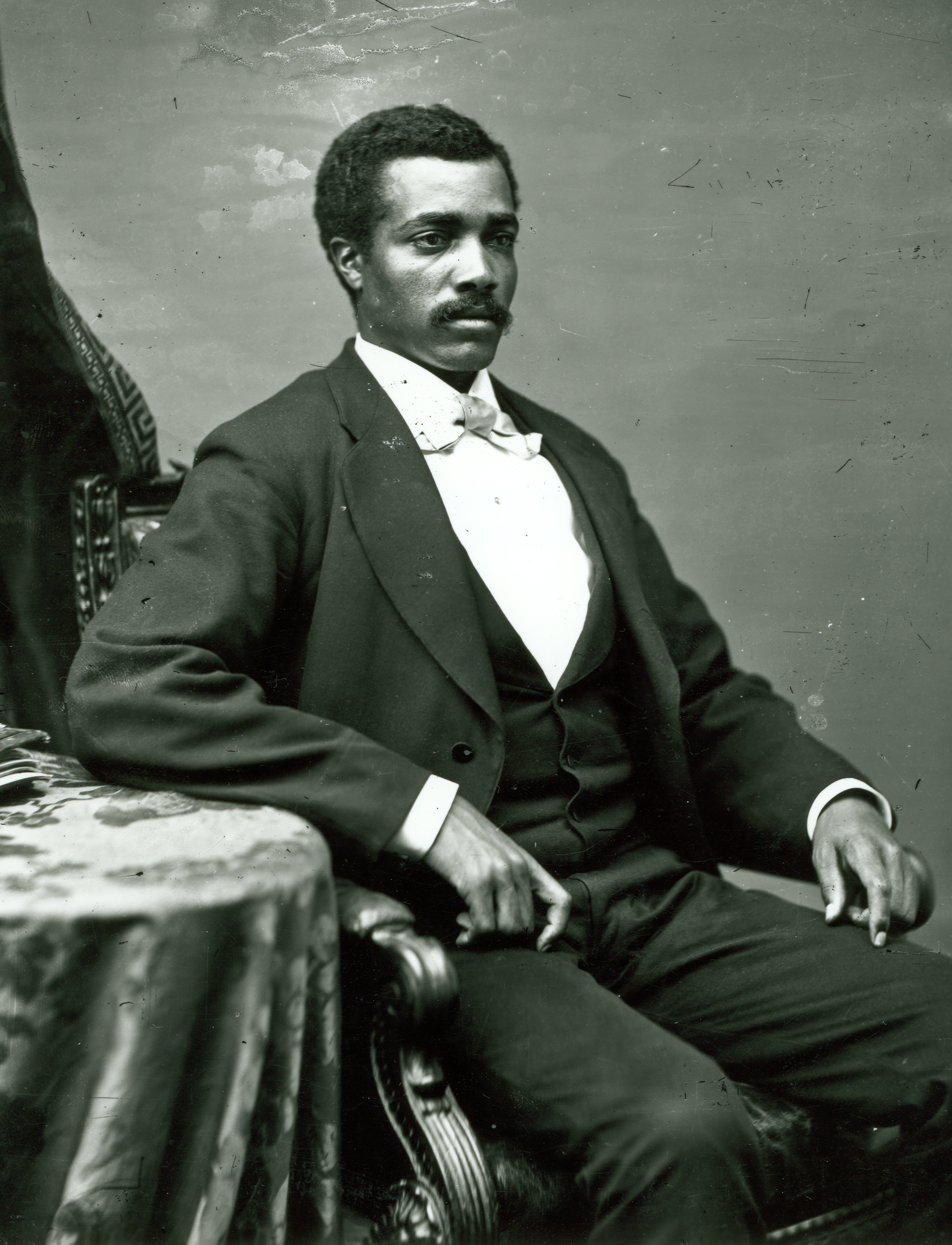
| Nominee | Jesse J. Finley | Josiah T. Walls |
| Party | Democratic | Republican |
| Popular vote | 8,147 | 7,804 |
| Percentage | 51.08% | 48.92% |
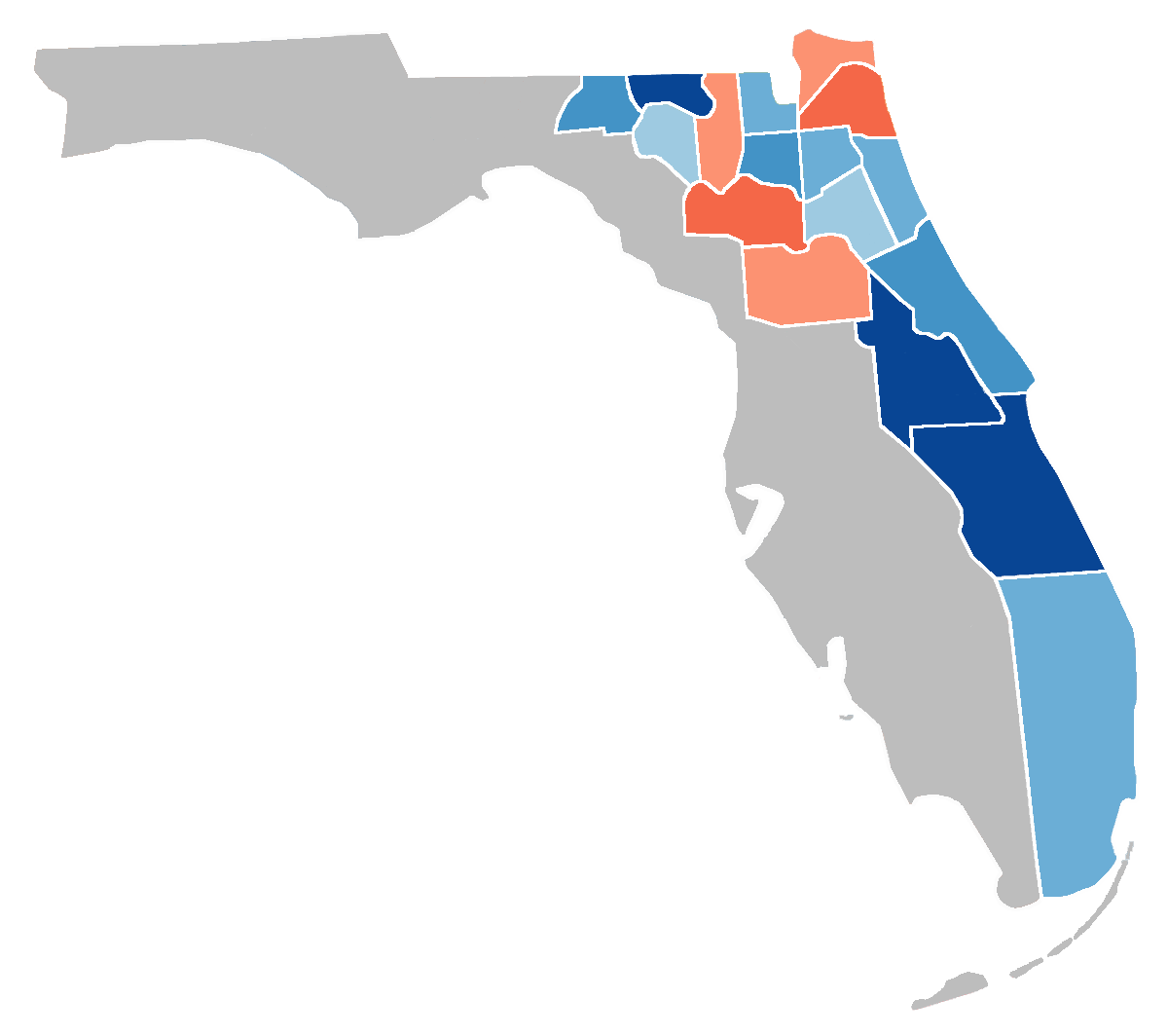
County Results
Finley
50–59%
60–69%
70–79%
80–89%
90–100%
Walls
50–59%
60–69%

In the 2nd district, Democrat Jesse J. Finley challenged Walls' re-election. On April 19, 1876, Finley was declared the winner of the election in the 2nd district and was seated in Congress.

1874 United States House election 2nd District results recount
| Republican | | | Democratic | | |
|---|---|---|---|---|---|
| Josiah T. Walls | 7,804 | 48.92% | Jesse J. Finley | 8,147 | 51.08% |

=== Results ===
| County | Josiah T. Walls Republican | | Jesse J. Finley Democratic | | Total votes |
| County | # | % | # | % | Total votes |
|---|---|---|---|---|---|
| Alachua | 822 | 53.14% | 725 | 46.86% | 1,547 |
| Baker | 134 | 36.41% | 234 | 63.59% | 368 |
| Bradford | 181 | 26.23% | 509 | 73.77% | 690 |
| Brevard | 5 | 5.68% | 83 | 94.32% | 88 |
| Clay | 102 | 33.77% | 200 | 66.23% | 302 |
| Columbia | 714 | 51.37% | 676 | 48.63% | 1,390 |
| Dade | 12 | 34.29% | 23 | 65.71% | 35 |
| Duval | 1,375 | 60.18% | 910 | 39.82% | 2,285 |
| Hamilton | 231 | 29.58% | 550 | 70.42% | 781 |
| Madison | 1,308 | 60.92% | 839 | 39.08% | 2,147 |
| Marion | 1,072 | 63.81% | 608 | 36.19% | 1,680 |
| Nassau | 665 | 55.42% | 535 | 44.58% | 1,200 |
| Orange | 51 | 7.79% | 604 | 92.21% | 655 |
| Putnam | 451 | 47.88% | 491 | 52.12% | 942 |
| St. Johns | 208 | 32.15% | 439 | 67.85% | 647 |
| Suwannee | 393 | 47.35% | 437 | 67.85% | 830 |
| Volusia | 80 | 21.98% | 284 | 78.02% | 364 |
| Totals | 7,804 | 48.92% | 8,147 | 51.08% | 15,951 |

== See also ==
- United States House of Representatives elections, 1874
