= William Bailey Lamar =

American politician

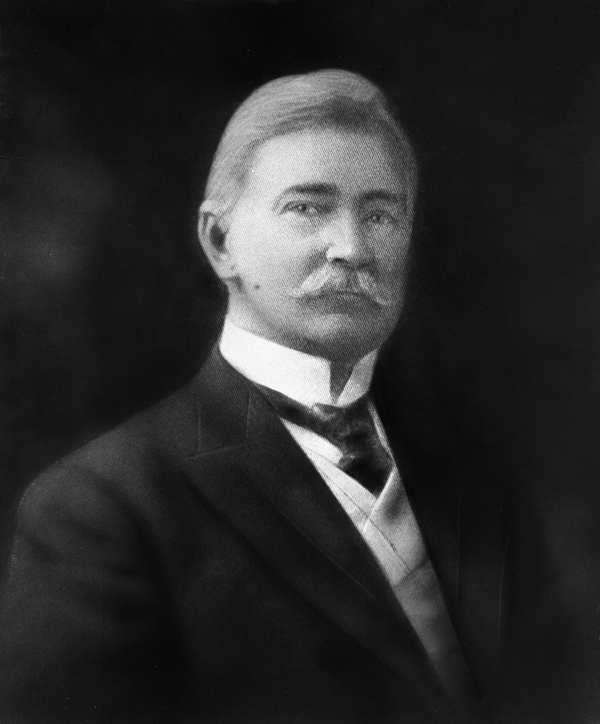

Member of the U.S. House of Representatives from Florida's 3rd district
- In office March 4, 1903 – March 3, 1909
- Preceded by: District established
- Succeeded by: Dannite H. Mays

16th Florida Attorney General
- In office January 8, 1889 – March 4, 1903
- Governor: Francis P. Fleming; Henry L. Mitchell; William D. Bloxham; William Sherman Jennings
- Preceded by: Charles Merian Cooper
- Succeeded by: James B. Whitfield

Member of the Florida House of Representatives from the Jefferson district
- In office 1886 – January 8, 1889

Personal details
- Born: June 12, 1853 Monticello, Florida, US
- Died: September 26, 1928 (aged 75) Thomasville, Georgia, US
- Party: Democratic
- Spouse: Ethel Healey (m. 1904)
- Education: Jefferson Academy; University of Georgia; Cumberland University
- Occupation: Attorney

William Bailey Lamar (June 12, 1853 – September 26, 1928) was an American attorney and politician who served as a U.S. representative from Florida from 1903 to 1909.

== Early life and education ==
Lamar was born on June 12, 1853, in Monticello, Florida. He was a member of the Lamar family, a political family from Georgia. Lamar attended Jefferson Academy in Monticello, and later went on to attend the University of Georgia. He lived in Athens, Georgia, from 1866 until 1873, when he began attending Cumberland University's law school in Lebanon, Tennessee, graduating in 1875.

That same year, Lamar was admitted into the Mississippi Bar and began a private practice in Tupelo, Mississippi.

== Political career ==
In 1877, Lamar returned to Florida, having been appointed clerk of the Jefferson County court, a position he held until 1881. In 1883, Lamar, a Democrat, was appointed judge of the Jefferson County court, serving until 1886, when he was elected to the Florida House of Representatives, representing Jefferson County. Lamar served as a representative until 1889, when he was appointed the 16th Florida Attorney General by newly elected Governor Francis P. Fleming.

During his long 14-year tenure as Attorney General, Lamar oversaw the industrialization and modernization of the formerly agrarian Florida economy. However, Lamar ensured that Florida would remain segregated, as he turned a blind eye while his subordinates instituted laws banning blacks from entire towns.

=== U.S. Congress and later career ===
As a result of the 1900 U.S. Census, Florida was apportioned a third U.S. House seat for the 1902 election. Lamar received the Democratic nomination in 1902, and ran unopposed in the general election. He was reelected in 1904 after defeating Republican L. M. Ware. In 1906 he faced only token opposition from Socialist T. B. Meeker.

On December 23, 1907, one of Florida's U.S. Senators, Stephen Mallory, II, died in office. The Florida Legislature appointed Duval County solicitor William James Bryan to finish Mallory's term in the U.S. Senate, but Bryan died not long after, on March 22, 1908. The Legislature then appointed the former mayor of Marianna, Florida, William Hall Milton, to the Senate seat, which was up for election later that year.

Lamar did not run for reelection for his house seat, opting instead to run for the senate seat. However, Lamar did not receive the Democratic nomination, losing to the former mayor of Jacksonville Duncan U. Fletcher. Fletcher went on to win the seat, running unopposed in the general election.

After his loss in the Senate race, Lamar retired politically, returning to a private law practice. In 1915, he was appointed national commissioner to the Panama-Pacific International Exposition in San Francisco, California.

== Death and burial ==
Lamar died on September 26, 1928, at his winter home in Thomasville, Georgia. He is buried in Athens' Oconee Hill Cemetery.

Lamar married Ethel Healey on June 8, 1904, though they did not have children.

Legal offices
Preceded by Charles Merian Cooper	Florida Attorney General; 1889 – 1903	Succeeded by James B. Whitfield
U.S. House of Representatives
Preceded by New district	Member of the U.S. House of Representatives from Florida's 3rd congressional district March 4, 1903 – March 3, 1909	Succeeded by Dannite H. Mays
