= 1872 United States House of Representatives election in Florida =

- November 5, 1872

Both of Florida's seats to the United States House of Representatives
	Majority party	Minority party
Party	Republican	Democratic
Last election	1	0
Seats won	2	0
Seat change	▲1	Steady
Popular vote	35,040	31,692
Percentage	52.5%	47.5%
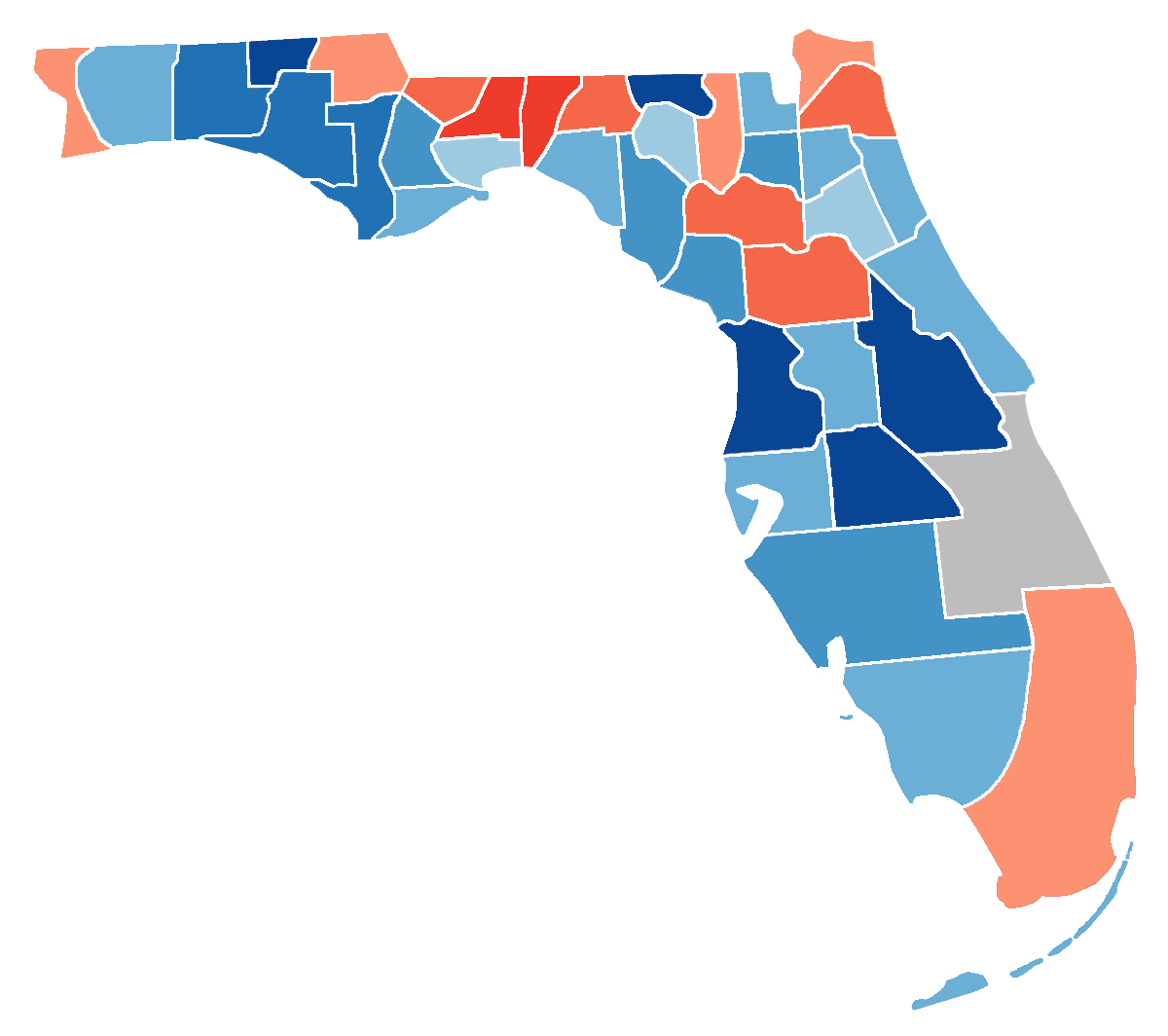
County Results
Republicans
50–59%
60–69%
70–79%
Democratic
50–59%
60–69%
70–79%
80–89%
90–100%
No Votes
No Votes

The election to the United States House of Representatives in Florida was held November 5, 1872, for two seats elected at large. This election was held at the same time as the 1872 Presidential election and the gubernatorial election.

== Background ==
From Florida's admission to the Union in 1845, it had been represented by a single Representative. In reapportionment following the 1870 census, Florida gained a second Representative. Districting was delayed, however, and so the at-large district was used for the 1872 election as well, with two seats instead of one. This would be the last time that Florida's representation would be at-large (there was an at-large seat for several later Congresses, but those were in addition to districts).

== Election results ==
1872 United States House election results
Republican			Democratic		
William J. Purman	17,537	26.3%	Silas L. Niblack	15,881	23.8%
Josiah T. Walls (I)	17,503	26.2%	Charles W. Jones	15,811	23.7%

=== Results ===
County	William J. Purman Republican		Josiah T. Walls Republican		Charles W. Jones Democratic		Silas L. Niblack Democratic		Total votes
County	#	%	#	%	#	%	#	%	Total votes
Alachua	1,501	33.09%	1,523	33.58%	765	16.87%	747	16.47%	4,536
Baker	87	18.71%	87	18.71%	146	31.40%	145	31.18%	465
Bradford	192	14.63%	190	14.48%	465	35.44%	465	35.44%	1,312
Brevard	0	0%	0	0%	0	0%	0	0%	0
Calhoun	33	8.66%	37	9.71%	156	40.94%	155	40.68%	381
Clay	106	15.59%	109	16.03%	233	34.26%	232	34.12%	680
Columbia	642	25.56%	642	25.56%	613	24.40%	615	24.48%	2,512
Dade	14	25.93%	14	25.93%	13	24.07%	13	24.07%	54
Duval	1,585	31.47%	1,598	31.73%	926	18.39%	927	18.41%	5,036
Escambia	795	26.37%	795	26.37%	714	23.68%	711	23.58%	3,015
Franklin	90	18.91%	92	19.33%	148	31.09%	146	30.67%	476
Gadsden	1,193	30.76%	1,192	30.73%	747	19.26%	747	19.26%	3,879
Hamilton	16	1.68%	14	1.47%	462	48.38%	463	48.48%	955
Hernando	5	1.35%	5	1.35%	180	48.52%	181	48.79%	371
Hillsborough	150	15.61%	147	15.30%	331	34.44%	333	34.65%	961
Holmes	1	0.23%	1	0.23%	221	49.77%	221	49.77%	444
Jackson	1,105	27.01%	1,108	27.08%	939	22.95%	939	22.95%	4,091
Jefferson	2,234	39.10%	2,234	39.10%	623	10.90%	623	10.90%	5,714
Lafayette	56	13.30%	38	9.03%	161	38.24%	166	39.43%	421
Leon	2,339	38.36%	2,345	38.46%	679	11.13%	735	12.05%	6,098
Levy	121	12.75%	125	13.17%	348	36.67%	355	37.41%	949
Liberty	46	13.94%	46	13.94%	119	36.06%	119	36.06%	330
Madison	1,292	32.37%	1,295	32.45%	701	17.56%	703	17.61%	3,991
Manatee	78	14.34%	60	11.03%	203	37.32%	203	37.32%	544
Marion	1,058	30.41%	1,061	30.50%	676	19.43%	684	19.66%	3,479
Monroe	278	15.33%	277	15.27%	628	34.62%	631	34.79%	1,814
Nassau	574	27.50%	574	27.50%	476	22.81%	463	22.18%	2,087
Orange	32	4.64%	10	1.45%	314	45.57%	333	48.33%	689
Polk	0	0%	0	0%	357	49.93%	358	50.07%	715
Putnam	388	24.05%	389	24.12%	418	25.91%	418	25.91%	1,613
Santa Rosa	352	18.99%	350	18.88%	579	31.23%	573	30.91%	1,854
St. Johns	180	15.93%	182	16.11%	384	33.98%	384	33.98%	1,130
Sumter	136	15.61%	131	15.04%	301	34.56%	303	34.79%	871
Suwannee	357	20.79%	359	20.91%	500	29.12%	501	29.18%	1,717
Taylor	93	19.18%	80	16.49%	156	32.16%	156	32.16%	485
Volusia	105	17.30%	104	17.13%	198	32.62%	200	32.95%	607
Wakulla	179	20.46%	179	20.46%	258	29.49%	259	29.60%	875
Walton	70	7.95%	57	6.47%	377	42.79%	377	42.79%	881
Washington	54	7.71%	53	7.57%	296	42.29%	297	42.43%	700
Totals	17,537	26.28%	17,503	26.23%	15,811	23.69%	15,881	23.80%	66,732

== See also ==
- 1872 United States presidential election in Florida
- 1872 and 1873 United States House of Representatives elections
- 1872 Florida gubernatorial election
