= 1870 United States House of Representatives election in Florida =

United States House of Representatives election in Florida, 1870
- November 8, 1870

Florida's single seat to the United States House of Representatives
	Majority party	Minority party
Party	Republican	Democratic
Last election	1	0
Seats won	1	0
Seat change	Steady	Steady
Popular vote	12,439	11,812
Percentage	51.29%	48.71%
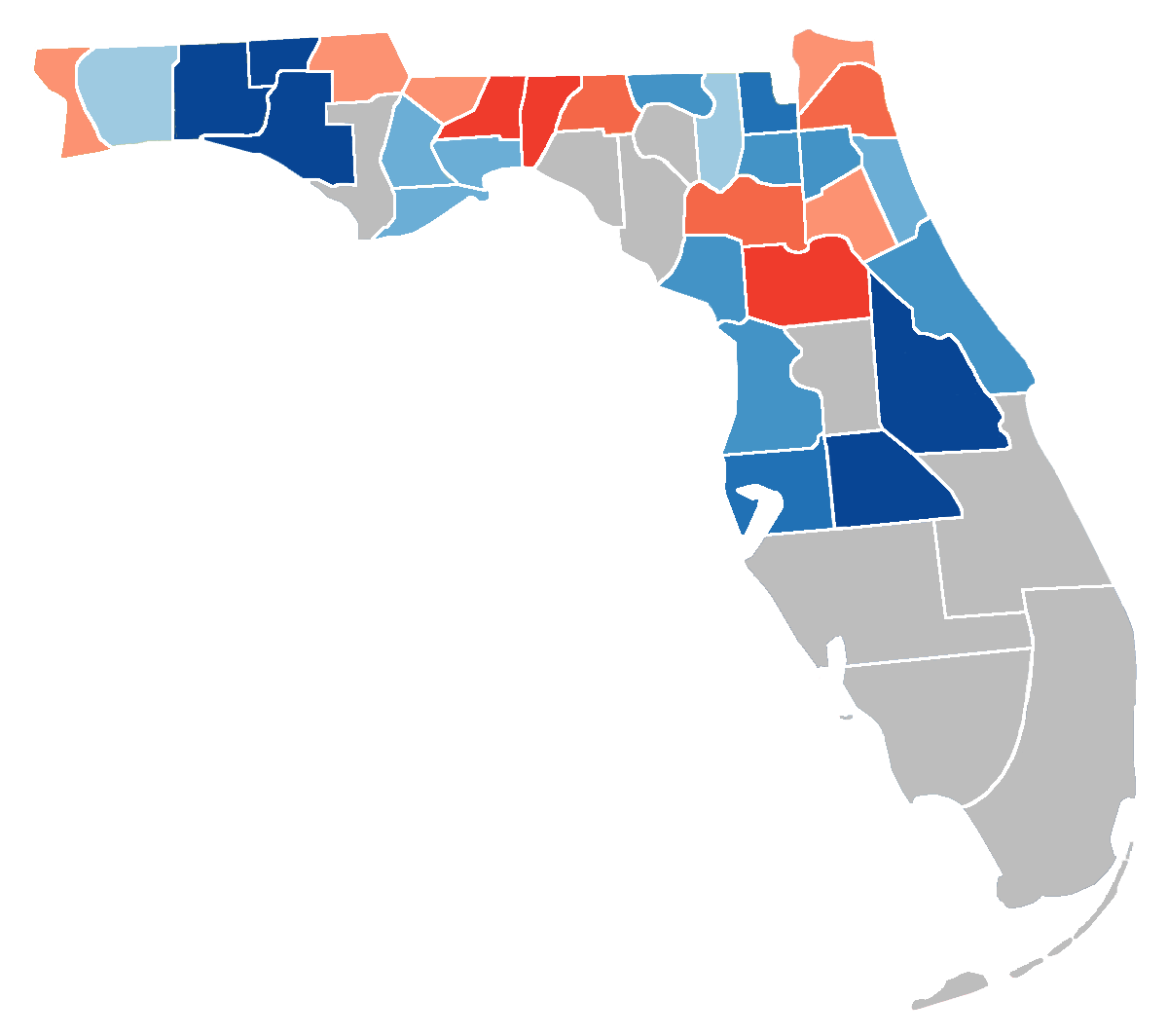
County Results
Walls
50–59%
60–69%
70–79%
Niblack
50–59%
60–69%
70–79%
80–89%
90–100%
No Votes
No Votes

United States House of Representatives election in Florida, 1870 recount
- January 21, 1873

Florida's single seat to the United States House of Representatives
	Majority party	Minority party
Party	Republican	Democratic
Last election	1	0
Seats won	0	1
Seat change	▼1	▲1
Popular vote	13,260	13,397
Percentage	49.74%	50.26%
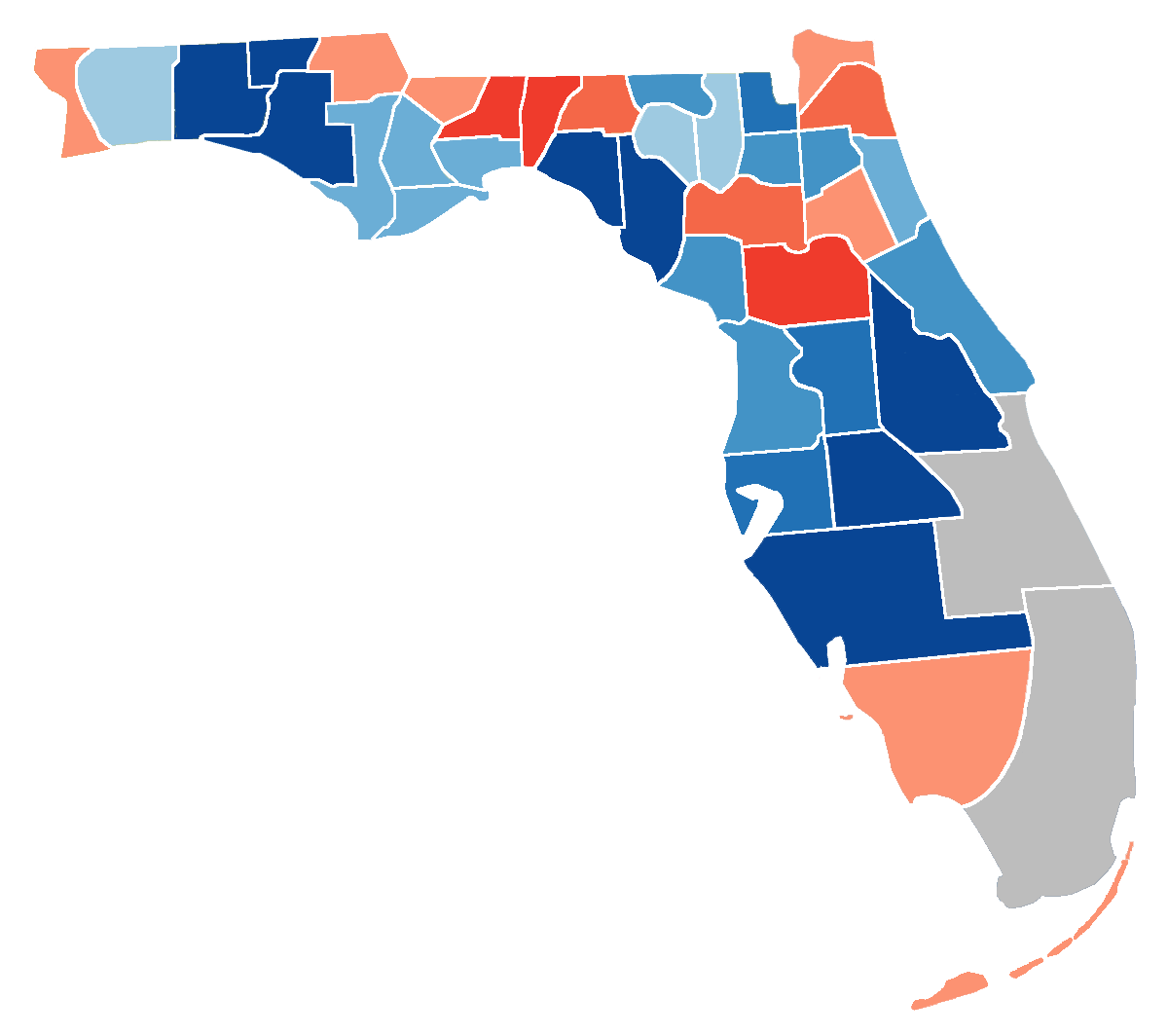
County Results
Walls
50–59%
60–69%
70–79%
Niblack
50–59%
60–69%
70–79%
80–89%
90–100%
No Votes
No Votes

The election to the United States House of Representatives in Florida was held on November 8, 1870 for the 42nd Congress, the last election in which Florida had a single Representative.

== Background ==
Florida had been readmitted to the Union following Reconstruction in 1868, with representation starting July 1, 1868

== Initial election results ==
1870 United States House election results
Republican			Democratic		
Josiah T. Walls	12,439	51.3%	Silas L. Niblack	11,812	48.7%

=== Results ===
County	Josiah T. Walls Republican		Silas L. Niblack Democratic		Total votes
County	#	%	#	%	Total votes
Alachua	1,281	64.86%	694	35.14%	1,975
Baker	36	16.98%	176	83.02%	212
Bradford	143	23.79%	458	76.21%	601
Brevard*	0	0%	0	0%	0
Calhoun*	0	0%	0	0%	0
Clay	47	20.09%	187	79.91%	234
Columbia	487	41.24%	694	58.76%	1,181
Dade*	0	0%	0	0%	0
Duval	898	65.60%	471	34.40%	1,369
Escambia	569	56.39%	440	43.61%	1,009
Franklin	81	37.67%	134	62.33%	215
Gadsden	846	50.27%	837	49.73%	1,683
Hamilton	130	23.21%	430	76.79%	560
Hernando	132	29.33%	318	70.67%	450
Hillsborough	87	18.91%	373	81.09%	460
Holmes	6	3.02%	193	96.98%	199
Jackson	878	50.11%	874	49.89%	1,752
Jefferson	1,374	71.56%	546	28.44%	1,920
Lafayette*	0	0%	0	0%	0
Leon	1,543	73.30%	562	26.70%	2,105
Levy	86	21.45%	315	78.55%	401
Liberty	66	33.0%	134	67.0%	200
Madison	1,239	66.47%	625	33.53%	1,864
Manatee*	0	0%	0	0%	0
Marion	1,058	73.73%	377	26.27%	1,864
Monroe*	0	0%	0	0%	0
Nassau	510	58.02%	369	41.98%	879
Orange	17	4.96%	326	95.04%	343
Polk	0	0%	284	100%	284
Putnam	229	54.27%	193	45.73%	422
Santa Rosa	246	43.93%	314	56.07%	560
St. Johns	183	35.06%	339	64.94%	522
Sumter*	0	0%	0	0%	0
Suwannee*	0	0%	0	0%	0
Taylor*	0	0%	0	0%	0
Volusia	63	25.51%	184	74.49%	247
Wakulla	178	37.16%	301	62.84%	479
Walton	27	6.40%	395	93.60%	422
Washington	0	0%	270	100%	270
Actual Totals	12,440	51.29%	11,813	48.71%	24,253
Official Totals**	12,439	51.29%	11,812	48.71%	24,251
*Votes were rejected by State Board Canvass **Official results from the State of Florida is different from actual results

== Contested election ==
The election was contested, and on January 29, 1873, Niblack was declared the winner of the 1870 election and was seated in Congress.

1870 United States House election results recount
Republican			Democratic		
Josiah T. Walls	13,260	49.74%	Silas L. Niblack	13,397	50.26%

=== Results ===
County	Josiah T. Walls Republican		Silas L. Niblack Democratic		Total votes
County	#	%	#	%	Total votes
Alachua	1,281	64.86%	694	35.14%	1,975
Baker	36	16.98%	176	83.02%	212
Bradford	143	23.79%	458	76.21%	601
Brevard*	0	0%	0	0%	0
Calhoun	62	38.04%	101	61.96%	163
Clay	47	20.09%	187	79.91%	234
Columbia	487	41.24%	694	58.76%	1,181
Dade*	0	0%	0	0%	0
Duval	910	63.24%	529	36.76%	1,439
Escambia	569	56.39%	440	43.61%	1,009
Franklin	81	37.67%	134	62.33%	215
Gadsden	875	51.11%	837	48.89%	1,712
Hamilton	130	23.21%	430	76.79%	560
Hernando	132	29.33%	318	70.67%	450
Hillsborough	87	18.91%	373	81.09%	460
Holmes	6	3.02%	193	96.98%	199
Jackson	878	50.11%	874	49.89%	1,752
Jefferson	1,374	71.56%	546	28.44%	1,920
Lafayette	0	0%	68	100%	68
Leon	1,543	73.30%	562	26.70%	2,105
Levy	86	21.45%	315	78.55%	401
Liberty	66	33.0%	134	67.0%	200
Madison	1,239	66.47%	625	33.53%	1,864
Manatee	0	0%	192	100%	192
Marion	1,058	73.73%	377	26.27%	1,864
Monroe	428	54.38%	359	45.62%	787
Nassau	510	58.02%	369	41.98%	879
Orange	17	4.96%	326	95.04%	343
Polk	0	0%	284	100%	284
Putnam	229	54.27%	193	45.73%	422
Santa Rosa	246	43.93%	314	56.07%	560
St. Johns	183	35.06%	339	64.94%	522
Sumter	60	35.06%	314	83.96%	374
Suwannee	230	41.97%	318	58.03%	548
Taylor	0	0%	177	100%	177
Volusia	63	25.51%	184	74.49%	247
Wakulla	178	37.16%	301	62.84%	479
Walton	27	6.40%	395	93.60%	422
Washington	0	0%	270	100%	270
Actual Totals	13,261	49.74%	13,400	50.26%	26,661
Official Totals**	13,260	51.29%	13,397	48.71%	26,657
*Votes was rejected by US House of Representatives **Official results from the US House of Representatives is different from actual results

== See also ==
- United States House of Representatives elections, 1870
