= William J. Purman =

American politician

William Purman
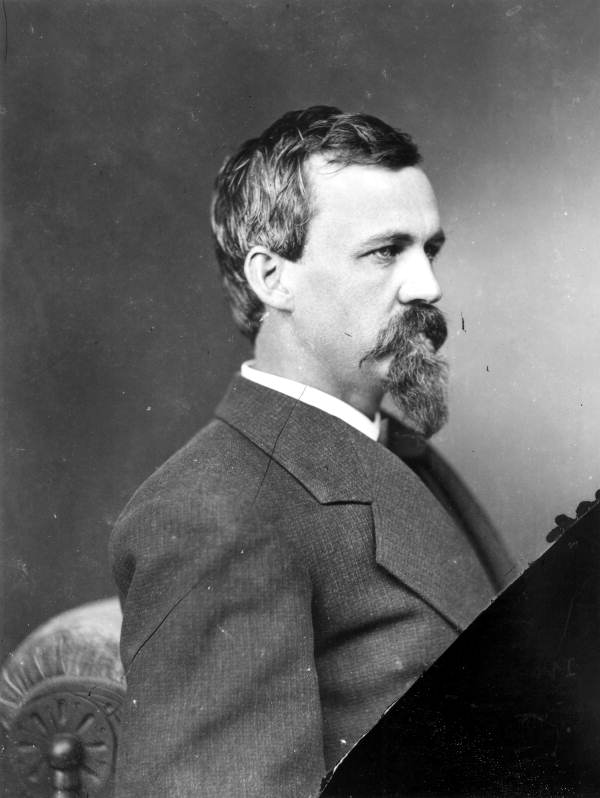
- Purman, c. 1873–1877

Member of the U.S. House of Representatives from Florida
- In office March 4, 1875 – March 3, 1877
- Preceded by: District established
- Succeeded by: Robert H. M. Davidson
- Constituency: 1st district
- In office March 4, 1873 – January 25, 1875
- Preceded by: Silas L. Niblack
- Succeeded by: District abolished
- Constituency: at-large district

Member of the Florida Senate
- In office 1869–1872

Personal details
- Born: William James Purman; April 11, 1840 Millheim, Pennsylvania, U.S.
- Died: August 14, 1928 (aged 88) Washington, D.C., U.S.
- Party: Republican

William James Purman (April 11, 1840 – August 14, 1928) was a U.S. representative from Florida. A Republican, he also served in the Florida Senate and in the Florida House of Representatives.

== Early life ==
Purman was born in Millheim, Centre County, Pennsylvania and attended the common schools before completing his studies at Aaronsburg Academy in Centre County, Pennsylvania.

== Early career ==
Purman taught school and studied law in Lock Haven, Pennsylvania. During the American Civil War, Purman joined the Union Army as a private and served on special duty at the War Department until he was transferred to Florida in 1865.

Purman was admitted to the bar in 1868 and commenced practice in Tallahassee, Florida. He was also a member of the State constitutional convention in 1868.

== Political career ==
Purman served in the Florida State Senate from 1869-1872. He was appointed by the Governor and confirmed by the State senate as secretary of state in 1869 but declined the position. He was chairman of the Florida Commission in 1869 for entering into negotiations for transfer of West Florida to the State of Alabama, a transfer that was not ratified by Alabama.

Purman narrowly escaped an assassin's bullet in 1868 which left his brother-in-law—who was a former surgeon in the Confederate Army—dead. The two had many differences including the many African Americans he appointed to federal jobs. Purman testified before the U.S. Congress during KKK hearings that not one person had ever been arrested for the group's crimes in Florida.

Purman was assessor of United States internal revenue for the district of Florida 1870–1872, and served as chairman of the Republican State committee 1870–1872. He was member of the Republican National Committee 1876–1880, and elected as a Republican to the Forty-third United States Congress where he served from March 4, 1873, until his resignation on January 25, 1875.

Purman was a member of the Florida House of Representatives for one session and resigned when elected to the Forty-fourth United States Congress (March 4, 1875 – March 3, 1877). He was an unsuccessful candidate for reelection in 1876 to the Forty-fifth United States Congress and in 1878 he returned to Millheim, Pennsylvania where he engaged in agricultural pursuits.

A July 28, 1876, report to Congress from the Committee on Reform in the Civil Service recommended Purman be investigated for his appointment of timber agents in Florida, and

that those agents never performed any service under their appointments, except to draw their pay; that in some instances Mr. Purman notified them beforehand that they would have nothing to do...that they, nor any of them, so far as the evidence shows, ever visited said reservations, nor even knew the location thereof; that the offices are mere sinecures; and that the appointments were made for political effect and purposes only.

In 1883, Purman moved to Boston, Massachusetts, then to Washington, D.C., where he lived in retirement until his death. His remains were cremated and the ashes deposited in a vault at Glenwood Cemetery.

U.S. House of Representatives
Preceded by Silas L. Niblack	Member of the U.S. House of Representatives from Florida's at-large congressional district March 4, 1873 – January 25, 1875	Succeeded by Seat eliminated
Preceded by New seat	Member of the U.S. House of Representatives from Florida's 1st congressional district March 4, 1875 – March 3, 1877	Succeeded by Robert H. M. Davidson
