= List of elections in 1845 =

The following elections occurred in the year 1845.

== Europe ==
- 1845 Belgian general election
- 1845 Luxembourg general election
- 1845 Portuguese legislative election

== North America ==
=== United States ===
- 1845 New York state election

==== United States Senate ====
- 1844 and 1845 United States Senate elections
- 1845 United States Senate elections in New York
- 1845 United States Senate election in Pennsylvania
- 1845 United States Senate special election in Pennsylvania

==== United States House of Representatives ====
- 1844 and 1845 United States House of Representatives elections
- 1845 Florida's at-large congressional district special election
- 1845 United States House of Representatives election in Florida

==== United States lieutenant gubernatorial ====
- 1845 Connecticut lieutenant gubernatorial election
- 1845 Texas lieutenant gubernatorial election

==== United States gubernatorial ====
- 1845 Alabama gubernatorial election
- 1845 Connecticut gubernatorial election
- 1845 Florida gubernatorial election
- 1845 Georgia gubernatorial election
- 1845 Maine gubernatorial election
- 1845–46 Massachusetts gubernatorial election
- 1845 Michigan gubernatorial election
- 1845 Mississippi gubernatorial election
- 1845 New Hampshire gubernatorial election
- 1845 Rhode Island gubernatorial election
- 1845 Tennessee gubernatorial election
- 1845 Texas gubernatorial election
- 1845 Vermont gubernatorial election
- 1845 Virginia gubernatorial election

==== United States mayoral elections ====
- 1844–45 Boston mayoral election
- December 1845 Boston mayoral election
- 1845 Chicago mayoral election
- 1845 Philadelphia mayoral election

== See also ==
- Category:1845 elections
