= 1848 United States House of Representatives election in Florida =

- October 2, 1848
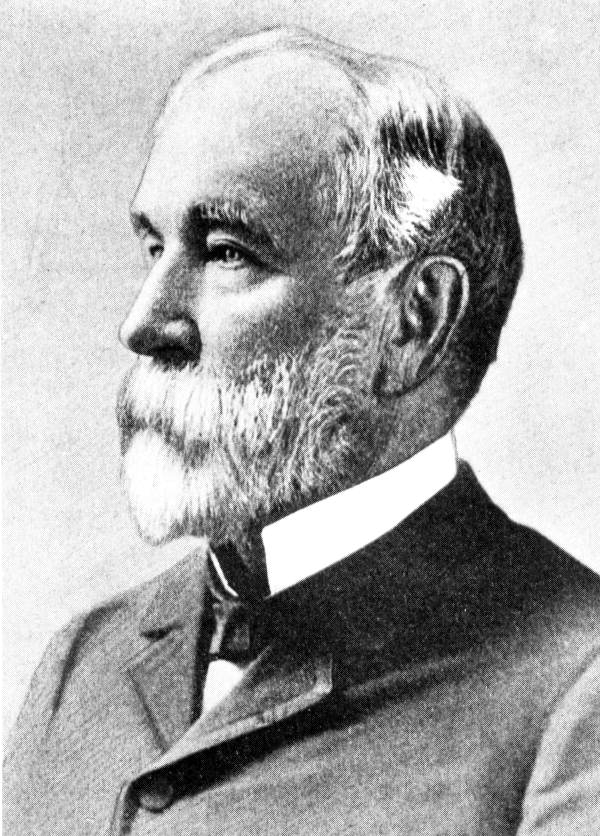

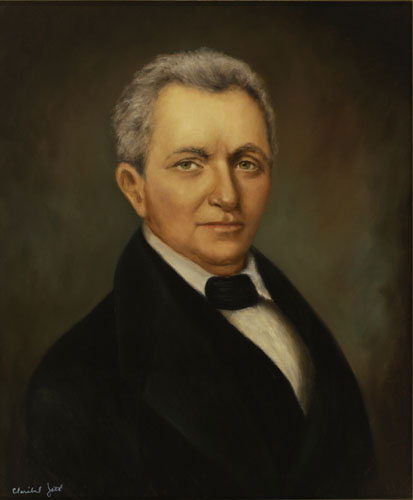
Nominee	Edward Carrington Cabell	William Pope Duval
Party	Whig	Democratic
Popular vote	4,382	3,805
Percentage	53.52%	46.48%
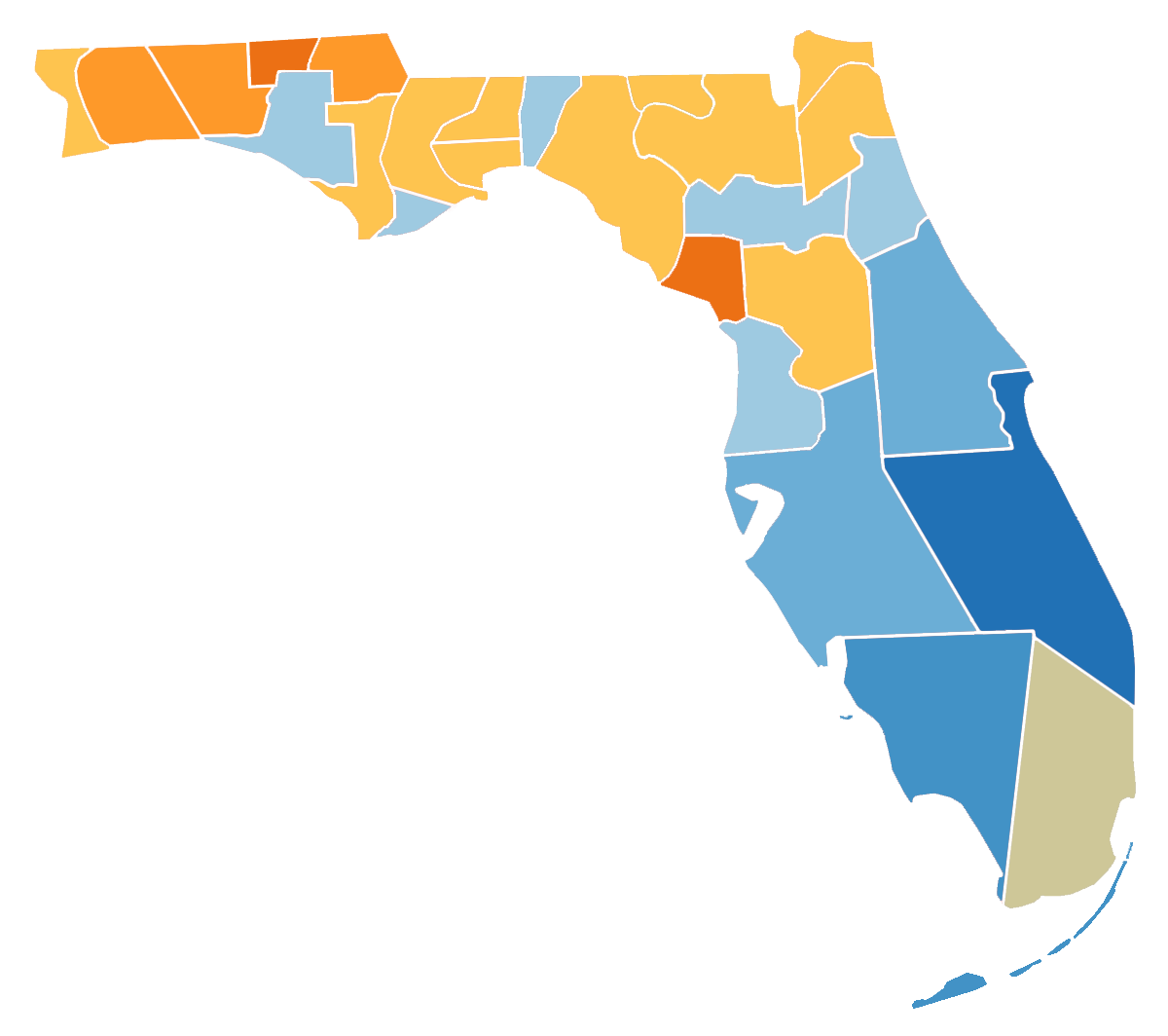
- County results Cabell: 50–59% 60–69% 70–79% Duval: 50–59% 60–69% 70–79% 80–89% Tie
Representative before election
Edward Carrington Cabell
Whig
Elected Representative
Edward Carrington Cabell
Whig

The 1848 United States House of Representatives election in Florida was held on Monday, October 2, 1848, to elect the single United States Representative from the state of Florida, one from the state's single at-large congressional district, to represent Florida in the 31st Congress. The election coincided with the elections of other offices, including the presidential election, the senatorial election, the gubernatorial election, and various state and local elections.

The winning candidate would serve a two-year term in the United States House of Representatives from March 4, 1849, to March 4, 1851.

== Candidates ==
=== Whig ===
==== Nominee ====
- Edward Carrington Cabell, incumbent U.S. representative

=== Democratic ===
==== Nominee ====
- William Pope Duval, former territorial governor of Florida

== Campaign ==
Cabell, despite being a Whig in the deeply Democratic supporting South, and despite running against a popular former governor in Duval, had the blessing of running alongside two other popular Whigs in the state of Florida: Zachary Taylor for president and Thomas Brown for governor, both of whom served as generals during the Second Seminole War and were seen as war heroes in the state. Despite winning by an extremely small margin in 1846, the coattail effect expanded Cabell's margin in this election.

== General election ==
=== Results ===
Florida's at-large congressional district election, 1848
Party	Candidate	Votes	%	±%
Whig	Edward Carrington Cabell (inc.)	4,382	53.52%	+2.64%
Democratic	William Pope Duval	3,805	46.48%	−2.64%
Majority		577	7.05%	+5.30%
Turnout		8,187	100.00%	
Whig hold				

=== Results by County ===
County	Edward Carrington Cabell Whig		William Pope Duval Democratic		Total votes
County	%	#	%	#	Total votes
Alachua	47.0%	149	53.0%	168	317
Benton	43.44%	53	56.56%	69	122
Calhoun	51.64%	63	48.36%	59	122
Columbia	50.43%	295	49.57%	290	585
Dade	50.0%	3	50.0%	3	6
Duval	54.28%	279	45.72%	235	514
Escambia	56.55%	203	43.45%	156	359
Franklin	42.02%	100	57.98%	138	238
Gadsden	57.16%	435	42.84%	326	761
Hamilton	51.04%	147	48.96%	141	288
Hillsborough	33.62%	77	66.38%	152	229
Holmes	77.71%	129	22.29%	37	166
Jackson	68.07%	405	31.93%	190	595
Jefferson	48.13%	219	51.87%	236	455
Leon	56.13%	394	43.87%	308	702
Levy	70.37%	38	29.63%	16	54
Madison	57.06%	299	42.94%	225	524
Marion	50.71%	215	49.29%	209	424
Monroe	29.79%	56	70.21%	132	188
Nassau	53.61%	89	46.39%	77	166
Orange	32.76%	19	67.24%	39	58
Santa Rosa	67.97%	174	32.03%	82	256
St. Johns	43.0%	129	57.0%	171	300
St. Lucie	15.0%	3	85.0%	17	20
Wakulla	57.21%	127	42.79%	95	222
Walton	64.08%	127	35.92%	102	284
Washington	43.10%	100	56.90%	132	232
Totals	53.52%	4,382	46.48%	3,805	8,187

== See also ==
- 1848 United States presidential election in Florida
- 1848 United States House of Representatives elections
- 1848 Florida gubernatorial election
