= 1846 United States House of Representatives election in Florida =

- October 5, 1846
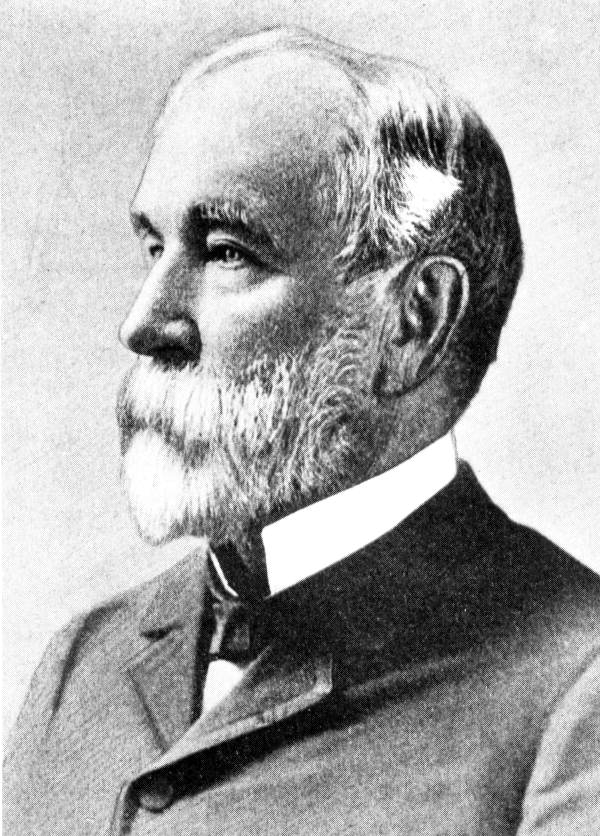

Nominee	Edward Carrington Cabell	William A. Kain
Party	Whig	Democratic
Popular vote	2,990	2,887
Percentage	50.88%	49.12%
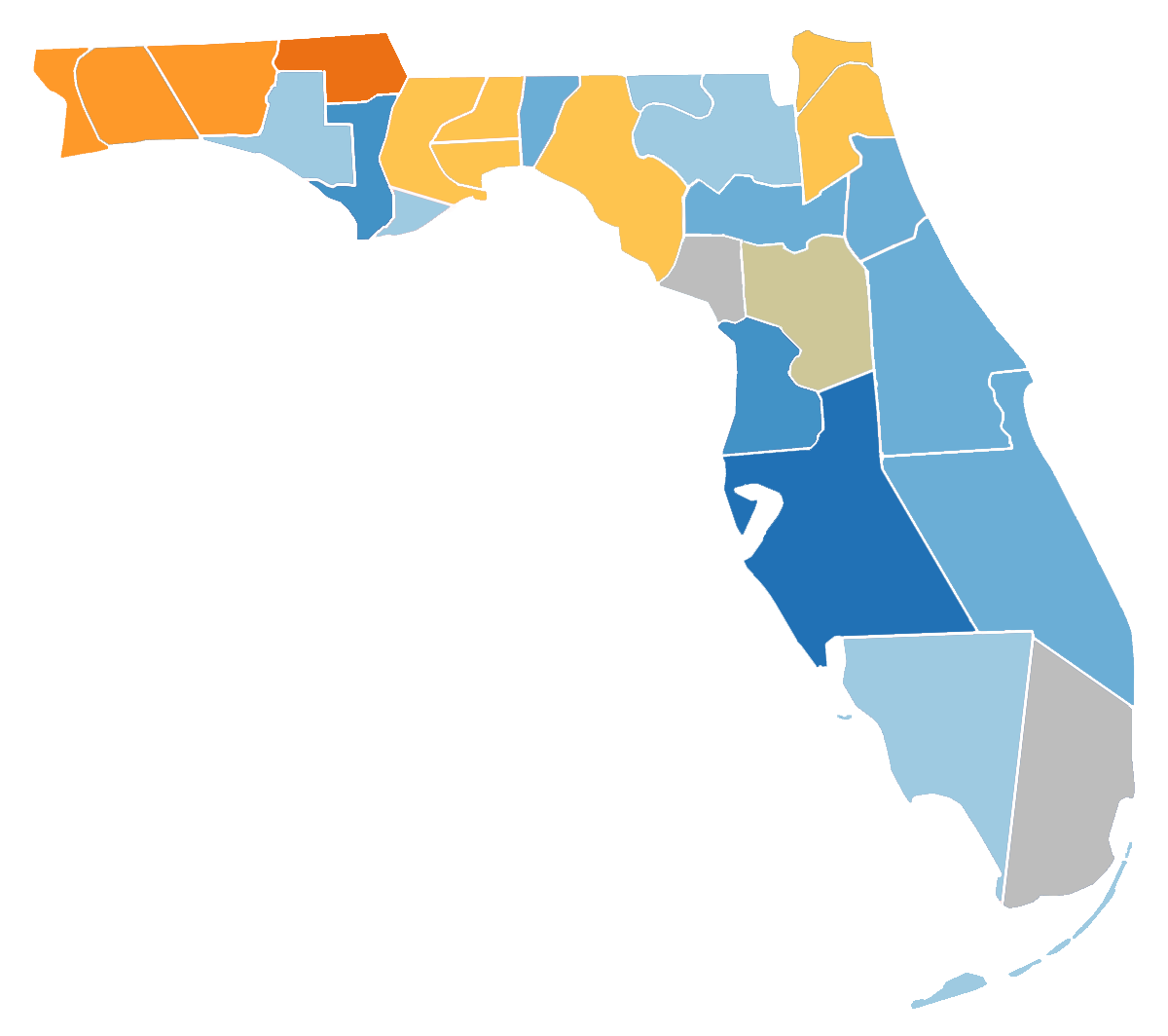
- County results Cabell: 50–59% 60–69% 70–79% Kain: 50–59% 60–69% 70–79% 80–89% Tie; No Votes
Representative before election
William Henry Brockenbrough
Democratic
Elected Representative
Edward Carrington Cabell
Whig

The 1846 United States House of Representatives election in Florida was held on Monday, October 5, 1846, to elect the single United States Representative from the state of Florida, one from the state's single at-large congressional district, to represent Florida in the 30th Congress. The election coincided with the elections of other offices, including various state and local elections. The party primaries were held on June 20, 1846.

The winning candidate would serve a two-year term in the United States House of Representatives from March 4, 1847, to March 4, 1849.

== Background ==
In the 1845 congressional election, David Levy Yulee, a Democrat, was elected to the United States House of Representatives. However, Yulee was jointly elected by the Florida Legislature to the United States Senate, and so resigned from the House of Representatives before taking his seat in order to take his seat in the Senate.

A special election was held later in 1845, which saw the election of Edward Carrington Cabell, a Whig. However, his opponent, William Henry Brockenbrough, a Democrat, successfully challenged the results of the election and was seated in the House on January 24, 1846.

== Candidates ==
=== Democratic ===
==== Nominee ====
- William A. Kain, state senator

==== Eliminated at party convention ====
- William Henry Brockenbrough, incumbent U.S. representative
- Isaac H. Bronson, former U.S. representative for New York's 18th congressional district
- Chandler C. Younge, lawyer

=== Whig ===
==== Nominee ====
- Edward Carrington Cabell, former U.S. representative for Florida's at-large congressional district

== General election ==
=== Results ===
Florida's at-large congressional district election, 1846
Party	Candidate	Votes	%	±%
Whig	Edward Carrington Cabell	2,990	50.88%	+1.23%
Democratic	William A. Kain	2,887	49.12%	−1.23%
Majority		103	1.75%	+1.05%
Turnout		5,877	100.00%	
Whig gain from Democratic				

=== Results by County ===
County	Edward C. Cabell Whig		William A. Kain Democratic		Total votes
County	%	#	%	#	Total votes
Alachua	38.78%	95	61.22%	150	245
Benton	28.16%	29	71.84%	74	103
Calhoun	26.90%	39	73.10%	106	145
Columbia	45.69%	212	54.31%	252	464
Dade*	0%	0	0%	0	0
Duval	52.26%	220	47.74%	201	421
Escambia	66.67%	134	33.33%	67	201
Franklin	49.43%	86	50.57%	88	174
Gadsden	56.71%	279	43.29%	213	492
Hamilton	46.40%	103	53.60%	119	222
Hillsborough	11.11%	11	88.89%	88	99
Jackson	76.44%	318	23.56%	98	416
Jefferson	36.69%	124	63.31%	214	338
Leon	56.86%	340	43.14%	258	598
Levy*	0%	0	0%	0	0
Madison	54.13%	177	45.87%	150	327
Marion	50.0%	110	50.0%	110	220
Monroe	40.22%	74	59.78%	110	184
Nassau	52.21%	71	47.79%	65	136
Orange	34.15%	14	65.85%	27	41
Santa Rosa	60.59%	103	39.41%	67	170
St. Johns	30.96%	74	69.23%	165	239
St. Lucie	30.77%	4	69.23%	9	13
Wakulla	56.77%	88	43.23%	67	155
Walton	69.72%	221	30.28%	96	317
Washington	40.76%	64	59.24%	93	157
Totals	50.88%	2,990	49.12%	2,887	5,877
*Levy and Dade County had no returns.

== See also ==
- United States House of Representatives elections, 1846
