= Joseph Branch =

Joseph Branch may refer to:

- Joseph Branch (judge) (1915–1991), American jurist and North Carolina politician
- Joseph Branch (Florida politician) (1817–1867), American lawyer and politician

== See also ==
- Joe Branch, a stream in Hickman County, Tennessee, United States
