= 1848 Florida gubernatorial election =

- October 2, 1848
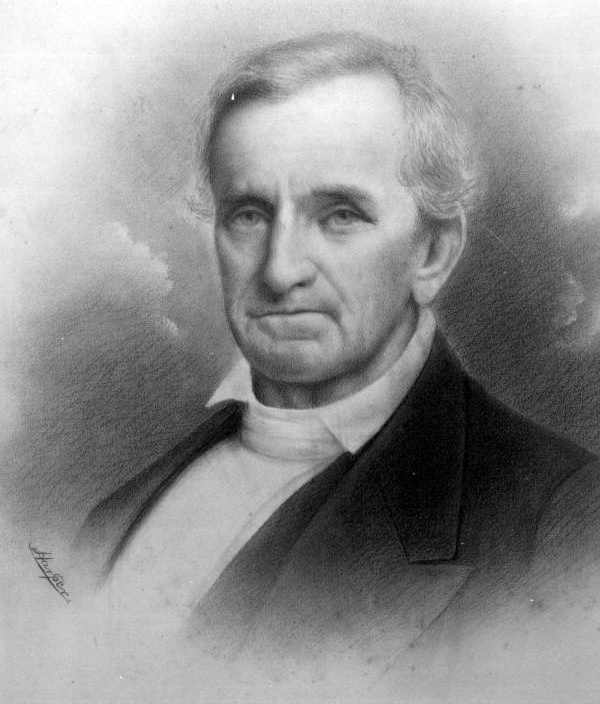

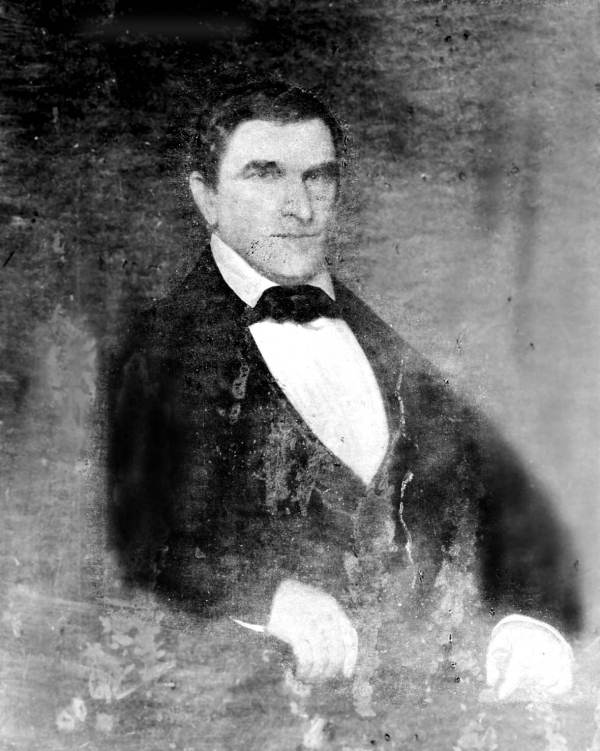
Nominee	Thomas Brown	William Bailey
Party	Whig	Democratic
Popular vote	4,145	3,746
Percentage	52.53%	47.47%
County results
Brown:
50–60%
60–70%
Bailey:
50–60%
60–70%
70–80%
80–90%
>90%
No Votes:
No Votes
Governor before election
William Dunn Moseley
Democratic
Elected Governor
Thomas Brown
Whig

The 1848 Florida gubernatorial election was held on October 2, 1848. Whig nominee Thomas Brown defeated the Democratic nominee William Bailey.

== General election ==
=== Candidates ===
==== Whig ====
- Thomas Brown

==== Democratic ====
- William Bailey

=== Results ===
1848 Florida gubernatorial election
Party	Candidate	Votes	%	±%
Whig	Thomas Brown	4,145	52.53%	+12.85%
Democratic	William Bailey	3,746	47.47%	−12.85%
Total votes		7,891	100%	
Whig gain from Democratic				

==== Results by County ====
County	William Bailey Democratic		Thomas Brown Whig		Total votes
County	#	%	#	%	Total votes
Alachua	163	53.97%	139	46.03%	302
Benton	69	59.48%	47	40.52%	116
Calhoun	56	45.16%	68	54.84%	124
Columbia	293	51.86%	272	48.14%	565
Dade	5	100.00%	0	0.00%	5
Duval	241	46.62%	276	53.38%	517
Escambia	153	42.74%	205	57.26%	358
Franklin	136	57.38%	101	42.62%	237
Gadsden	325	42.54%	439	57.46%	764
Hamilton	238	63.13%	139	36.87%	377
Hillsborough*	0	0	0	0.00%	0
Holmes	50	30.30%	115	69.70%	165
Jackson	184	31.40%	402	68.60%	586
Jefferson	280	63.64%	160	36.36%	440
Leon	277	41.10%	397	58.90%	674
Levy	16	30.19%	37	69.81%	53
Madison	200	41.32%	284	58.68%	484
Marion	198	48.18%	213	51.82%	411
Monroe	127	69.02%	57	30.98%	184
Nassau	93	52.54%	84	47.46%	177
Orange	42	70.00%	18	30.00%	60
Santa Rosa	85	32.44%	177	67.56%	262
St. Johns	164	55.97%	129	44.03%	293
St. Lucie	17	85.00%	3	15.00%	20
Wakulla	91	41.18%	130	58.82%	221
Walton	103	39.31%	159	60.69%	262
Washington	140	59.83%	94	40.17%	234
Totals	3,746	47.47%	4,145	52.53%	7,891
*Hillsborough County had no returns

== See also ==
- 1848 United States presidential election in Florida
- 1848 United States House of Representatives election in Florida
