= 1854 United States House of Representatives election in Florida =

- October 2, 1854
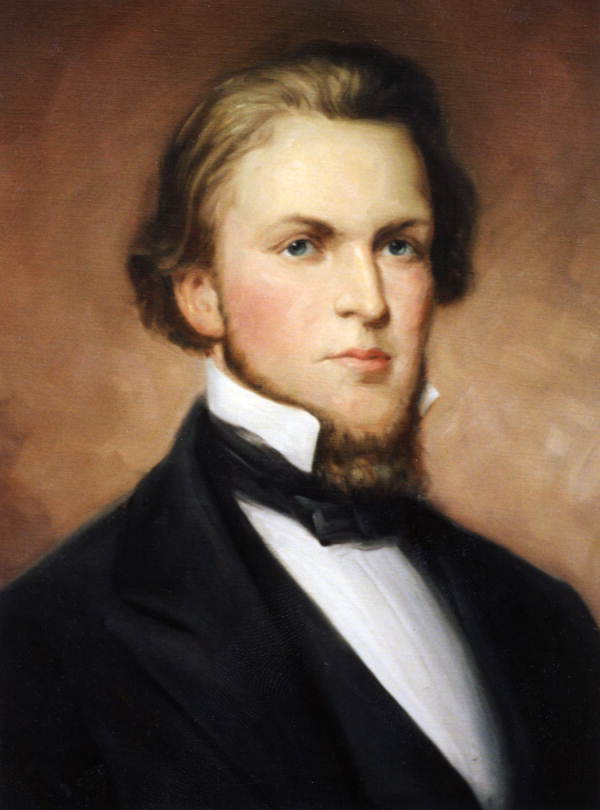

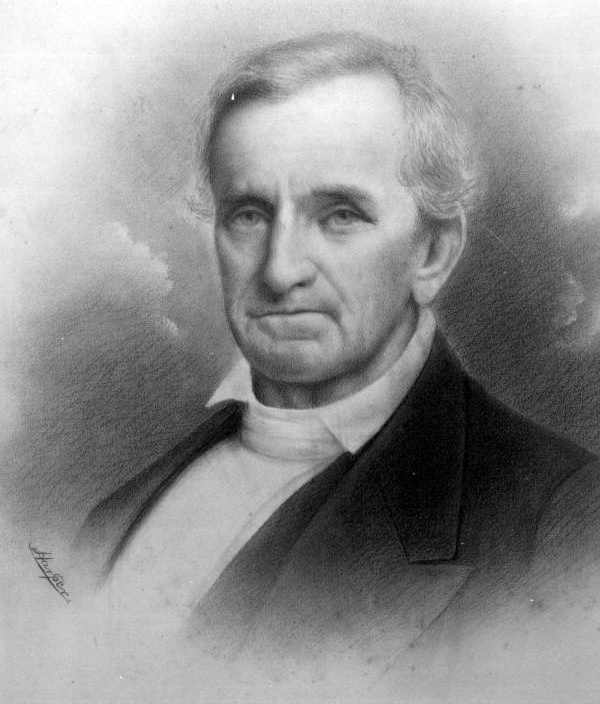
Nominee	Augustus Maxwell	Thomas Brown
Party	Democratic	Whig
Popular vote	5,638	4,564
Percentage	55.26%	44.74%
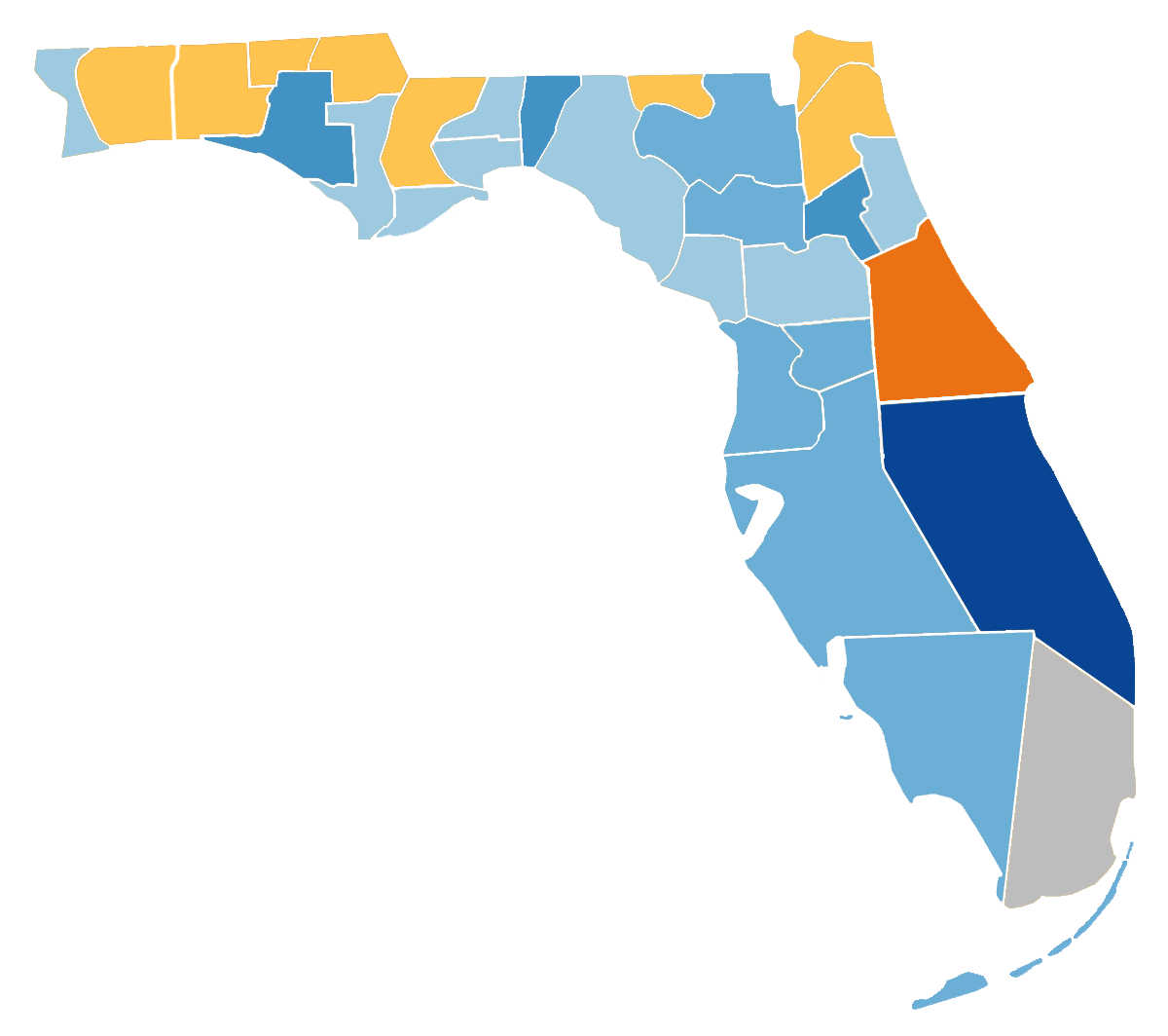
County results
Maxwell:
50–59%
60–69%
70–79%
80–89%
90–100%
Brown:
50–59%
60–69%
70–79%
No Votes:
No Votes
Representative before election
Augustus Maxwell
Democratic
Elected Representative
Augustus Maxwell
Democratic

The 1854 United States House of Representatives election in Florida was held on Monday, October 2, 1854, to elect the single United States Representative from the state of Florida, one from the state's single at-large congressional district, to represent Florida in the 34th Congress. The election coincided with the elections of other offices, including the senatorial election and various state and local elections.

The winning candidate would serve a two-year term in the United States House of Representatives from March 4, 1855, to March 4, 1857.

== Candidates ==
=== Democratic ===
==== Nominee ====
- Augustus Maxwell, incumbent U.S. representative

=== Whig ===
==== Nominee ====
- Thomas Brown, former governor of Florida

== Campaign ==
Despite Brown leaving office as a popular governor, the national Whig Party had all but collapsed by this election. Additionally, many Southerners who were formerly sympathetic to the Whigs now aligned fully with the Democratic Party, due to the perception that the Whigs were willing to compromise with abolitionist Northerners. To take advantage of this, Maxwell actively campaigned in Pensacola, a former Whig stronghold, as well as running up his margins in deeply conservative North Central Florida, particularly in Columbia and Jefferson counties, both of which had high enslaved populations.

== General election ==
=== Results ===
Florida's at-large congressional district election, 1854
Party	Candidate	Votes	%	±%
Democratic	Augustus Maxwell (inc.)	5,638	55.26%	+5.14%
Whig	Thomas Brown	4,564	44.74%	−3.64%
Majority		1,074	10.53%	−6.81%
Turnout		10,202	100.00%	
Democratic hold				

=== By County ===
County	Augustus Maxwell Democratic		Thomas Brown Whig		Total votes
County	#	%	#	%	Total votes
Alachua	262	61.79%	162	38.21%	424
Calhoun	87	50.88%	84	49.12%	171
Columbia	529	61.37%	333	38.63%	862
Duval	406	49.39%	416	50.61%	822
Escambia	179	50.28%	177	49.72%	356
Franklin	132	52.38%	120	47.62%	252
Gadsden	388	47.37%	431	52.63%	819
Hamilton	133	49.44%	136	50.56%	269
Hernando	124	63.92%	70	36.08%	194
Hillsborough	223	65.20%	119	34.80%	342
Holmes	66	46.15%	77	53.85%	143
Jackson	357	46.30%	414	53.70%	771
Jefferson	364	74.90%	122	25.10%	486
Leon	424	55.86%	335	44.14%	759
Levy	59	55.14%	48	44.86%	107
Madison	437	55.60%	349	44.40%	786
Marion	256	56.64%	196	43.36%	452
Monroe	151	66.81%	75	33.19%	226
Nassau	60	46.15%	70	53.85%	130
Orange	18	22.50%	62	77.50%	80
Putnam	123	70.29%	52	29.71%	175
Santa Rosa	188	47.84%	205	52.16%	393
St. Johns	137	57.08%	103	42.92%	240
St. Lucie	12	100%	0	0%	12
Sumter	78	61.90%	48	38.10%	126
Wakulla	169	55.78%	134	44.22%	303
Walton	132	43.56%	171	56.44%	303
Washington	144	72.36%	55	27.64%	199
Totals	5,638	55.26%	4,564	44.74%	10,202

== See also ==
- United States House of Representatives elections, 1854
