= 1892 United States House of Representatives elections in Florida =

United States House of Representatives elections in Florida, 1892
- November 8, 1892

Both of Florida's seats to the United States House of Representatives
	Majority party	Minority party
Party	Democratic	Populist
Last election	2	0
Seats won	2	0
Seat change	Steady	Steady
Popular vote	30,781	4,641
Percentage	86.6%	13.1%

The 1892 United States House of Representatives elections in Florida were held on November 8, 1892, for two seats in the 53rd Congress. These elections were held at the same time as the 1892 presidential election and election for governor.

== Background ==
Florida's congressional delegation had been dominated by Democrats since 1884, with the Republicans losing every Congressional election since then. In 1890, a new party, the People's Party, also known as the Populists, had been established, winning nine seats in the House.

== Election results ==
The Republicans did not run any candidates for Congress in 1892. The new People's Party made its first appearance in Florida's congressional elections this year. Democrat Robert Bullock of the 2nd district did not run for renomination.

1892 United States House election results
District	Democratic			Populist			Other		
1st	Stephen R. Mallory, Jr. (I)	16,113	99.2%				Scattering	134	0.8%
2nd	Charles Merian Cooper	14,668	76.0%	Austin S. Mann	4,641	24.0%			

== See also ==
- United States House of Representatives elections, 1892
