= Attorney General Raney =

Attorney General Raney may refer to:

- George P. Raney (1845–1911), Attorney General of Florida
- William Raney (1859–1933), Attorney General of Ontario
