= 1850 United States House of Representatives election in Florida =

- October 7, 1850
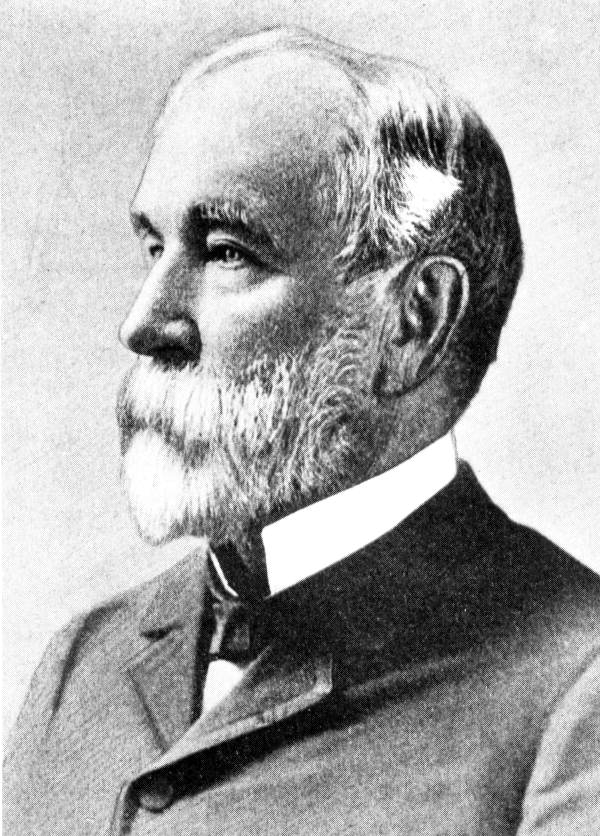

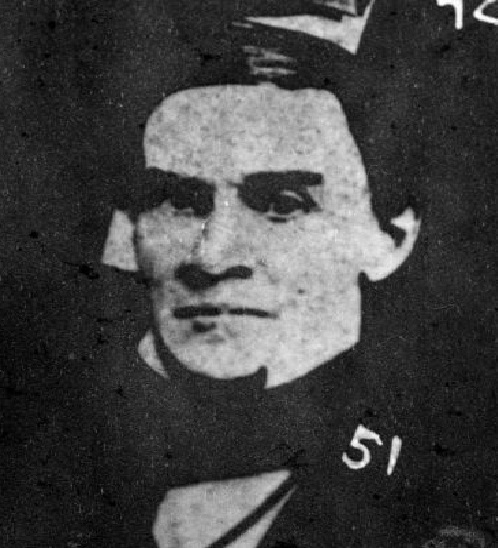
Nominee	Edward Carrington Cabell	John Beard
Party	Whig	Democratic
Popular vote	4,531	4,050
Percentage	52.80%	47.20%
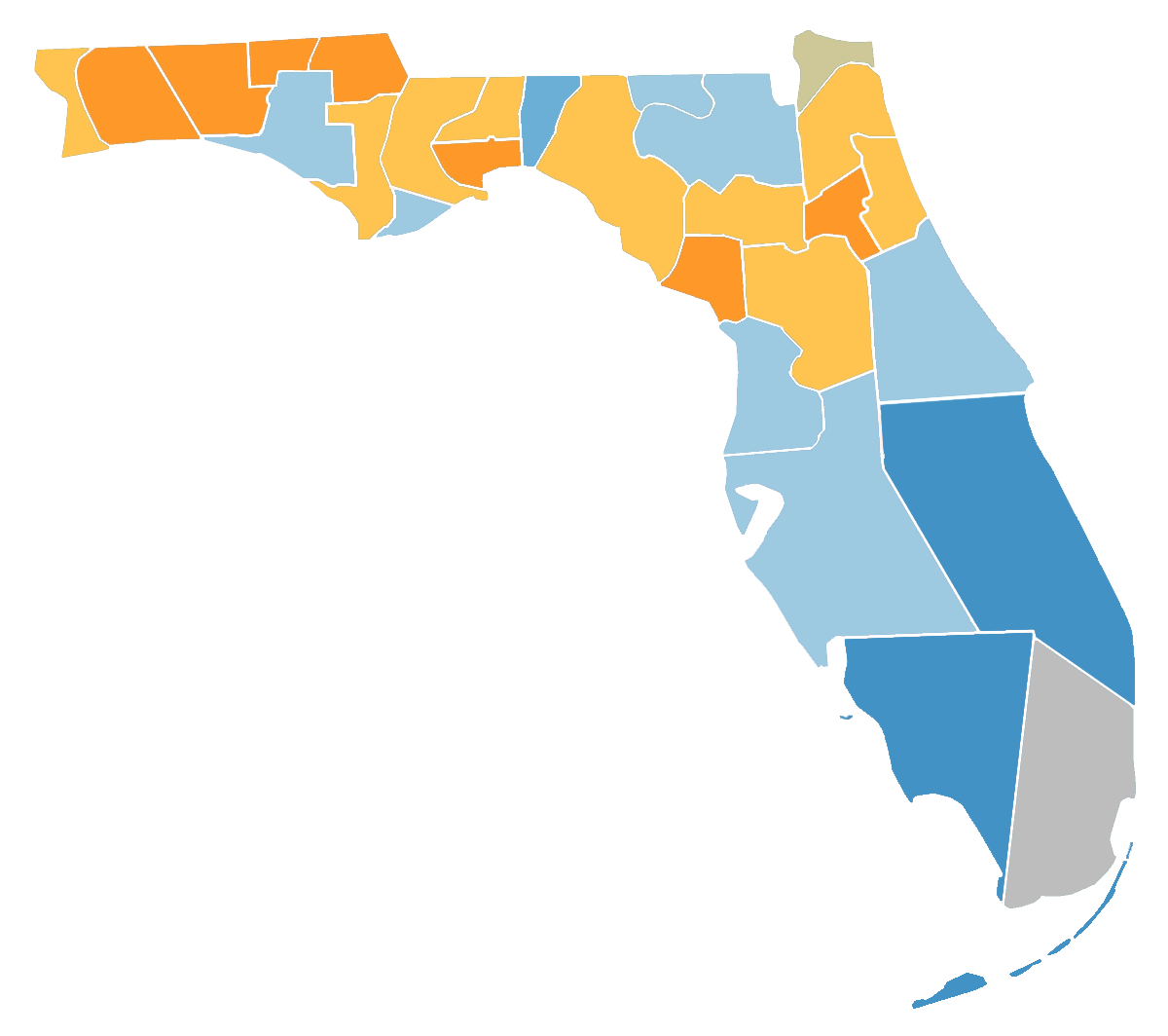
- County results Cabell: 50–59% 60–69% Kain: 50–59% 60–69% 70–79% Tie; No Votes
Representative before election
Edward Carrington Cabell
Whig
Elected Representative
Edward Carrington Cabell
Whig

The 1850 United States House of Representatives election in Florida was held on Monday, October 7, 1846, to elect the single United States Representative from the state of Florida, one from the state's single at-large congressional district, to represent Florida in the 32nd Congress. The election coincided with the elections of other offices, including the senatorial election and various state and local elections.

The winning candidate would serve a two-year term in the United States House of Representatives from March 4, 1851, to March 4, 1853.

== Candidates ==
=== Whig ===
==== Nominee ====
- Edward Carrington Cabell, incumbent U.S. representative

=== Democratic ===
==== Nominee ====
- John Beard, former North Carolina state senator

== Campaign ==
Despite the weakness of the Whig Party after the death of President Zachary Taylor, Beard was a source of great controversy. Beard, a staunch advocate of nullification while he was in North Carolina, became one of Florida's earliest secessionists. Beard claimed that with the admission of Texas to the United States, the South had enough power to break free through war.

Cabell ran on the complete opposite as Beard, arguing that the Compromise of 1850 will bring peace and an end to the slavery question. Many Floridians were also skeptical of breaking free from a Union they had just joined.

== General election ==
=== Results ===
Florida's at-large congressional district election, 1850
Party	Candidate	Votes	%	±%
Whig	Edward Carrington Cabell (inc.)	4,531	52.80%	−0.72%
Democratic	John Beard	4,050	47.20%	+0.72%
Majority		481	5.61%	−1.44%
Turnout		8,581	100.00%	
Whig hold				

=== Results by County ===
County	Edward Carrington Cabell Whig		John Beard Democratic		Total votes
County	%	#	%	#	Total votes
Alachua	50.82%	155	49.18%	150	305
Benton	44.07%	52	55.93%	66	118
Calhoun	52.41%	87	47.59%	79	166
Columbia	45.85%	287	54.15%	339	626
Dade	0%	0	0%	0	0
Duval	55.31%	297	44.69%	240	537
Escambia	54.14%	196	45.86%	166	362
Franklin	43.90%	90	56.10%	115	205
Gadsden	56.34%	462	43.66%	358	820
Hamilton	48.59%	155	51.41%	164	319
Hillsborough	40.54%	105	59.46%	154	259
Holmes	68.35%	108	31.65%	50	158
Jackson	64.82%	293	35.18%	159	452
Jefferson	37.79%	181	62.21%	298	479
Leon	52.80%	387	47.20%	346	733
Levy	64.62%	42	35.38%	23	65
Madison	59.51%	341	40.49%	232	573
Marion	56.46%	223	43.54%	172	395
Monroe	26.87%	54	73.13%	147	201
Nassau	50.0%	80	50.0%	80	160
Orange	43.86%	25	56.14%	32	57
Putnam	66.37%	75	33.63%	38	113
Santa Rosa	62.69%	168	37.31%	100	268
St. Johns	51.57%	181	48.43%	170	351
St. Lucie	30.0%	3	70.0%	7	10
Wakulla	62.20%	158	37.80%	96	254
Walton	60.87%	154	39.13%	99	253
Washington	40.36%	90	59.64%	133	223
No County Listed	68.91%	82	31.09%	37	119

== See also ==
- United States House of Representatives elections, 1850
