= 1845 United States House of Representatives election in Florida =

- May 26, 1845
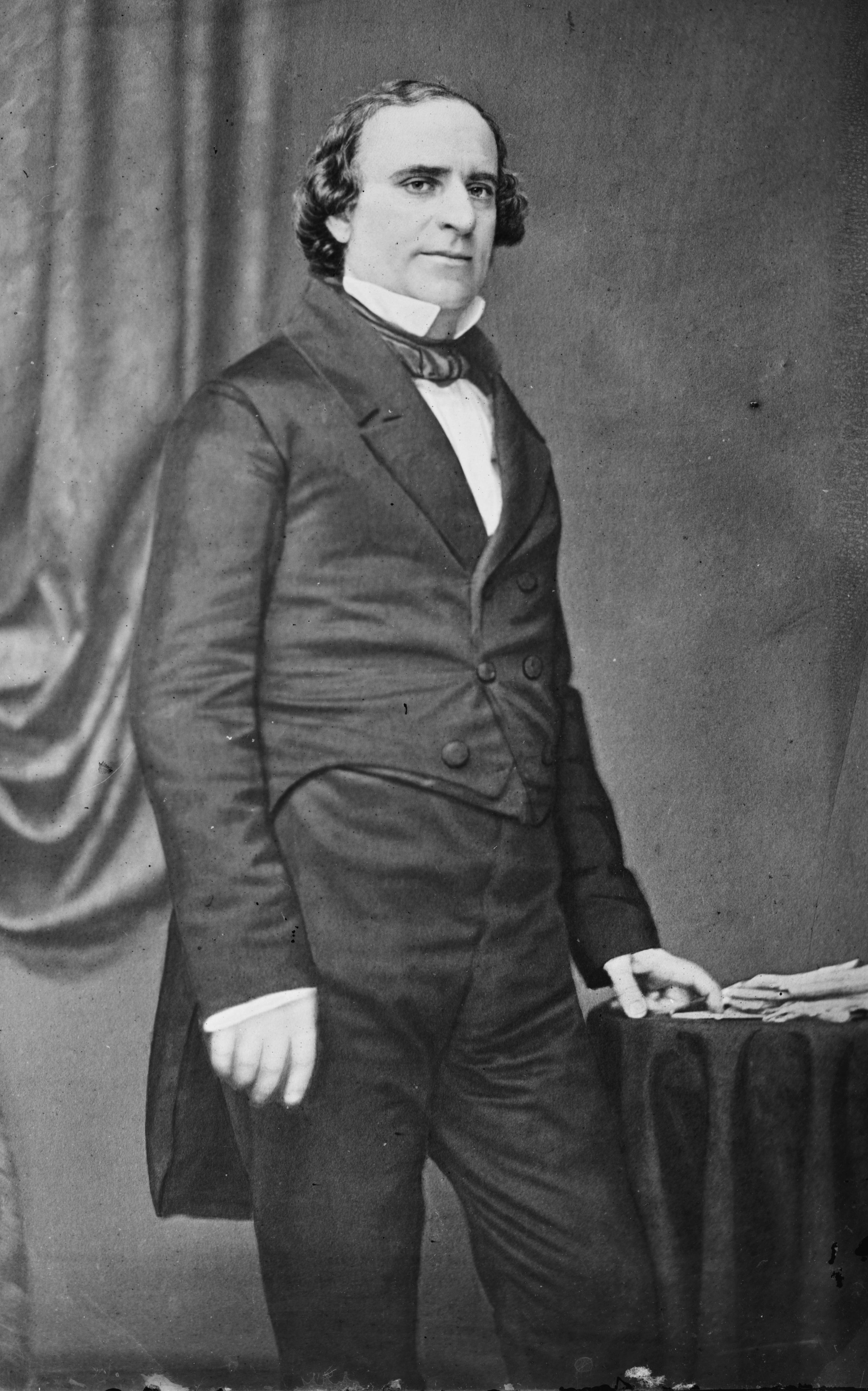

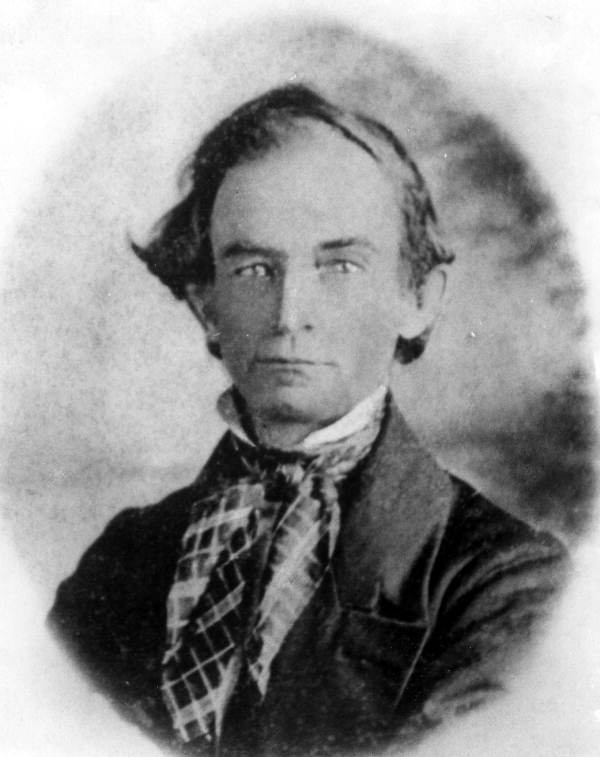
| Nominee | David Levy Yulee | Benjamin Alexander Putnam |
| Party | Democratic | Whig |
| Popular vote | 3,608 | 2,373 |
| Percentage | 60.32% | 39.68% |
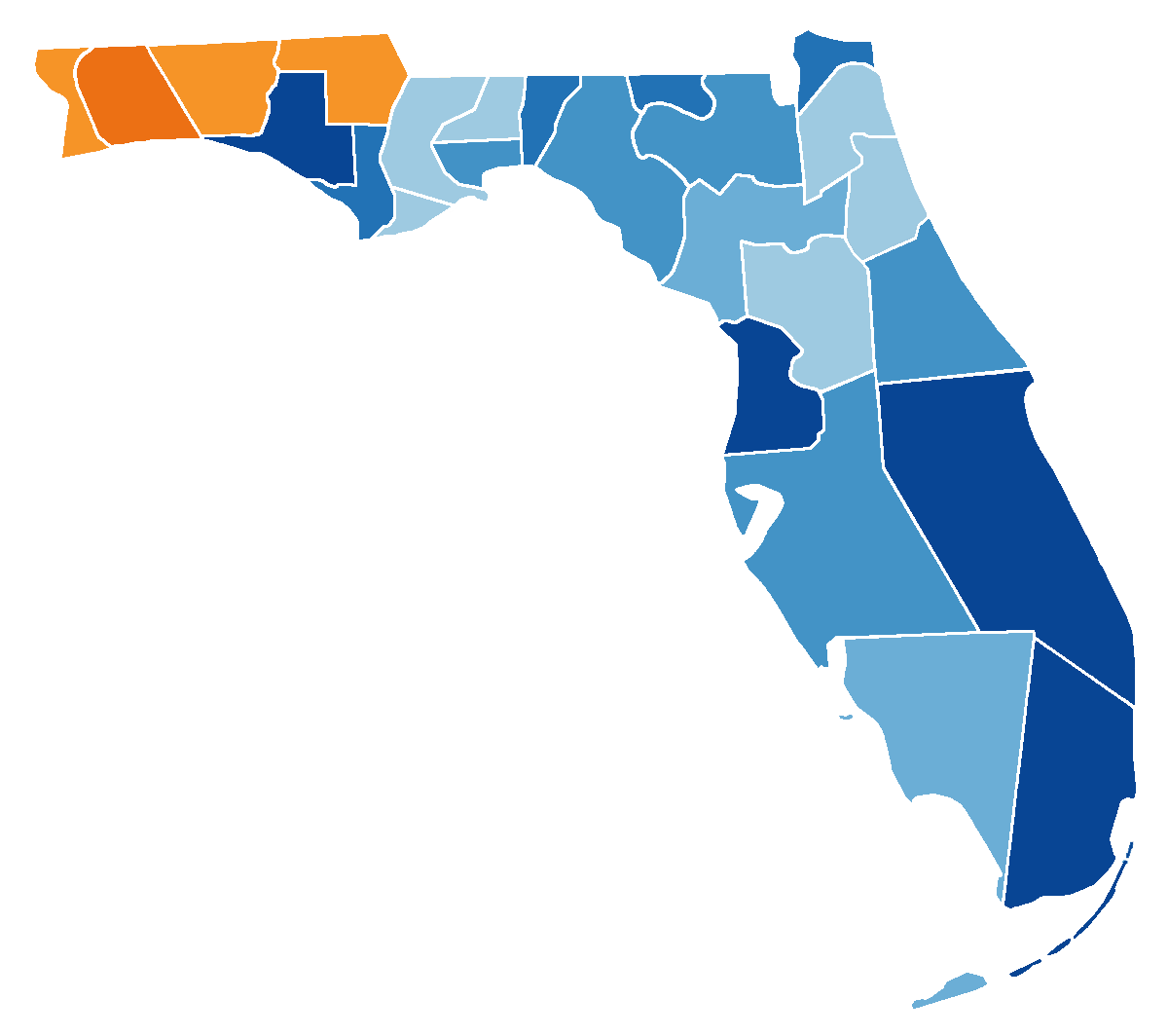
County results
Yulee
50–59%
60–69%
70–79%
80–89%
90–100%
Putnam
60–69%
70–79%
Elected Representative
David Levy Yulee
Democratic

The 1845 United States House of Representatives election in Florida was held on Monday, May 26, 1845, to elect the first United States representative from the state of Florida, one from the state's single at-large congressional district, to represent Florida in the 29th Congress. The election coincided with the elections of other offices, including the gubernatorial election, senatorial elections, and various state and local elections.

The winning candidate would have served a less-than-two-year term in the United States House of Representatives from July 1, 1845, to March 4, 1847.

== Background ==
Florida was admitted to the Union as a slave state on March 3, 1845, the last day of the 28th Congress. The state was not represented in that Congress. Florida held its elections on May 26, 1845.

== Candidates ==
=== Democratic ===
==== Nominee ====
- David Levy Yulee, former delegate for the Florida Territory's at-large congressional district

=== Whig ===
==== Nominee ====
- Benjamin Alexander Putnam, adjutant general during the Second Seminole War

== General election ==
=== Results ===
Florida's at-large congressional district election, 1845
| Party | Candidate | Votes | % | ±% |
|---|---|---|---|---|
| Democratic | David Levy Yulee | 3,608 | 60.32% | N/A |
| Whig | Benjamin Alexander Putnam | 2,373 | 39.68% | N/A |
| Majority | | 1,235 | 20.65% | N/A |
| Turnout | | 5,981 | 100.00% | |

=== Results by county ===
| County | David Levy Yulee Democratic | | Benjamin A. Putnam Whig | | Total votes |
| County | # | % | # | % | Total votes |
|---|---|---|---|---|---|
| Alachua | 193 | 67.25% | 94 | 32.75% | 287 |
| Benton | 73 | 90.12% | 8 | 9.88% | 81 |
| Calhoun | 57 | 85.07% | 10 | 14.93% | 67 |
| Columbia | 354 | 72.84% | 132 | 27.16% | 486 |
| Dade | 60 | 92.31% | 5 | 7.69% | 65 |
| Duval | 232 | 58.88% | 162 | 41.12% | 394 |
| Escambia | 105 | 39.33% | 162 | 60.67% | 267 |
| Franklin | 113 | 53.55% | 98 | 46.45% | 211 |
| Gadsden | 264 | 51.26% | 251 | 48.74% | 515 |
| Hamilton | 136 | 80.00% | 34 | 20.00% | 170 |
| Hillsborough | 88 | 74.58% | 30 | 25.42% | 118 |
| Jackson | 162 | 35.06% | 300 | 64.94% | 462 |
| Jefferson | 332 | 81.17% | 77 | 18.83% | 409 |
| Leon | 301 | 51.28% | 286 | 48.72% | 587 |
| Madison | 215 | 73.13% | 79 | 26.87% | 294 |
| Marion | 93 | 55.36% | 75 | 44.64% | 168 |
| Monroe | 156 | 68.42% | 72 | 31.58% | 228 |
| Nassau | 127 | 82.47% | 27 | 17.53% | 154 |
| Orange | 29 | 74.36% | 10 | 25.64% | 39 |
| Santa Rosa | 35 | 21.08% | 131 | 78.92% | 166 |
| St. Johns | 170 | 57.43% | 126 | 42.57% | 296 |
| St. Lucie | 16 | 94.12% | 1 | 5.88% | 17 |
| Wakulla | 119 | 70.00% | 51 | 30.00% | 170 |
| Walton | 101 | 37.69% | 167 | 62.31% | 268 |
| Washington | 77 | 93.90% | 5 | 39.88% | 82 |
| Totals | 3,608 | 60.12% | 2,393 | 39.88% | 6,001 |

== Aftermath ==
Because Yulee was jointly elected to both the U.S. House and the U.S. Senate and a person cannot hold both offices at the same time, he resigned from the House before taking his seat. A special election was held later in 1845 to elect his replacement, electing Whig Edward Carrington Cabell, though after a recount, Democrat William Henry Brockenbrough was found to be the winner instead.

== See also ==
- 1844 and 1845 United States House of Representatives elections
