= Augustus Maxwell =

American politician (1820–1903)

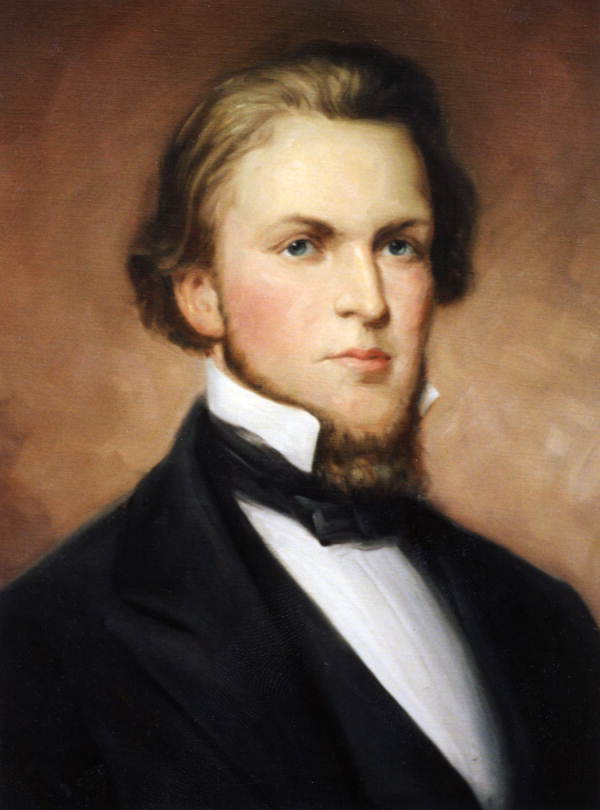

Chief Justice of the Florida Supreme Court
- In office July 1, 1887 – January 1889
- Preceded by: George G. McWhorter
- Succeeded by: George P. Raney

Justice of the Supreme Court of Florida
- In office 1887–1891
- Appointed by: Edward A. Perry
- Preceded by: George G. McWhorter
- Succeeded by: R. Fenwick Taylor
- In office 1865–1866
- Appointed by: William Marvin
- Preceded by: William A. Forward
- Succeeded by: Samuel J. Douglas

Judge of the First Judicial Circuit Court of Florida
- In office 1877–1885
- Appointed by: George Franklin Drew

Confederate States Senator from Florida
- In office February 18, 1862 – May 10, 1865
- Preceded by: Constituency established
- Succeeded by: Constituency abolished

Member of the U.S. House of Representatives from Florida's At-large district
- In office March 4, 1853 – March 3, 1857
- Preceded by: Edward Cabell
- Succeeded by: George Hawkins

Member of the Florida Senate from the 8th district
- In office 1849–1850

Secretary of State of Florida
- In office 1848–1849
- Governor: William Dunn Moseley
- Preceded by: James Tillinghast Archer
- Succeeded by: Charles W. Downing Jr.

Member of the Florida House of Representatives
- In office 1847-1848

Florida Attorney General
- In office July 14, 1846 – 1848
- Governor: William Dunn Moseley
- Preceded by: Joseph Branch
- Succeeded by: James T. Archer

Personal details
- Born: Augustus Emmet Maxwell; September 21, 1820 Elberton, Georgia, U.S.
- Died: May 5, 1903 (aged 82) Chipley, Florida, U.S.
- Party: Democratic
- Education: University of Virginia

Augustus Emmet Maxwell (September 21, 1820 – May 5, 1903) was an American lawyer and politician. Maxwell served in a number of political positions in the State of Florida including as one of Florida's senators to the Confederate States Congress, Florida Secretary of State, and as Chief Justice of the Florida Supreme Court.

== Early life and education ==
Maxwell was born in Elberton, Georgia, on September 21, 1820. In 1822, his family moved to Greene County, Alabama, where Maxwell would attend private school. Maxwell studied law at the University of Virginia, graduating in 1841 and was admitted into the Alabama State Bar in 1843. After practicing private law in Eutaw, Alabama, he moved to Tallahassee, Florida in 1845.

== Political career ==
Not long after arriving in Florida, Maxwell served as the second Florida Attorney General from 1846 until 1847. A Democrat, he was then served in the Florida House of Representatives from 1847 until 1848, when he resigned to become the second Florida Secretary of State, a position he held until 1849. Later in 1849, Maxwell was elected to the Florida Senate, but would resign a year later.

Maxwell, however, had developed a reputation in the state for his work on legislative committees, and, as a result, he was elected to the U.S. House of Representatives, representing Florida's at-large congressional district. He served in Congress for two terms, opting not to run for re-election in 1856. After he retired from Congress, Maxwell moved to Pensacola, Florida, where he served as President of the Alabama and Florida Railroad.

=== American Civil War ===
On January 10, 1861, the State of Florida voted to secede from the Union, becoming the third state to do so, following South Carolina and Mississippi. Maxwell's exact stance on secession remains unknown to historians, but his support from pro-secessionist state legislators seems to suggest that he was a secessionist. In November 1861, the Florida Legislature elected him to the Confederate States Senate, a position he would serve in until the end of the American Civil War.

Maxwell was regarded as an exceptionally practical Senator. Realizing that Florida's main contributions to the war effort were food and manufactured goods, he opposed increased taxes and conscription, both of which he felt would hurt Florida's production value. He also asked Confederate President Jefferson Davis to warn people against planting anything other than food.

Despite his practicality, Maxwell was known for his corruptness. In the Senate, he was a staunch supporter of President Davis' power grabs and did not oppose his expanding executive authority. In addition, Maxwell was named chairman of a special committee tasked with investigating the Confederate Department of the Navy, which was run by his close friend Stephen R. Mallory. Following the disastrous Capture of New Orleans, the Confederate Navy was blamed due to the failure of the ironclads. Hoping to forestall this, Mallory persuaded the Congress to investigate the conduct of the department instead. With the investigative committee stacked with Mallory's friends, including Maxwell and Representative Ethelbert Barksdale, the committee found no evidence of neglect or ineptitude.

On May 10, 1865, Union Brigadier General Edward McCook entered Tallahassee without incident. Ten days later, the American flag was hoisted over the Florida State Capitol and McCook read the Emancipation Proclamation on its steps, officially marking the surrender of Florida.

=== Later career ===
After the war, Maxwell remained a very popular figure in Florida. In late 1865, Governor William Marvin, a former judge appointed provisionally by President Andrew Johnson, appointed Maxwell to the Florida Supreme Court. Maxwell would only serve in this position for a year before his resignation, however. Maxwell formed a law partnership with Mallory in 1866, and resumed his presidency over the Alabama and Florida Railroad.

When Reconstruction ended following the Compromise of 1877, the Democrats retook control of Florida. As a result, Maxwell was appointed to the First Judicial Circuit Court of Florida by Governor George Franklin Drew that year. He served in this position until 1885, when he resigned in order to attend the state's Constitutional Convention. Maxwell and the other delegates rewrote the Carpetbag Constitution of 1868 and instead replaced it with a new Constitution which heavily restricted the rights of African-Americans.

In 1887, Governor Edward A. Perry appointed Maxwell as the eighth Chief Justice of the Florida Supreme Court. He would serve as Chief Justice until 1889, when George P. Raney was chosen to succeed him. Maxwell would remain on the Florida Supreme Court as an Associate Justice until 1891, when he officially stepped down.

== Later life and death ==
After his resignation, Maxwell returned to his private law practice until his retirement in 1896. Until his death in 1903, Maxwell lived with the family of his daughter's husband in Chipley, Florida.

== Burial and legacy ==
Maxwell is buried in St. John's Cemetery in Pensacola. Maxwell's son, Evelyn C. Maxwell, also served as a justice of the Florida Supreme Court. Maxwell's grandson, Emmett Wilson, later represented Florida in the U.S. House of Representatives. His father-in-law, Walker Anderson, and his son, Evelyn C. Maxwell, both also served on the Florida Supreme Court.

Legal offices
Preceded by Joseph Branch	Attorney General of Florida; 1846–1848	Succeeded by James T. Archer
U.S. House of Representatives
Preceded by Edward Cabell	Member of the U.S. House of Representatives from Florida's at-large congressional district 1853–1857	Succeeded by George Hawkins
Confederate States Senate
New constituency	Confederate States Senator (Class 2) from Florida; 1862–1865; Served alongside: James Baker	Constituency abolished
