= 1845 Florida gubernatorial election =

- May 26, 1845
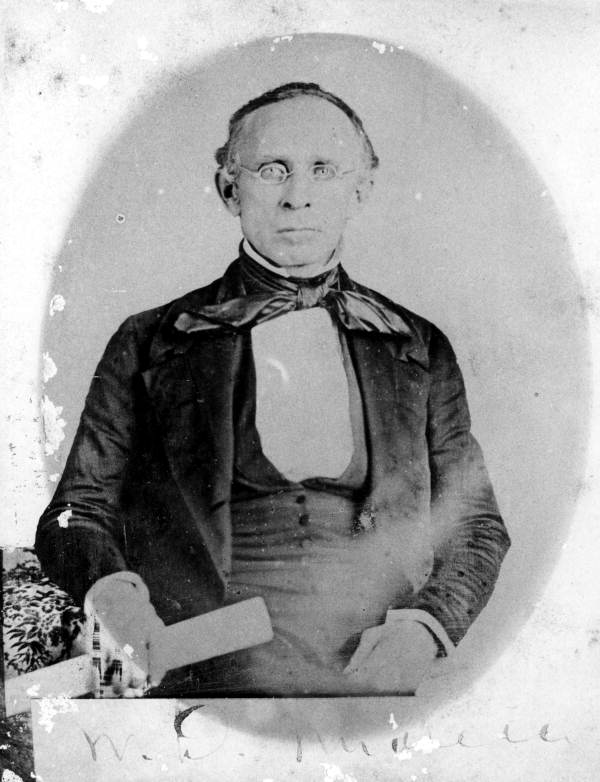

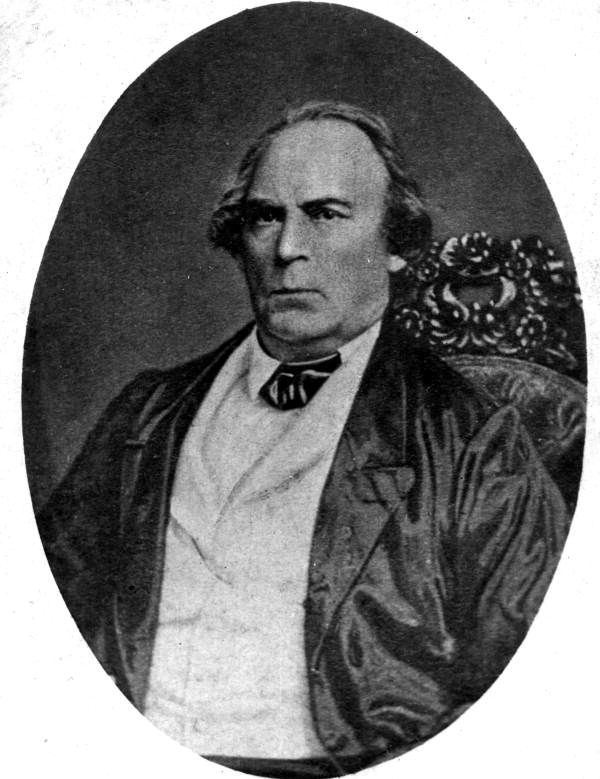
Nominee	William Dunn Moseley	Richard Keith Call
Party	Democratic	Whig
Popular vote	3,292	2,679
Percentage	55.14%	44.86%
County results
Moseley:
50–60%
60–70%
70–80%
80–90%
>90%
Call:
50–60%
60–70%
70–80%
Governor before election
John Branch
(as territorial governor)
Nonpartisan
Elected Governor
William Dunn Moseley
Democrat

The 1845 Florida gubernatorial election was held on May 26, 1845, to elect the first governor of Florida. Democratic nominee William Dunn Moseley defeated Whig nominee Richard Keith Call with 55.14% of the vote.

== General election ==
=== Candidates ===
- William D. Moseley, Democratic
- Richard K. Call, Whig

=== Results ===
1845 Florida gubernatorial election
Party	Candidate	Votes	%
Democratic	William Dunn Moseley	3,292	55.14
Whig	Richard Keith Call	2,679	44.86
Total votes		5,971	100

==== Results by county ====
County	William Dunn Moseley Democratic		Richard Keith Call Whig		Total votes
County	#	%	#	%	Total votes
Alachua*	193	67.96%	91	23.04%	284
Benton	78	95.12%	4	4.88%	82
Calhoun	62	92.54%	5	7.46%	67
Columbia	340	72.65%	128	27.35%	468
Dade	60	92.31%	5	7.69%	65
Duval	235	61.86%	156	38.14%	391
Escambia	96	35.96%	171	64.04%	267
Franklin	113	51.6%	106	48.4%	219
Gadsden	230	45.19%	279	54.81%	509
Hamilton	126	74.12%	44	25.88%	170
Hillsborough	74	66.07%	38	33.93%	112
Jackson	130	28.14%	332	71.86%	462
Jefferson	256	63.21%	149	36.79%	405
Leon	269	45.59%	321	54.41%	590
Madison	174	58.39%	124	41.61%	298
Marion	94	55.95%	74	44.05%	168
Monroe	157	68.26%	73	31.74%	230
Nassau	129	84.87%	23	15.13%	152
Orange**	28	73.68%	10	26.32%	38
Santa Rosa	29	17.47%	137	82.53%	166
St. Johns	171	61.51%	107	38.49%	278
St. Lucie	16	94.12%	1	5.88%	17
Wakulla	88	53.01%	78	46.99%	166
Walton	64	24.06%	202	75.94%	266
Washington	71	86.59%	11	13.41%	82
Actual Totals	3,283	55.13%	2,669	44.87%	5,952
Official Totals	3,292	55.16%	2,679	44.84%	5,971
*Newly formed Levy County returns was included in count. **Votes was counted under old name of Mosquito County.

== See also ==
- 1845 United States House of Representatives election in Florida
