= Joseph Branch (Florida politician) =

First Attorney General of Florida (1817–1867)

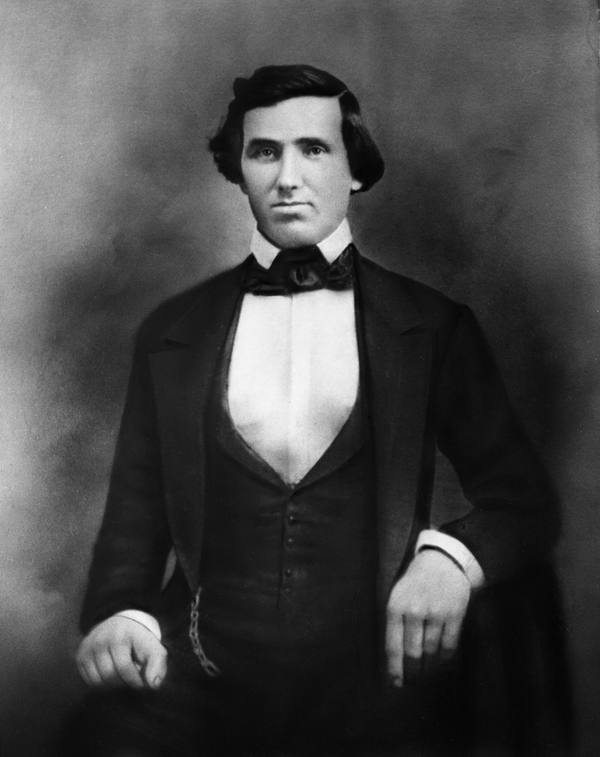

1st Florida Attorney General
- In office July 26, 1845 – July 14, 1846
- Governor: William Dunn Moseley
- Preceded by: Office created
- Succeeded by: Augustus Maxwell

Personal details
- Born: August 3, 1817
- Died: November 23, 1867 (aged 50)
- Political party: Democratic
- Spouse(s): Annie Pillow Martin; Mary Jones Polk
- Children: 6
- Occupation: Lawyer

Joseph Branch (August 3, 1817 – November 23, 1867), also referred to as Josephus Branch, was an American lawyer and politician who served as the first Florida Attorney General.

== Biography ==
Branch was born in Enfield, North Carolina on August 3, 1817.

Branch was a member of the Branch family, being the nephew of North Carolina Governor John Branch (who also served as the last territorial Governor of Florida) and the brother of Confederate Army Brigadier General Lawrence O'Bryan Branch.

Branch had been a lawyer in the city of Tallahassee in the Florida Territory in the 1830s and 1840s. In 1841 he served in the Territorial Legislature. Kenneth Bembry disputed his election. When Florida received statehood in 1845, Branch was appointed the first Florida Attorney General by Governor William Dunn Moseley. He served in this position until July 14, 1846.

Branch was twice married. With his first wife, Annie Pillow Martin, Branch had two children: George Martin and Henry Lewis. With his second wife, Mary Jones Polk, Branch had four children: Mary Polk, Lawrence O'Bryan, Lucia Eugenia, and Joseph Gerald Branch. The latter would go on to become a member of the Florida Legislature, as well as a successful planter in Desha County, Arkansas until his assassination in 1867 on his plantation. Branch died on November 23, 1867, at the age of 50.

== Sources ==
- "Joseph Branch Papers". University Libraries: Wilson Special Collections Library.
