= 1845 Florida's at-large congressional district special election =

- October 6, 1845
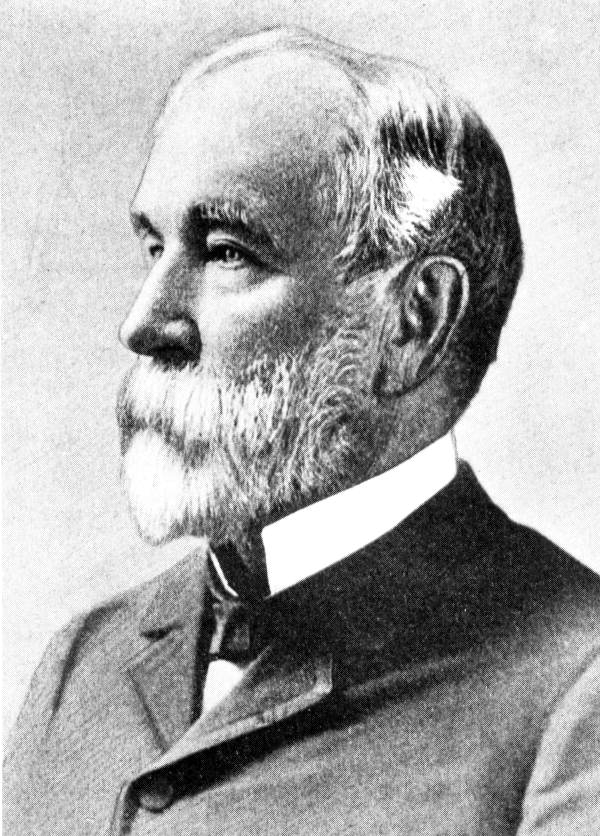
Nominee	Edward Carrington Cabell	William Henry Brockenbrough
Party	Whig	Democratic
Popular vote	2,523	2,472
Percentage	50.51%	49.49%
Representative-elect before election
David Levy Yulee
Democratic
Elected U.S. Representative
Edward Carrington Cabell
Whig

1845 Florida's at-large congressional district special election recount
- January 24, 1846
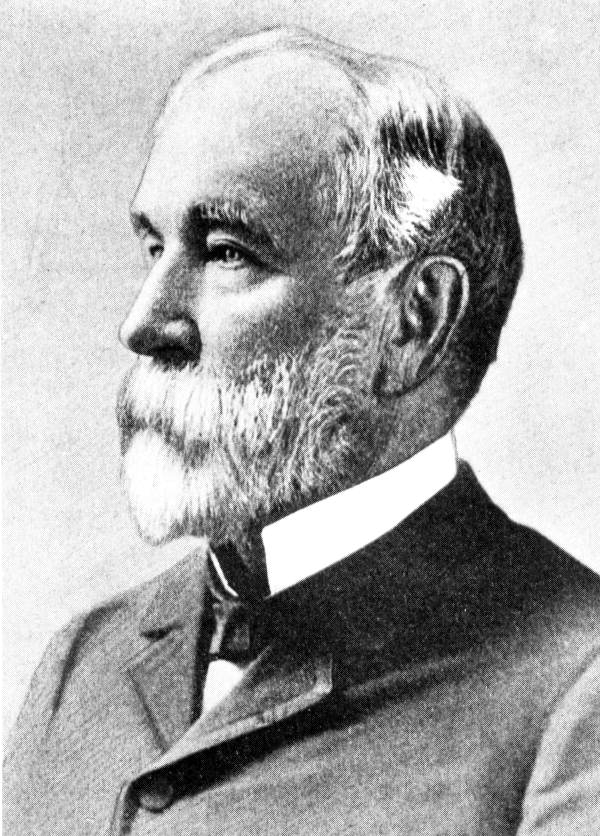
Nominee	William Henry Brockenbrough	Edward Carrington Cabell
Party	Democratic	Whig
Popular vote	2,669	2,632
Percentage	50.35%	49.65%
- County results Brockenbrough: 50–60% 60–70% 70–80% 80–90% >90% Cabell: 50–60% 60–70% 70–80% No Votes
Representative before election
Edward Carrington Cabell
Whig
Elected Representative
William Henry Brockenbrough
Democratic

A special election to the United States House of Representatives for Florida's at-large congressional district was held October 6, 1845.

The winning candidate would serve a less-than-two-year term in the United States House of Representatives to represent Florida in the 29th Congress from October 6, 1845, to March 4, 1847.

The election was initially called for the Whig candidate, Edward Carrington Cabell, and Cabell was seated in the House of Representatives. However, a recount found the winner to actually be the Democratic candidate, William Henry Brockenbrough. Brockenbrough was seated immediately on January 24, 1846.

== Background ==
In the 1845 congressional election, David Levy Yulee, a Democrat, was elected to the United States House of Representatives. However, Yulee was jointly elected by the Florida Legislature to the United States Senate, and so resigned from the House of Representatives before taking his seat in order to take his seat in the Senate.

== Candidates ==
=== Democratic ===
==== Nominee ====
- William Henry Brockenbrough, former territorial senator

=== Whig ===
==== Nominee ====
- Edward Carrington Cabell, lawyer

== General election ==
=== Original results ===
1845 Florida's at-large congressional district special election
Party	Candidate	Votes	%	±%
Whig	Edward Carrington Cabell	2,523	50.51%	+1.23%
Democratic	William Henry Brockenbrough	2,472	49.49%	−1.23%
Majority		51	1.02%	−19.63%
Turnout		4,995	100.00%	
Whig gain from Democratic				

=== Recount results ===
1845 Florida's at-large congressional district special election recount
Party	Candidate	Votes	%	±%
Democratic	William Henry Brockenbrough	2,669	50.35%	+0.86%
Whig	Edward Carrington Cabell (incumbent)	2,632	49.65%	−0.86%
Majority		37	0.70%	−0.32%
Turnout		5,301	100.00%	
Democratic gain from Whig				

== See also ==
- 1844 and 1845 United States House of Representatives elections
- 1846 and 1847 United States House of Representatives elections
