= 1848 United States presidential election in Florida =

- November 7, 1848
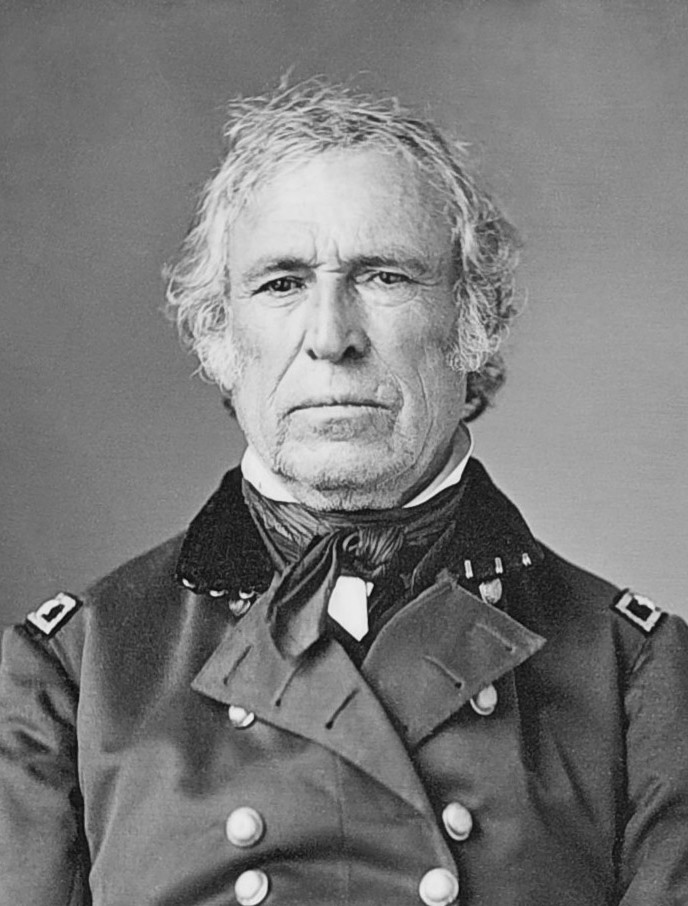

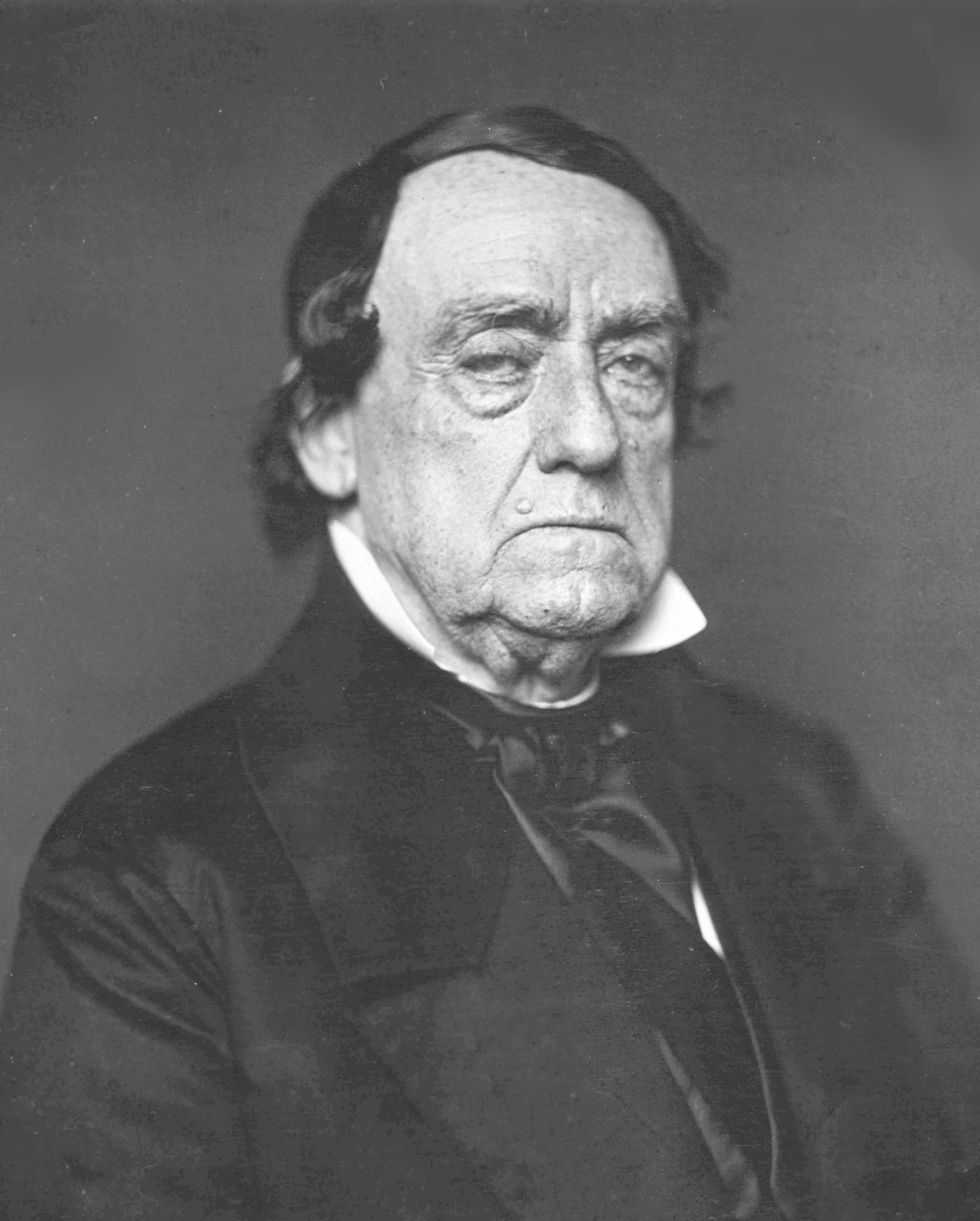
| Nominee | Zachary Taylor | Lewis Cass |
| Party | Whig | Democratic |
| Home state | Louisiana | Michigan |
| Running mate | Millard Fillmore | William O. Butler |
| Electoral vote | 3 | 0 |
| Popular vote | 4,120 | 3,083 |
| Percentage | 57.20% | 42.80% |
County results
Taylor
50–60%
60–70%
70–80%
80–90%
Cass
50–60%
70–80%
90–100%
President before election
James K. Polk
Democratic
Elected President
Zachary Taylor
Whig

The 1848 United States presidential election in Florida took place on November 7, 1848, as part of the 1848 United States presidential election. Voters chose three representatives, or electors to the Electoral College, who voted for President and Vice President. This was the first time Florida participated in a U.S. presidential election since its admission into the Union on March 3, 1845.

Florida voted for the Whig candidate, Zachary Taylor, over Democratic candidate Lewis Cass. Taylor won Florida by a margin of 14.40%.

== Results ==
1848 United States presidential election in Florida
| Party | Candidate | Running mate | Popular vote | | Electoral vote | |
| Party | Candidate | Running mate | Count | % | Count | % |
|---|---|---|---|---|---|---|
| Whig | Zachary Taylor of Louisiana | Millard Fillmore of New York | 4,120 | 57.20% | 3 | 100.00% |
| Democratic | Lewis Cass of Michigan | William O. Butler of Kentucky | 3,083 | 42.80% | 0 | 0.00% |
| Total | | | 7,203 | 100.00% | 3 | 100.00% |

== See also ==
- United States presidential elections in Florida
- 1848 United States House of Representatives election in Florida
- 1848 Florida gubernatorial election
