= 1845 Virginia gubernatorial election =

- December 10, 1845
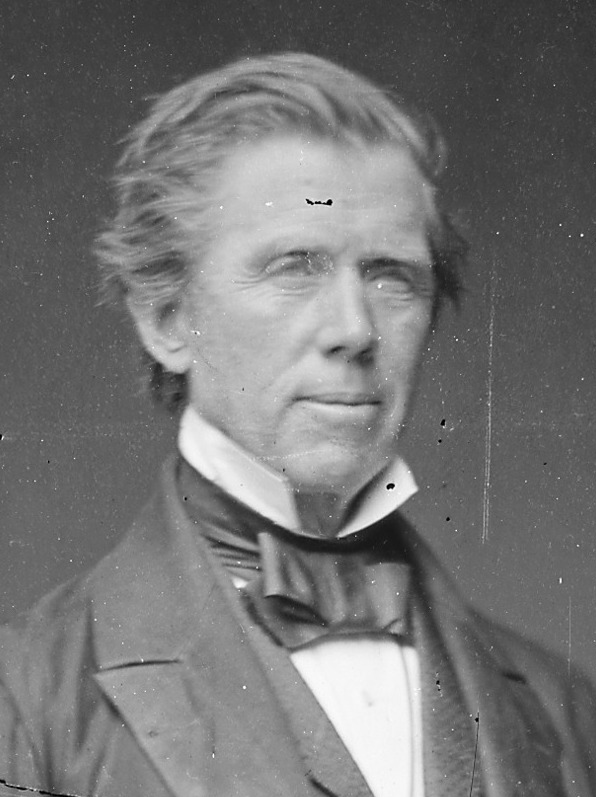

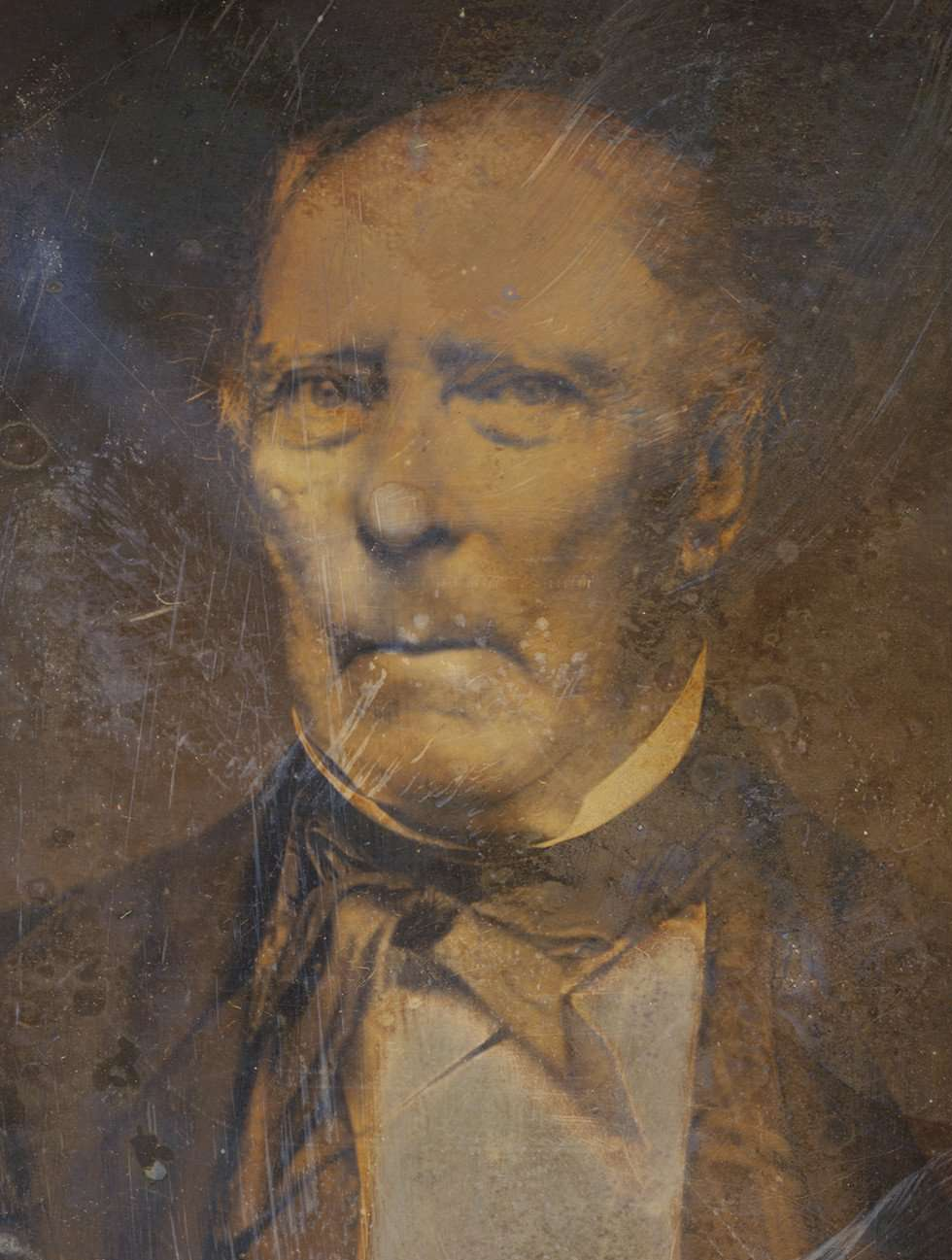

Nominee	William Smith	John Brockenbrough	Valentine W. Southall
Party	Democratic	Democratic	Whig
1st ballot	94	40	12
Governor before election
James McDowell
Democratic
Elected Governor
William Smith
Democratic

A gubernatorial election was held in Virginia on December 10, 1845. The Democratic former U.S. representative from Virginia's 13th congressional district William Smith defeated Democratic businessperson John Brockenbrough.

Democrats swept the 1845 state elections, winning large majorities in both chambers of the legislature. The Whig Party was divided over Texas annexation and further demoralized by their defeat. Some Whigs hoped to split the incoming Democratic majority by supporting Brockenbrough, a member of the Richmond Junto, for governor against the regular Democratic candidate. Smith first hoped to be elected to the United States Senate, but was passed over for the caucus nomination in favor of Isaac S. Pennybacker. Instead, Smith was selected as the party's candidate for governor. Privately, Smith was reluctant to accept the office, as the salary was too small to comfortably cover his expenses.

The election was conducted by the Virginia General Assembly in joint session. Smith was elected with a majority on the first ballot.

== General election ==
1845 Virginia gubernatorial election
Party	Candidate	First ballot	
Party	Candidate	Count	Percent
Democratic	William Smith	94	58.75
Democratic	John Brockenbrough	40	25.00
Whig	Valentine W. Southall	12	7.50
Whig	James Lyons	2	1.25
Whig	William C. Rives	2	1.25
Democratic	Andrew Stevenson	2	1.25
Whig	Edmund Broadus	1	0.62
Democratic	William F. Gordon	1	0.62
Whig	Chapman Johnson	1	0.62
Democratic	James M. Mason	1	0.62
Whig	William B. Preston	1	0.62
Whig	Robert Eden Scott	1	0.62
Whig	George W. Summers	1	0.62
Democratic	William P. Taylor	1	0.62
Total		160	100.00

== Bibliography ==
- Dent, Lynwood Miller (1974). The Virginia Democratic Party, 1824-1847. (Volumes I and II) (PhD thesis). [Baton Rouge]: Louisiana State University.
- Virginia (1845a). Journal of the House of Delegates [...]. Richmond.
- Virginia (1845b). Journal of the Senate [...]. Richmond.
