= 1845 Texas lieutenant gubernatorial election =

- December 15, 1845
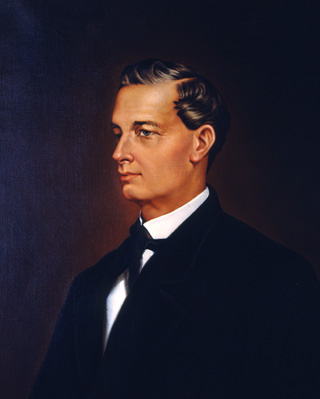

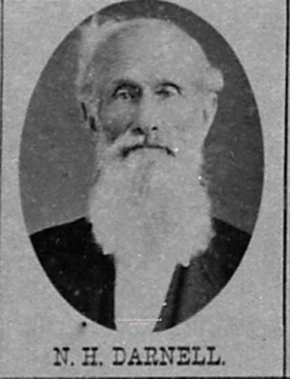
Nominee	Albert C. Horton	N. H. Darnell
Party	Independent	Independent
Popular vote	4,204	4,084
Percentage	50.7%	49.3%
Lieutenant Governor-elect
Albert C. Horton

The 1845 Texas lieutenant gubernatorial election was held on December 15, 1845, to elect the first lieutenant governor of Texas. The election was held in preparation for the annexation of Texas by the United States. As such the election actually predated Texas' entry into the Union by 14 days. Albert Clinton Horton was elected over Nicholas Henry Darnell and became the first lieutenant governor of the new state.

== General election ==
Organized political parties did not exist in the Republic, with factions generally revolving around presidents Sam Houston and Mirabeau B. Lamar. The first political party in state history, the Democrats, would not be organized for another year and both candidates ran nominally independent campaigns.

Initial election returns showed that Darnell was leading in the polls. When the new legislature met in February 1846, Darnell was certified as the winner of the election based on these preliminary results. However Darnell refused to take the oath of office until the remaining votes in South Texas were returned. When the remaining votes were counted, Horton had taken the lead and he was declared the winner on May 1, 1846. Horton was sworn in on May 2, 1846.

=== Candidates ===
- Albert Clinton Horton, delegate at the 1845 statehood convention, former senator in the Congress of the Texas Republic, candidate for Vice President in the 1838 Texas Presidential election, former representative in the Alabama state legislature
- Nicholas Henry Darnell, delegate at the 1845 statehood convention, Speaker of the House of the Congress of the Texas Republic, member-elect of the Tennessee General Assembly

=== Results ===
1845 Texas lieutenant gubernatorial election
Party	Candidate	Votes	%
Independent	Albert Clinton Horton	4,204	50.72%
Independent	Nicholas Henry Darnell	4,084	49.28%
Total votes		8,288	100.00%

== See also ==
- 1844 Republic of Texas presidential election, the last presidential election in the Republic of Texas
