= Charles Merian Cooper =

American politician

Charles M. Cooper
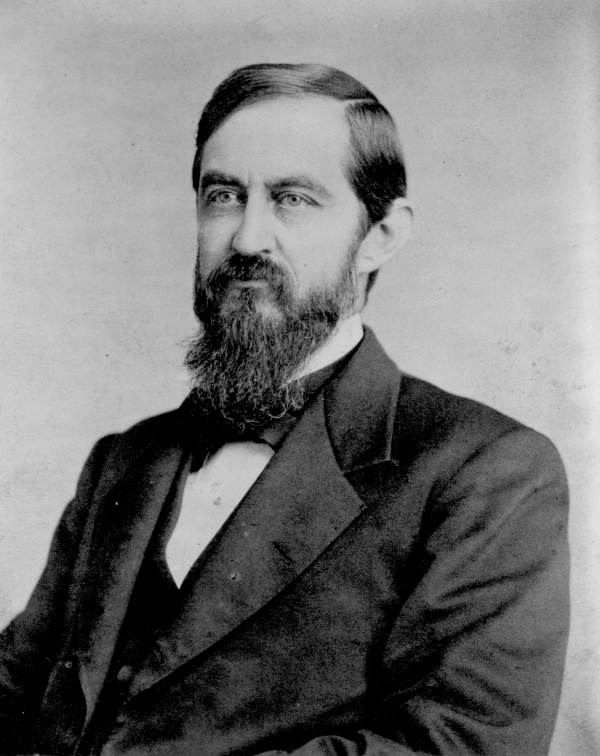

Member of the U.S. House of Representatives from Florida's 2nd district
- In office March 4, 1893 – March 3, 1897
- Preceded by: Robert Bullock
- Succeeded by: Robert Wyche Davis

15th Florida Attorney General
- In office January 13, 1885 – January 8, 1889
- Governor: Edward A. Perry
- Preceded by: George P. Raney
- Succeeded by: William Bailey Lamar

Personal details
- Born: Charles Merian Cooper; January 16, 1856 Athens, Georgia, US
- Died: November 14, 1923 (aged 67) Jacksonville, Florida, US
- Party: Democratic
- Spouse: Rosa Leonardi (m. 1880)
- Children: 2
- Education: Gainesville Academy
- Occupation: Attorney

Charles Merian Cooper (January 16, 1856 – November 14, 1923) was an American attorney and politician who served two terms as a U.S. representative from Florida from 1893 until 1897.

== Early life and education ==
Cooper was born on January 16, 1856, in Athens, Georgia. His father, Charles Phillip Cooper, served as a United States Treasury Department agent until the American Civil War, when he was appointed to help organize the Confederate States Treasury Department. In 1864, he and his family moved to Jacksonville, Florida in order to escape Union forces.

Cooper studied law at Gainesville Academy, graduating in 1867. He was accepted into the Florida Bar in the same year, and began a private practice in St. Augustine, Florida.

== Political career ==
In 1880, Cooper, a Democrat, was elected to the Florida House of Representatives, representing St. John's County. He served until 1884, when he was elected to the Florida Senate from St. John's County.

=== State Attorney General ===
On January 13, 1885, Cooper was appointed as the 15th Florida Attorney General by Governor Edward A. Perry. Cooper served until 1889 when his term expired. Later that year, he was one of three commissioners appointed to revise the state's statutes.

=== Congress ===
In 1892, the Democratic U.S. Representative from Florida's 2nd district, Robert Bullock, did not seek reelection. Cooper successfully received the Democratic nomination and defeated his opponent, Populist State Representative Austin S. Mann, with 76% of the vote. Cooper successfully sought reelection in 1894, defeating Populist Montholom Atkinson with 80% of the vote. The Republican Party did not nominate any candidates in either of the races.

=== Retirement from House ===
Cooper did not run for reelection in 1896 and returned to his private practice in Jacksonville.

== Personal life ==
In 1880, Cooper married Rosa Leonardi. They had two children, Charles Philip and James Jackson Gignilliat.

== Death ==
Cooper died in Jacksonville on November 14, 1923.

== Electoral history ==
1894 United States House of Representatives election in Florida Florida 2nd district
Party	Candidate	Votes	%	±%
Democratic	Charles Merian Cooper (inc.)	9,229	79.82%	+3.85%
Populist	Montholom Atkinson	2,334	20.19%	−3.85%
Majority		6895	59.63%	+7.70%
Turnout		11,563		

1892 United States House of Representatives election in Florida Florida 2nd district
Party	Candidate	Votes	%	±%
Democratic	Charles Merian Cooper	14,668	75.97%	+17.22%
Populist	Austin S. Mann	4,641	24.04%	N/A
Majority		10,027	51.93%	+34.42%
Turnout		19,309		

Legal offices
Preceded by George P. Raney	Attorney General of Florida; 1885–1889	Succeeded by William Bailey Lamar
U.S. House of Representatives
Preceded by Robert Bullock	Member of the U.S. House of Representatives from Florida's 2nd congressional district 1893–1897	Succeeded by Robert Wyche Davis
