= Florida's at-large congressional district =

Former congressional district

Coordinates: 30°N 83°W

- Obsolete district
- Created: 1845; 1870; 1910; 1930; 1940
- Eliminated: 1870; 1910; 1930; 1940
- Years active: 1845-1875; 1913-1915; 1933-1937; 1943-1945

Florida's at-large congressional district may refer to a few different occasions when a statewide at-large district was used for elections to the United States House of Representatives from Florida. The district is obsolete.

Prior to Florida's admittance as a state of the Union in 1845, congressional delegates for Florida Territory were elected from Florida Territory's at-large congressional district. The first elected U.S. representative from the state was installed on October 6, 1845.

A single representative was elected from the state from after statehood until 1873. A second representative was elected for 1 term beginning in 1873. District representation began in 1875.

Subsequently, on occasion an at-large representative would be elected in addition to representatives being elected from districts. This would occur 1913-1915, 1933–1937, and 1943-1945.

The district became obsolete January 3, 1945.

== List of members representing the district ==
After the 1870 census, a second seat was apportioned to Florida. Briefly, for the 43rd Congress, a second at-large seat was used. After that, there were two geographic districts created.

Years	Cong ress	Seat A			Seat B		
Years	Cong ress	Member	Party	Electoral history	Member	Party	Electoral history
July 1, 1845 – October 6, 1845	29th	Vacant		Representative-elect David Levy Yulee declined to serve after his election to the U.S. Senate.	Seat inactive		
October 6, 1845 – January 24, 1846	29th	Edward C. Cabell (Tallahassee)	Whig	Elected to fill Levy Yulee's term. Lost contested election.	Seat inactive		
January 24, 1846 – March 3, 1847	29th	William Henry Brockenbrough (Tallahassee)	Democratic	Successfully contested election. Retired.	Seat inactive		
March 4, 1847 – March 3, 1853	30th 31st 32nd	Edward C. Cabell (Tallahassee)	Whig	Elected in 1846. Re-elected in 1848. Re-elected in 1850. Lost re-election.	Seat inactive		
March 4, 1853 – March 3, 1857	33rd 34th	Augustus Maxwell (Tallahassee)	Democratic	Elected in 1852. Re-elected in 1854. Retired.	Seat inactive		
March 4, 1857 – January 21, 1861	35th 36th	George S. Hawkins (Pensacola)	Democratic	Elected in 1856. Re-elected in 1858. Re-elected in 1860. Withdrew ahead of secession.	Seat inactive		
January 21, 1861 – July 1, 1868	36th 37th 38th 39th 40th	Vacant		U.S. Civil War	Seat inactive		
July 1, 1868 – March 3, 1871	40th 41st	Charles M. Hamilton (Jacksonville)	Republican	Elected in 1868. Lost renomination.	Seat inactive		
March 4, 1871 – January 29, 1873	42nd	Josiah T. Walls (Gainesville)	Republican	Lost contested election.	Seat inactive		
January 29, 1873 – March 3, 1873	42nd	Silas L. Niblack (Gainesville)	Democratic	Successfully contested election. Lost re-election.	Seat inactive		
March 4, 1873 – January 25, 1875	43rd	William J. Purman (Tallahassee)	Republican	Elected in 1872. Resigned.	Josiah T. Walls (Gainesville)	Republican	Elected in 1872. Redistricted to the 2nd district.
January 25, 1875 – March 3, 1875	43rd	Vacant			Josiah T. Walls (Gainesville)	Republican	Elected in 1872. Redistricted to the 2nd district.
March 4, 1875 – March 3, 1913	44th 45th 46th 47th 48th 49th 50th 51st 52nd 53rd 54th 55th 56th 57th 58th 59th 60th 61st 62nd	Seat inactive			Seat inactive		
March 4, 1913 – March 3, 1915	63rd	Claude L'Engle (Jacksonville)	Democratic	Elected in 1912. Lost renomination.	Seat inactive		
March 3, 1915 – March 3, 1933	64th 65th 66th 67th 68th 69th 70th 71st 72nd	Seat inactive			Seat inactive		
March 4, 1933 – January 3, 1937	73rd 74th	William J. Sears (Jacksonville)	Democratic	Elected in 1932. Re-elected in 1934. Lost renomination.	Seat inactive		
January 3, 1937 – January 3, 1943	75th 76th 77th	Seat inactive			Seat inactive		
January 3, 1943 – November 25, 1944	78th	Robert A. Green (Starke)	Democratic	Redistricted from the 2nd district and re-elected in 1942. Resigned to join the U.S. Navy.	Seat inactive		
November 26, 1944 – January 3, 1945	78th	Vacant			Seat inactive		
January 3, 1945		Seats eliminated					
