= Robert Bullock =

American politician

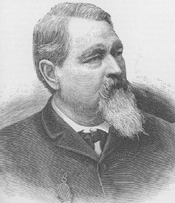
- Born: December 8, 1828; Greenville, North Carolina
- Died: July 27, 1905 (aged 76); Ocala, Florida
- Burial place: Evergreen Cemetery
- Military career
- Allegiance: United States of America; Confederate States of America
- Branch: United States Army; Confederate States Army
- Service years: 1856–1858 (USA); 1861–1865 (CSA)
- Rank: Captain (USA); Brigadier General (CSA)
- Commands: 7th Florida Infantry Regiment; Florida Brigade, AoT
- Conflicts: Seminole Wars; American Civil War
- Other work: U.S. Congressman

Robert Bullock (December 8, 1828 – July 27, 1905) was an American lawyer, judge, state legislator, and United States representative from Florida. He was a brigadier general in the Confederate States Army during the American Civil War.

== Early life and career ==
Born in Greenville, North Carolina, he attended the common schools. He moved to Fort King, Florida, in 1844, which was then a United States government post, near the present city of Ocala, Florida. He taught in the first school in Sumter County, Florida.

== Seminole uprising ==
Bullock was commissioned by the governor of Florida in 1856 as a captain to raise a mounted company of volunteers for the suppression of the Seminole uprising. The company was mustered into the service of the United States and served 18 months, until the cessation of hostilities.

== Civil War ==
Bullock entered the Confederate Army as captain in the 7th Florida Infantry in 1861, and served until the close of the war. He was promoted to lieutenant colonel in 1863 and to brigadier general in 1865 to date from November 29, 1864. Bullock took part in the Battle of Chickamauga, the Atlanta campaign, and the Franklin-Nashville Campaign, where he was severely wounded.

== Postwar career ==
After the war, Bullock studied law, was admitted to the bar in 1866, and began practice in Marion County. He served as judge of probate court 1866-1868. He was a member of the Florida House of Representatives in 1879. He was again clerk of the circuit court of Marion County from 1881 to 1889.

== Congress ==
He was elected as a Democrat to the Fifty-first and Fifty-second Congresses (March 4, 1889 – March 3, 1893). Bullock was not a candidate for renomination in 1892. He was succeeded by Charles Merian Cooper.

After leaving Congress, he engaged in agricultural pursuits. He was elected judge of Marion County in 1903 and served until his death in Ocala, Florida in 1905.

He was buried in Evergreen Cemetery.

== See also ==
- List of American Civil War generals (Confederate)

U.S. House of Representatives
Preceded by Charles Dougherty	Member of the U.S. House of Representatives from Florida's 2nd congressional district 1889–1893	Succeeded by Charles Merian Cooper
