= Joe Branch =

Stream in Hickman County, Tennessee, U.S.

Coordinates: 35.760901°N 87.567239°W

Joe Branch is a stream in Hickman County, Tennessee, in the United States. It is a tributary to Beaverdam Creek.

Joe Branch was named for Joe McCann, a pioneer who settled at the creek in the 1820s.

== See also ==
- List of rivers of Tennessee
