= 1845 Luxembourg general election =

Partial general elections were held in Luxembourg in May 1845, electing members of the Assembly of Estates.

== Results ==
Canton	Members elected
Luxembourg	Gellé
Luxembourg	Ferdinand Pescatore
Luxembourg	Simons
Esch-sur-Alzette	Henri Motté
Esch-sur-Alzette	François-Xavier Wurth-Paquet
Esch-sur-Alzette	Victor de Tornaco
Mersch	Théodore Pescatore
Mersch	Michel Clément
Mersch	Emmanuel Servais
Redange	Rausch
Redange	Hippert
Redange	Eyschen
Remich	Augustin
Remich	Mathias Wellenstein
Remich	Jean-Pierre Ledure
Clervaux	Lucien Richard
Clervaux	Bernard Pondrom
