= George P. Raney =

American judge

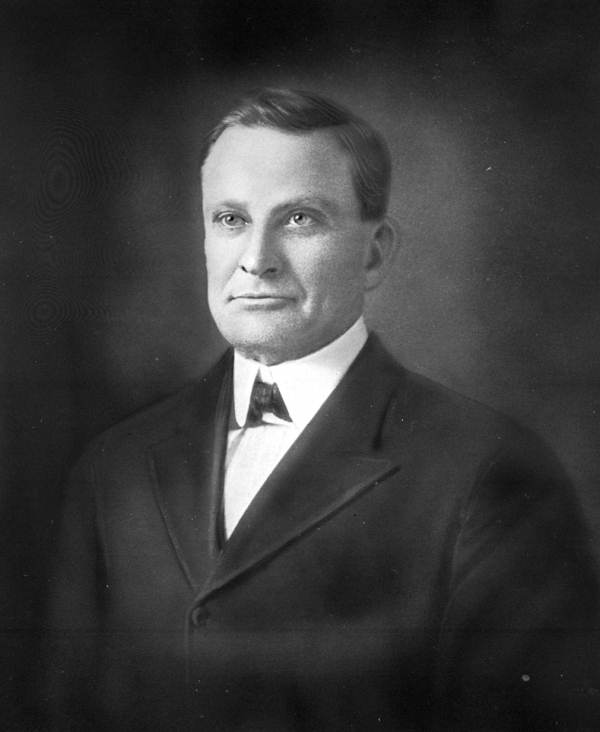

Member of the Florida Senate from the 8th district
- In office 1902–1904

Chief Justice of the Supreme Court of Florida
- In office January 1889 – June 30, 1894
- Preceded by: Augustus Maxwell
- Succeeded by: Benjamin S. Liddon

Justice of the Supreme Court of Florida
- In office January 13, 1885 – May 31, 1894
- Appointed by: Edward A. Perry
- Preceded by: James Westcott III
- Succeeded by: Benjamin S. Liddon

14th Florida Attorney General
- In office January 3, 1877 – January 13, 1885
- Governor: George Franklin Drew; William D. Bloxham
- Preceded by: William A. Cocke
- Succeeded by: Charles Merian Cooper

Personal details
- Born: October 11, 1845 Apalachicola, Florida, US
- Died: January 8, 1911 (aged 65) Tallahassee, Florida, US
- Party: Democratic
- Spouses: Mary Elizabeth Lamar (m. 1873; died 1899) Evelyn Cameron (m. 1901; died 1902)
- Children: 2
- Education: University of Virginia
- Occupation: Attorney

Military service
- Allegiance: Confederate States
- Branch/service: Confederate States Army
- Years of service: 1863–1865
- Rank: Sergeant Major
- Unit: 29th Georgia Cavalry Regiment
- Battles/wars: American Civil War

George Pettus Raney (October 11, 1845 – January 8, 1911) was an American attorney and politician who served as the 9th Chief Justice of the Florida Supreme Court.

== Early life and education ==
Raney was born on October 11, 1845, in Apalachicola, Florida. His father, David G. Raney, moved to Tallahassee, Florida in 1826 from Virginia.

Raney began studying at the University of Virginia in 1863, but left in order to serve in the Confederate States Army during the American Civil War. Raney served in the 29th Georgia Cavalry, beginning as a private and working his way to the rank of sergeant major. Raney served until the end of the war, with his unit surrendering alongside General Joseph E. Johnston and the Army of Tennessee at Bennett Place, near Durham, North Carolina. Raney was paroled in 1865 at Waynesboro, Georgia.

In 1866, Raney returned to the University of Virginia, graduating the next year with a law degree. He returned to Apalachicola in 1867 and was admitted into the Florida Bar.

== Political career ==
In 1868, Raney was elected to the Florida House of Representatives, representing Franklin County. As one of the few Democrats in the state house at the time, Raney, noted for his ability and outspokenness, became one of the de facto Democratic leaders in the Florida Legislature, leading efforts to impeach Republican governor Harrison Reed. Raney did not run for reelection in 1870. He moved to Tallahassee in the same year. In 1873, Raney began a law firm with former Florida Attorney General Mariano D. Papy.

=== 1876 election ===
In the controversy following the contentious 1876 elections, it was unknown who had won the presidential and gubernatorial elections in the state of Florida. For the presidential election, both of the candidates, Democratic New York Governor Samuel J. Tilden and Republican Ohio Governor Rutherford B. Hayes, were declaring victory in the state. In addition, both candidates for governor, incumbent Republican Marcellus Stearns and Democrat businessman George Franklin Drew, also declared victory. Raney was appointed as Drew's counsel to the Florida Supreme Court.

Stearns created a three-member body, the Florida Board of State Canvassers, to investigate the election. The board, which was mostly Republican, however, began throwing away Democratic votes and declared victory for both Hayes and Stearns in the state. Seeing as the Florida Legislature was deadlocked, Drew and Raney petitioned the Florida Supreme Court to decide on the matter. The court came to a compromise, with Hayes winning the state's electoral votes and Drew winning the governorship.

=== Florida Attorney General and Florida Supreme Court justice ===
In part due to his support during the election, Drew appointed Raney as the 14th Florida Attorney General on January 3, 1877. He also became the counsel for the Florida Internal Improvement Fund. Raney maintained his position as Florida Attorney General following the election of Governor William D. Bloxham in 1880. As a result of Governor John Milton bankrupting the state during the Civil War, there were many pending lawsuits between the railroad and canal companies and the state concerning land grants that could not be resolved. In 1881, Raney negotiated the sale of 4,000,000 acres (16,000 km^{2}) of public land to real estate magnate Hamilton Disston to relieve the debt.

On January 13, 1885, following the completion of Raney's second term as Florida Attorney General, Governor Edward A. Perry appointed him to the Florida Supreme Court, following the resignation of James Westcott, III. In 1888, as a result of the Constitution of 1885, which required justices to be elected by popular vote, Raney was reelected to the court. In January 1889, he became the chief justice of the Florida Supreme Court.

During his tenure as Chief Justice, the Florida Supreme Court oversaw some of the most important cases regarding expanding infrastructure and industrialization in the mostly rural state. Most notably was the case Pensacola and Atlantic Railroad Company v. Florida, in which the court decided in favor of the railroad, ruling that the state placing railroad tariffs is an abuse of discretion and constitutes the taking of the railroad company's property without due process of law. This case set a national precedent, as was reaffirmed by the U.S. Supreme Court in their decisions in Wilcox v. Consolidated Gas Company of New York and Knoxville v. Knoxville Water Company, both decided early in 1909 in favor of the companies. Raney retired from the court on June 30, 1894.

=== Later career ===
After returning to private practice, Raney was elected to the Florida House of Representatives, representing Leon County for one term. In 1902, he was elected to the Florida Senate from Leon County. While in the Senate, he also served as the counsel of the Seaboard Air Line Railroad, negotiating agreements between the railroad and the state government to improve passenger service in the Tallahassee area. Raney did not run for reelection in 1906, opting to return to private practice. While in private practice, Raney was regarded as a champion of the railroads.

== Personal life and death ==
In 1873, Raney married Mary Elizabeth Lamar, the cousin of U.S. Representative and later Florida Supreme Court justice Lucius Quintus Cincinnatus Lamar, II. They had two children, and were married until her death in 1899. In 1901, he married Evelyn Bird Cameron, the sister of Virginia governor William E. Cameron. His health deteriorated after her death in a fire the following year.

Raney died of pneumonia on January 8, 1911. His home in Franklin County, the David G. Raney House, is a Registered Historic Place.

Legal offices
Preceded by William A. Cocke	Attorney General of Florida; 1877-1885	Succeeded by Charles Merian Cooper
