= William H. Brockenbrough =

American politician

William Henry Brockenbrough

Member of the U.S. House of Representatives from Florida's at-large district
- In office January 24, 1846 – March 3, 1847
- Preceded by: Edward Carrington Cabell
- Succeeded by: Edward Carrington Cabell

Member of the Florida Senate
- In office 1840–1844

Member of the Legislative Council of the Territory of Florida from Mosquito County
- In office 1837–1842
- Preceded by: Charles Downing
- Succeeded by: William H. Williams

Personal details
- Born: February 23, 1812 Virginia
- Died: January 28, 1850 (aged 37) Tallahassee, Florida
- Resting place: Episcopal Cemetery
- Party: Whig, Democratic

William Henry Brockenbrough (February 23, 1812 – January 28, 1850) was a U.S. representative from Florida from 1846 to 1847, and a United States district attorney from 1841 to 1843. He served in the Legislative Council of the Territory of Florida representing Mosquito County in 1838, 1841, and in 1842 as its president.

Born in Virginia, Brockenbrough studied law, was admitted to the bar and settled in Tallahassee, Florida. In 1837 he became a member of the Legislative Council of the Territory of Florida sitting as president in 1842. He became a United States district attorney 1841–1843; upon the admission of Florida as a State into the Union successfully contested as a Democrat the election of Edward C. Cabell to the Twenty-ninth United States Congress and served from January 24, 1846, to March 3, 1847; died in Tallahassee, Florida, interred in Episcopal Cemetery.

U.S. House of Representatives
Preceded by Edward C. Cabell	Member of the U.S. House of Representatives from Florida's at-large congressional district 1846 – 1847	Succeeded by Edward C. Cabell
