= William Dunn Moseley =

1st Governor of Florida

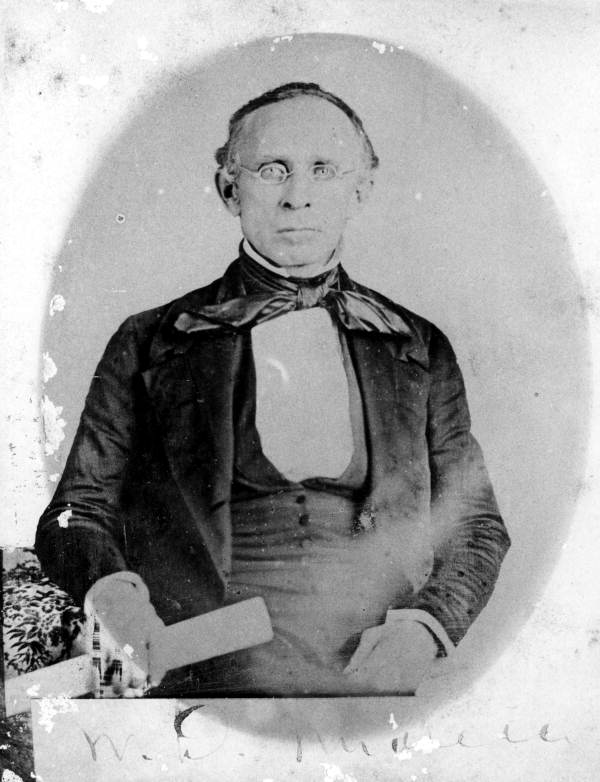

1st Governor of Florida
- In office June 25, 1845 – October 1, 1849
- Preceded by: John Branch (as the Governor of Florida Territory)
- Succeeded by: Thomas Brown

Member of the North Carolina Senate
- In office 1829-1837

Personal details
- Born: February 1, 1795 Lenoir County, North Carolina
- Died: January 4, 1863 (aged 67) Palatka, Florida
- Party: Democratic
- Spouse(s): Susan Hill Moseley (Widowed by time in office)
- Children: 6

William Dunn Moseley (February 1, 1795 – January 4, 1863) was an American politician. Born in North Carolina, Moseley became a Democratic politician and served in the state senate.

Later he moved to Florida, which became a state in 1845. That year he was elected as the first Governor of Florida, serving from 1845 until 1849.

== Early life and education ==
William Dunn Moseley was born on February 1, 1795, at Moseley Hall in Lenoir County, North Carolina.

William was the son of Matthew and Elizabeth Herring Moseley, who built Moseley Hall. He and his father were distant descendants of William Moseley, the immigrant ancestor, a merchant who was a member of the Company of Merchant Adventurers of London, a trading guild. He had been trading in Rotterdam before he came to Virginia in 1649. He settled-in, in what was then Lower Norfolk County, and built 'Greenwich' near Norfolk on the Elizabeth River. That plantation house was later known as Rolleston Hall; it was the last residence of Virginia Governor Henry A. Wise at the time of the Civil War.

Moseley graduated from the University of North Carolina at Chapel Hill in 1818. He was of English ancestry on both sides, descended from ancestors in the original thirteen colonies. He received his master's degree from UNC in 1821. While at the university, Moseley was the roommate of James K. Polk, a future president of the US.

== Marriage and family ==
In 1822, Moseley married Susan Hill; the couple had six children. Susan Hill Moseley died in March 1842, after the Moseleys moved to Florida.

== Career ==
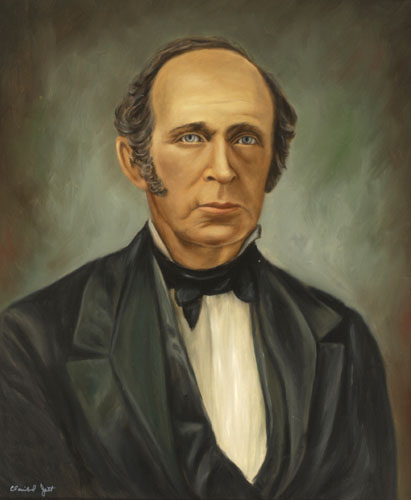
Portrait of Moseley

Flag used during Moseley's inauguration in 1845

In 1817, Moseley became a tutor at the university. After studying law, he was admitted to the bar and began practice in Wilmington. Like many lawyers of the time, law was not his only profession; Moseley also farmed and taught school.

From 1829 to 1837, Moseley represented Lenoir County in the North Carolina Senate, serving as speaker for four terms between 1832 and 1835. He lost the Democratic nomination for governor in North Carolina by three votes.

In 1835, Moseley and his family moved to Lake Miccosukee in Jefferson County, Florida, after purchasing a plantation there. In 1840, Moseley was elected to the territorial House of Representatives. In 1844, he won a seat in the territorial Senate. On March 3, 1845, Florida was admitted as the twenty-seventh state of the Union.

Later in 1845, in the first statewide election, Moseley won the election for Governor of Florida. He beat Richard Keith Call, who had been the governor of Florida Territory, and Moseley became the first governor of the state of Florida. Moseley was sworn in on June 25, 1845.

During his term, he established the new state government. The state Capitol building was completed during his first year in office. Moseley oversaw the state's role in the Mexican–American War. Like other Southern states, Florida supported the war with troops. The planter class believed the war was an opportunity to gain territory where slavery could be extended.

Moseley worked to resolve conflicts between white settlers and the Seminole who remained in Florida, chiefly in the southern Everglades area. (Many Seminole had been removed to Indian Territory west of the Mississippi River after warfare with US forces.)

He encouraged development of agriculture, supporting new citrus, avocado, tobacco, and cotton industries. During his administration, the federal government built Fort Jefferson, on one of the coral keys off the southern Florida coast, and Fort Clinch on Amelia Island, near modern-day Fernandina Beach, Florida. These were defenses against European nations that still had colonies in the Caribbean and the Americas.

Moseley was a strong supporter of states' rights. Unusually for his time, he favored the establishment of state-funded public schools.

Constitutionally limited to a single term, Moseley returned to his plantation after ending his term on October 1, 1849. Two years later, he settled in the town of Palatka in Putnam County. There he operated a citrus grove. Moseley died on January 4, 1863, and was buried at the West View Cemetery in Palatka.

After his death, his daughters commissioned a portrait to be painted from a daguerreotype. They presented the portrait for display in a state portrait gallery at the Florida capitol.

Party political offices
First	Democratic nominee for Governor of Florida; 1845	Succeeded by William Bailey
Political offices
Preceded by John Branch; Territorial Governor	Governor of Florida; June 25, 1845 – October 1, 1849	Succeeded by Thomas Brown
