= Edward C. Cabell =

American politician (1816–1896)

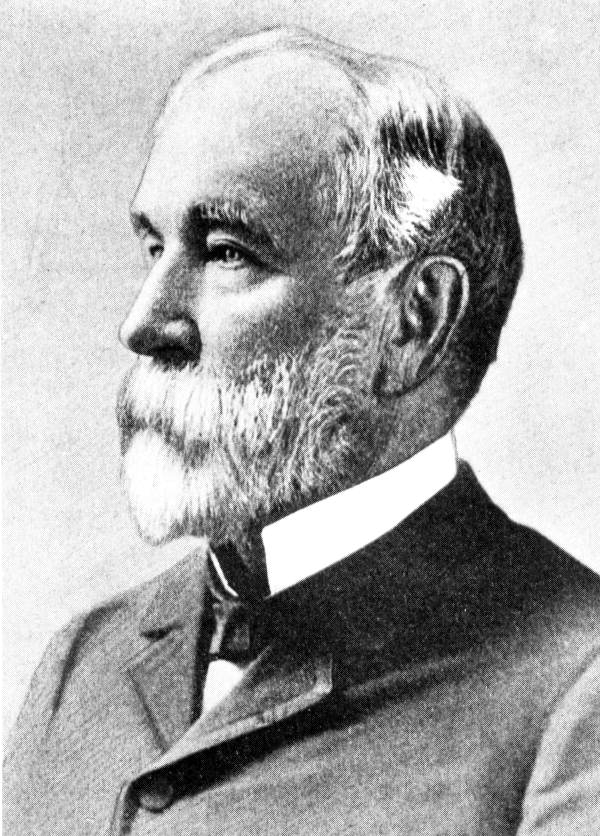

Member of the U.S. House of Representatives from Florida's at-large district
- In office October 6, 1845 – January 24, 1846
- Preceded by: David Levy Yulee (Delegate, Member-elect)
- Succeeded by: William H. Brockenbrough
- In office March 4, 1847 – March 3, 1853
- Preceded by: William H. Brockenbrough
- Succeeded by: Augustus Maxwell

Personal details
- Born: February 5, 1816 Richmond, Virginia, US
- Died: February 28, 1896 (aged 80) St Louis, Missouri, US
- Party: Whig
- Spouse: Anna Marie Wilcox
- Education: University of Virginia
- Profession: Lawyer

Military service
- Allegiance: Confederate States
- Branch/service: Confederate States Army
- Years of service: 1862-1865
- Rank: Lieutenant Colonel
- Unit: Major General Sterling Price's Staff
- Battles/wars: American Civil War

Edward Carrington Cabell (February 5, 1816 – February 28, 1896) was the first U.S. Representative from Florida.

== Biography ==
Born in Richmond, Virginia; attended Washington College (now Washington and Lee University), Lexington, Virginia in 1832 and 1833 and Reynolds' Classical Academy in 1833 and 1834; was graduated from the University of Virginia at Charlottesville, Virginia in 1836; moved to Florida in 1837 and engaged in agricultural pursuits near Tallahassee, Florida.

Cabell served as delegate to the Territorial convention to form a State constitution in 1838. He returned to Virginia where he studied law and was admitted to the bar in 1840. He then returned to Tallahassee, and upon the admission of Florida as a State into the Union he was seemingly elected to the Twenty-ninth United States Congress and seated after he presented credentials. However his opponent, William H. Brockenbrough, contested the election on the grounds that if some returns, that were delivered after the 30 day time limit, were included he would've won and arguing that some ballots should be excluded because of how they were delivered. The investigating committee did not agree that who delivered the ballots should matter, but did decide that the time limit was merely directory and that all the returns should be included. This resulted in a small victory for Brockenbrough and so Cabell was deemed ineligible and the seat awarded to Brokenbrough. Cabell thus served from October 6, 1845, to January 24, 1846. Cabell ran again and was elected as a Whig to the Thirtieth and then re-elected to the Thirty-first and Thirty-second Congresses (March 4, 1847 – March 3, 1853), but was an unsuccessful candidate in 1852 for reelection to the Thirty-third Congress. During his time in Congress he served as chairman of the Committee on Expenditures on Public Buildings during the Thirtieth-Congress.

Resumed the practice of law in Tallahassee; moved to St. Louis, Missouri in 1859, In May–June 1861 served as Missouri Governor C. F. Jackson's secret Commissioner (Ambassador) to the Confederate Government. Subsequently, during the American Civil War served in the Confederate Army with rank of lieutenant colonel; engaged in the practice of law in New York City 1868–1872, and subsequently in St. Louis, Mo.; member of the State senate of Missouri 1878–1882; died in St. Louis, Mo.; interment in Bellefontaine Cemetery.

== Sources ==
- United States Congress. "Edward C. Cabell (id: C000003)". Biographical Directory of the United States Congress.

U.S. House of Representatives
Preceded by David Levy Yulee as Delegate and Member-elect	Member of the U.S. House of Representatives from Florida's at-large congressional district October 6, 1845 – January 24, 1846	Succeeded by William H. Brockenbrough
Preceded by William H. Brockenbrough	Member of the U.S. House of Representatives from Florida's at-large congressional district March 4, 1847 – March 3, 1853	Succeeded by Augustus Maxwell
