= George Hollahan Jr. =

American politician (1919–1982)

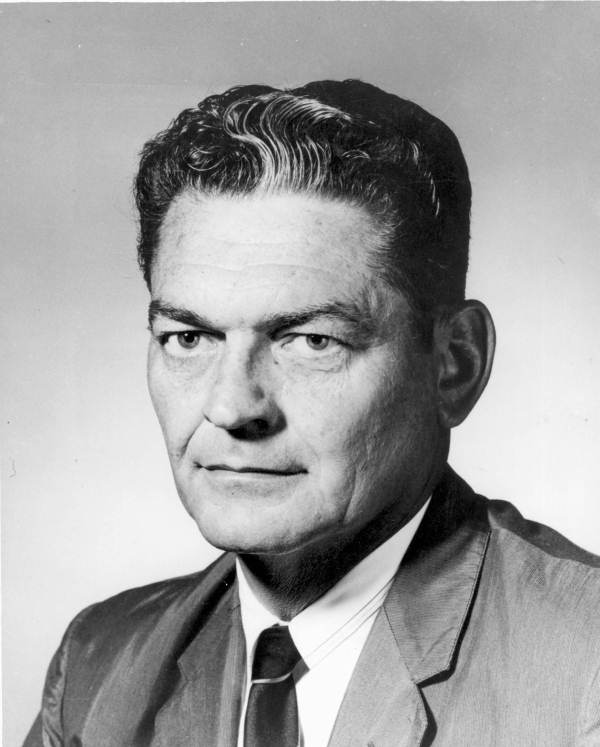
- Hollahan in 1969

Member of the Florida House of Representatives from Dade County
- In office 1957–1963

Member of the Florida Senate from the 43rd district
- In office 1963–1965
- Preceded by: District established
- Succeeded by: Robert Shevin

Member of the Florida Senate from the 44th district
- In office 1966–1972
- Preceded by: District established
- Succeeded by: District eliminated

Personal details
- Born: May 1, 1919 Pittsburgh, Pennsylvania, U.S.
- Died: August 1982 (aged 63)
- Party: Democratic
- Spouse: Anne Hollahan
- Children: 4
- Education: University of Miami

George L. Hollahan Jr. (May 1, 1919 – August 1982) was an American politician. He served as a Democratic member of the Florida House of Representatives. He also served as a member for the 43rd and 44th district of the Florida Senate.

== Life and career ==
Hollahan was born in Pittsburgh, Pennsylvania. He attended Riverside Military Academy and the University of Miami. He served in the United States Navy during World War II.

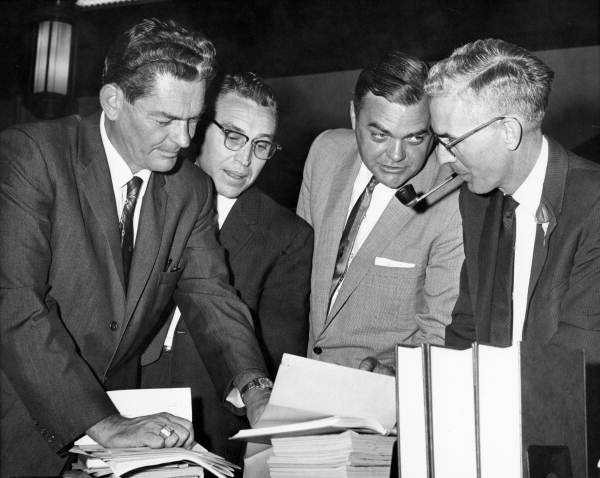
Hollahan (left) with Osee Fagan, John J. Crews Jr. and William G. O'Neill, 1962

In 1957, Hollahan was elected to the Florida House of Representatives, serving until 1963. In the same year, he was elected to represent the 43rd district of the Florida Senate. He served until 1965, when he was succeeded by Robert Shevin. In 1966, he was elected to represent the 44th district, serving until 1972.

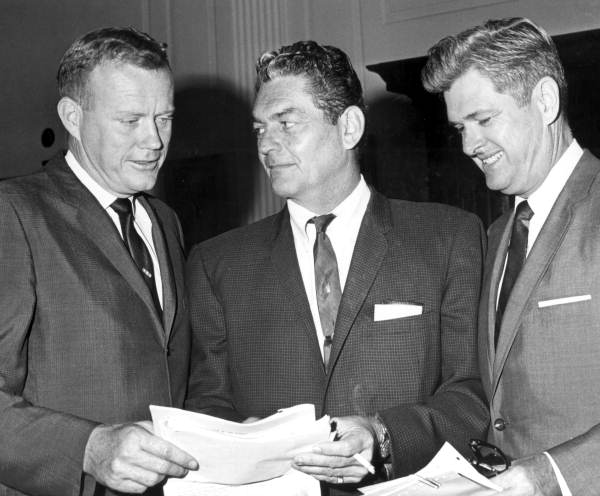
Hollahan (center) with A. J. Ryan and Robert M. Haverfield, 1965

Hollahan died in August 1982, at the age of 63.
