= John J. Crews Jr. =

American politician (1921–1987)

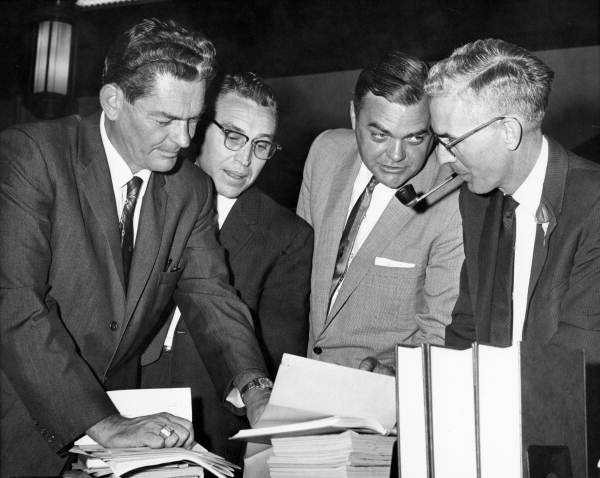
- Crews with George Hollahan Jr., Osee Fagan and William G. O'Neill, 1962

Member of the Florida House of Representatives
- In office 1953–1966

Personal details
- Born: October 18, 1921
- Died: November 20, 1987 (aged 66)
- Party: Democratic
- Children: 1

John J. Crews Jr. (October 18, 1921 – November 20, 1987) was a lawyer and state legislator in Florida. He served in the Florida House of Representatives from 1953 to 1966 representing, Baker County, Florida. He was a Democrat. He had two heart attacks while in office.
