= Leonard Dennis =

Leonard Dennis may refer to:

- Leonard G. Dennis (died 1885), political figure
- Lennie Dennis (born 1964), Jamaican footballer
