= Florida's 13th Senate district =

American legislative district

Florida's 13th State Senate district
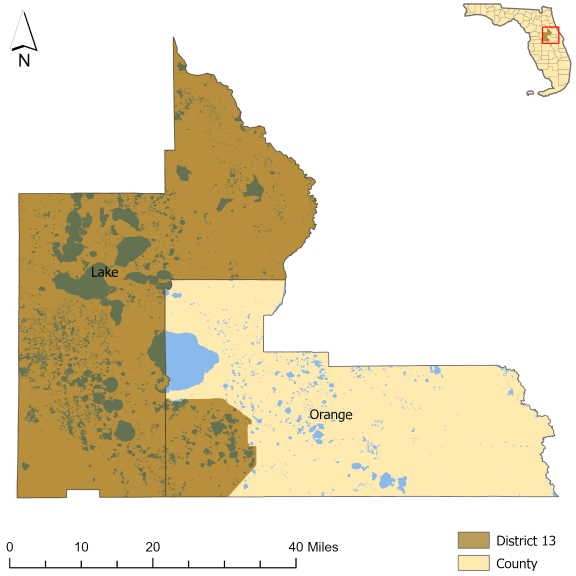
Senator
Keith Truenow; R–Tavares
- Demographics: 63% White; 9% Black; 18% Hispanic; 4% Asian; 1% Other; 5% Multiracial
- Population (2023): 550,630

Florida's 13th Senate district elects one member of the Florida Senate. The district consists of all of Lake County and part of southwestern Orange County, in the U.S. state of Florida. The current senator is Republican Keith Truenow.

From 1869 to 1871 and again from 1877 to 1881, the district was represented by Josiah T. Walls, one of the first African Americans in the United States Congress. From 1968 to 1972, the district was represented by Jim Williams, the future Lieutenant Governor of Florida and United States Deputy Secretary of Agriculture.

The district contains popular Orlando attractions like Universal Studios Florida and most of Walt Disney World.

== List of senators ==
Full list of senators from the 13th district (1845–2006).

Portrait	Name	Party	Years of service	Home city/state	Notes
	Josiah T. Walls	Republican	1869–1871	Winchester, Virginia	Consisted of Alachua County
	Leonard G. Dennis	Republican	1871–1877	Massachusetts	Consisted of Alachua County
	Josiah T. Walls	Republican	1877–1881	Winchester, Virginia	Consisted of Alachua County
	Gardner S. Hardee	Democratic	1888–1892	Brooks County, Georgia	Consisted of Brevard County
	Elisha Newton Dimick	Democratic	1896–1904	Constantine, Michigan	Consisted of Palm Beach County
	Ernest R. Graham	Democratic	1936–1942	Croswell, Michigan	Consisted of Dade County
	R. B. Gautier Jr.	Democratic	1948–1956	Miami, Florida	Consisted of Dade County
	Joe Oscar Eaton	Democratic	1956–1959	Monticello, Florida	Consisted of Dade County
	W. C. "Cliff" Herrell	Democratic	1960–1964		Consisted of Dade County
	Robert M. Haverfield	Democratic	1964–1966	Cadiz, Ohio	
	L. K. Edwards Jr.	Democratic	1966–1968	Irvine, Florida	Consisted of Marion County
	Jim Williams	Democratic	1968–1972	Ocala, Florida	Consisted of Marion County
	Alan Trask	Democratic	1972–1982	Bartow, Florida	Consisted of Polk County
	Bob Crawford	Democratic	1982–1990	Bartow, Florida	Consisted of Polk County
	Rick Dantzler	Democratic	1990–1992	Fort Leonard Wood, Missouri	Consisted of Polk County
	John Grant Jr.	Democratic	1992–2000		
	Victor Crist	Republican	2000–2002	New Orleans, Louisiana	Redistricted; Consisted of parts of Hillsborough and Pasco counties
	Dennis Jones	Republican	2002–2012	Erie, Pennsylvania	Redistricted; Consisted of most of Pinellas County
	Andy Gardiner	Republican	2012–2016	Orlando, Florida	Redistricted from the 9th district; Consisted of eastern Orange County and the northern part of Brevard County
	Linda Stewart	Democratic	2016–2022	Johnstown, Pennsylvania	Redistricted; Consisted of eastern Orange County
	Dennis Baxley	Republican	2022–2024	Ocala, Florida	Redistricted from the 12th district; Consisted of all of Lake County and part of southwestern Orange County
	Keith Truenow	Republican	2024–present	St. Cloud, Minnesota	Consists all of Lake County and part of southwestern Orange County

== Elections ==
=== 2020 ===
2020 Florida's 13th senate district election
Party	Candidate	Votes	%
Democratic	Linda Stewart	152,769	60.6%
Republican	Josh Anderson	99,134	39.4%
Total votes		251,903	100%
Democratic hold			

=== 2022 ===
2022 Florida's 13th senate district election
Party	Candidate	Votes	%
Republican	Dennis Baxley (incumbent)	133,755	62.15
Democratic	Stephanie Dukes	81,472	37.85
Total votes		215,227	100%
Republican hold			

=== 2024 ===
2024 Florida's 13th senate district election
Party	Candidate	Votes	%
Republican	Keith Truenow	181,074	60.30
Democratic	Stephanie Dukes	119,212	39.70
Total votes		300,286	100.00
Republican hold			
