= Ernest Graham =

Ernest Graham may refer to:

- Ernest R. Graham (architect) (1866–1936), American architect
- Ernest R. Graham (politician) (1886–1957), American politician
- Ernie Graham (1946–2001), singer-songwriter

== See also ==
- Earnest Graham (born 1980), NFL running back
- Ernest Graham-Little (1867–1950), dermatologist and British Member of Parliament
