= Robert M. Haverfield =

American judge and politician

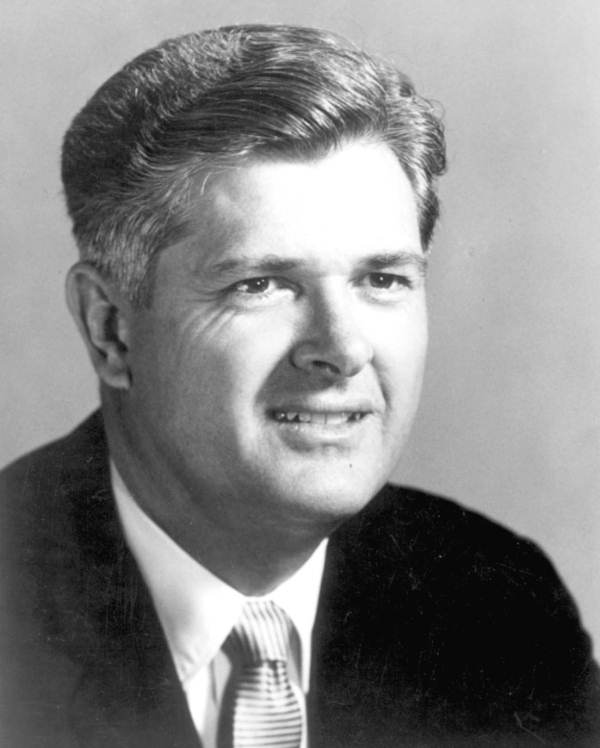
- Haversfield in 1965

Member of the Florida Senate from the 13th district
- In office 1965–1966

Member of the Florida Senate from the 41st district
- In office 1967–1972

Judge of the Florida Third District Court of Appeal
- In office 1972–1980

Personal details
- Born: October 26, 1918 Cadiz, Ohio, U.S.
- Died: September 8, 1980 (aged 61) Coral Gables, Florida, U.S.
- Party: Democratic
- Spouse: Shirley O’Conner (m. 1948)
- Education: Ohio State University; University of Miami
- Occupation: Judge

Robert M. Haverfield (October 26, 1918 – September 8, 1980) was an American judge and politician. He served as a Democratic member for the 13th and 41st district of the Florida Senate.

== Life and career ==
Haverfield was born in Cadiz, Ohio. He attended Ohio State University and the University of Miami.

In 1965, Haverfield was elected to represent the 13th district of the Florida Senate, serving until 1966. In 1967, he was elected to represent the 41st district, serving until 1972. In the same year, he was appointed by Governor Reubin Askew to serve as a judge for the Florida Third District Court of Appeal, serving until his death.

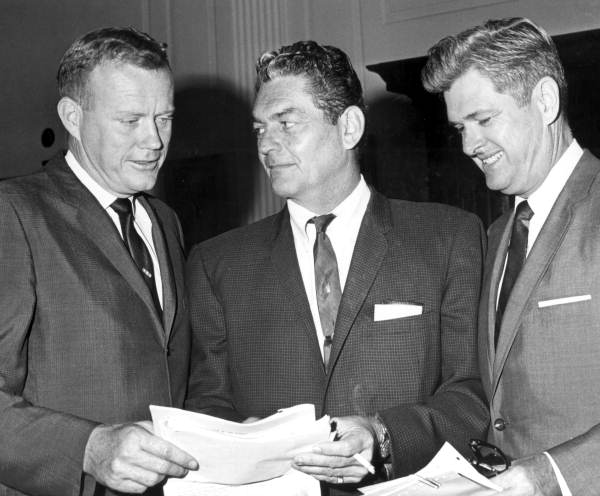
Haverfield (right) with George Hollahan Jr. and A. J. Ryan, 1965

Haverfield died in September 1980 at his home in Coral Gables, Florida, at the age of 61.
