= Senator Niblack =

Senator Niblack may refer to:

- Silas L. Niblack (1825–1883), Florida State Senate
- William E. Niblack (1822–1893), Indiana State Senate
