= Hollahan =

Hollahan is a surname. Notable people with the surname include:

- Bill Hollahan (1896–1965), American baseball player
- George Hollahan Jr. (1919–1982), American politician
