= BankUnited =

Florida based regional bank

BankUnited, Inc.
- Type: Public
- Traded as: NYSE: BKU; Russell 1000 Index component S&P 600 component
- Industry: Financial services
- Predecessor: BankUnited Financial Corporation
- Founded: 1984; 42 years ago
- Headquarters: Miami Lakes, Florida, U.S., United States
- Area served: Florida, Tri-state market of New York, New Jersey, Connecticut, Atlanta, Charlotte
- Key people: Rajinder P. Singh (Chairman, President & CEO) Thomas M. Cornish (Chief Operating Officer) James G. Mackey (Chief Financial Officer)
- Products: Consumer Banking, Corporate Banking
- Total assets: ▲US$ 34.6 billion (September 30, 2026)
- Website: www.bankunited.com

BankUnited, Inc. is the bank holding company of BankUnited, N.A., a national bank founded in 1984 and headquartered in Miami Lakes, Florida. The company operates in Florida; the regions in and around Atlanta, Georgia; Dallas, Texas; Morristown, New Jersey; Charlotte, North Carolina; and in the New York metropolitan area. BankUnited also offers certain commercial lending and deposit products through national platforms and has total assets of $34.6 billion as of September 30, 2026.

BankUnited, Inc. was organized by a management team led by John A. Kanas and was initially capitalized with $945.0 million by a group of investors including W.L. Ross, Blackstone Group, The Carlyle Group, and Centerbridge Partners. On May 21, 2009, BankUnited acquired substantially all of the assets and assumed all of the non-brokered deposits and substantially all other liabilities of BankUnited, FSB, from the FDIC in the FSB Acquisition. On February 2, 2011, the Company completed its IPO.

The bank offers a broad range of online services, treasury management tools for businesses and traditional depository and lending products.
