= Miami Lakes, Florida =

Town in the state of Florida, United States

- Town
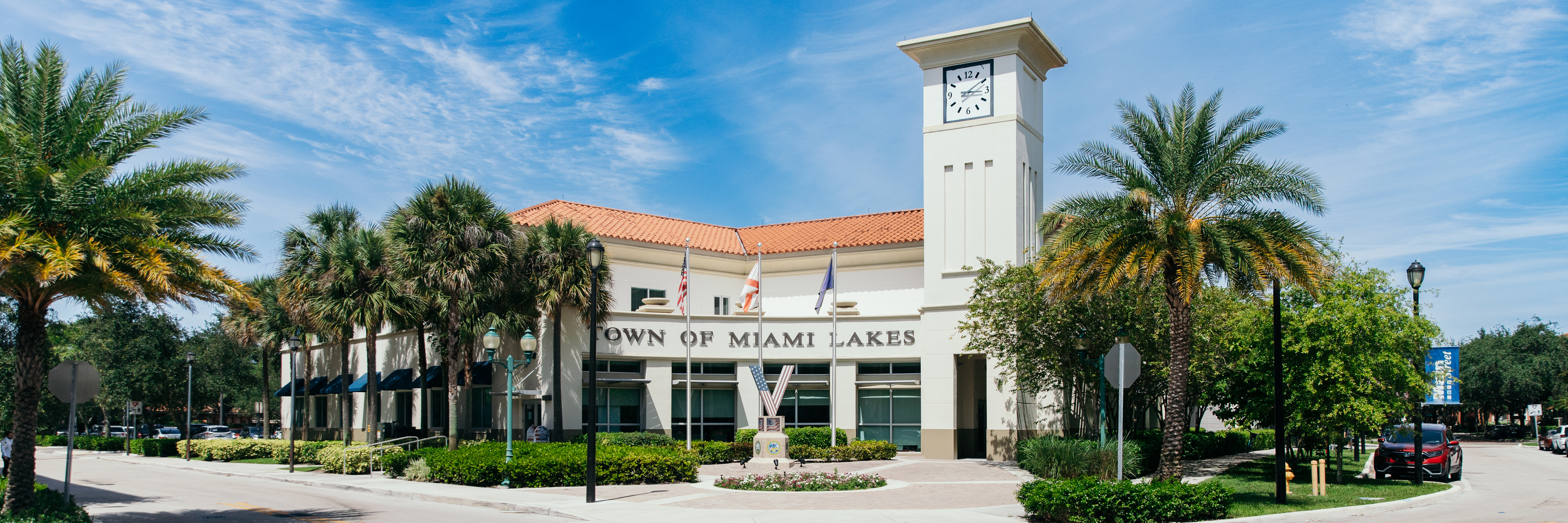
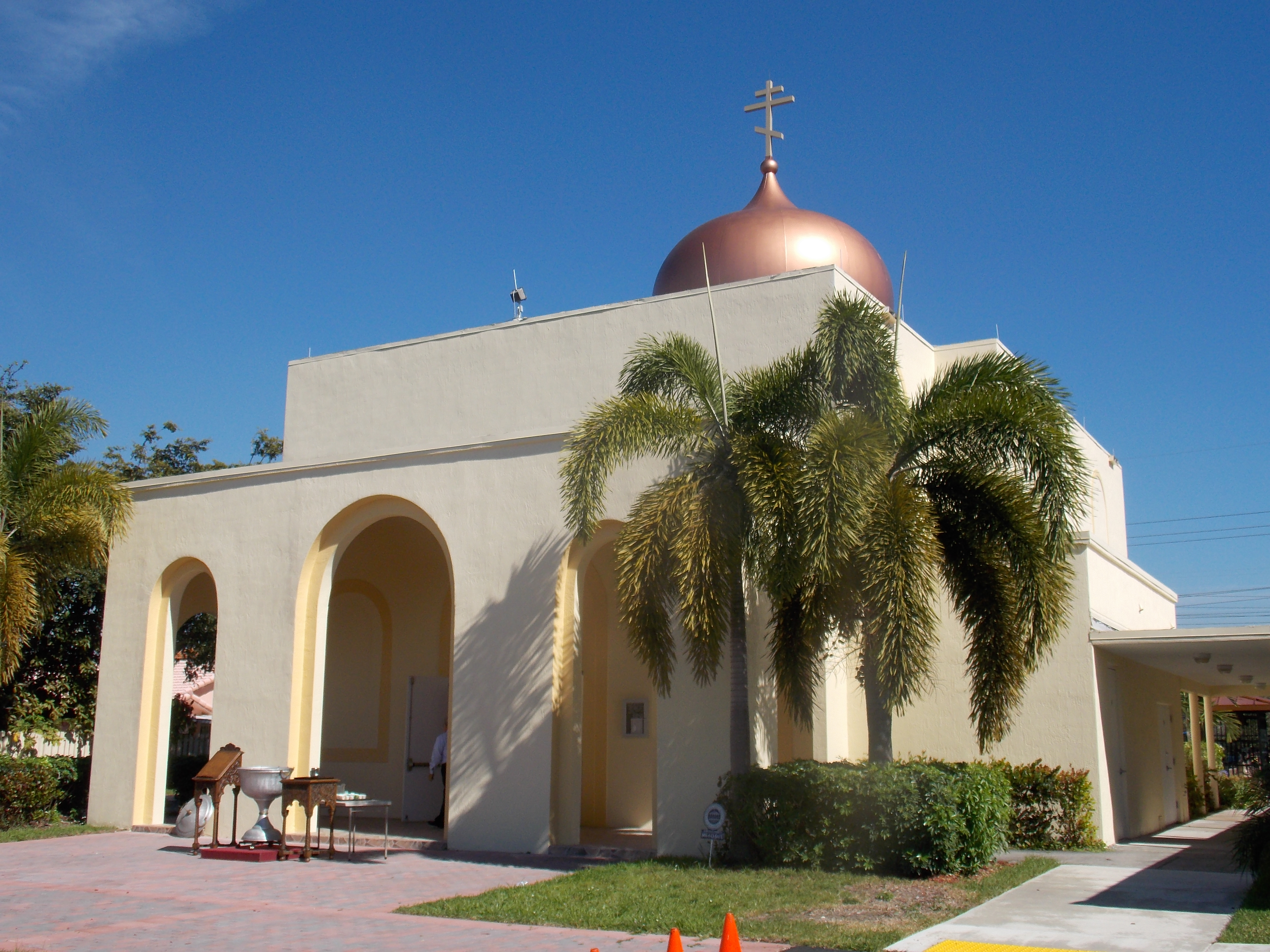
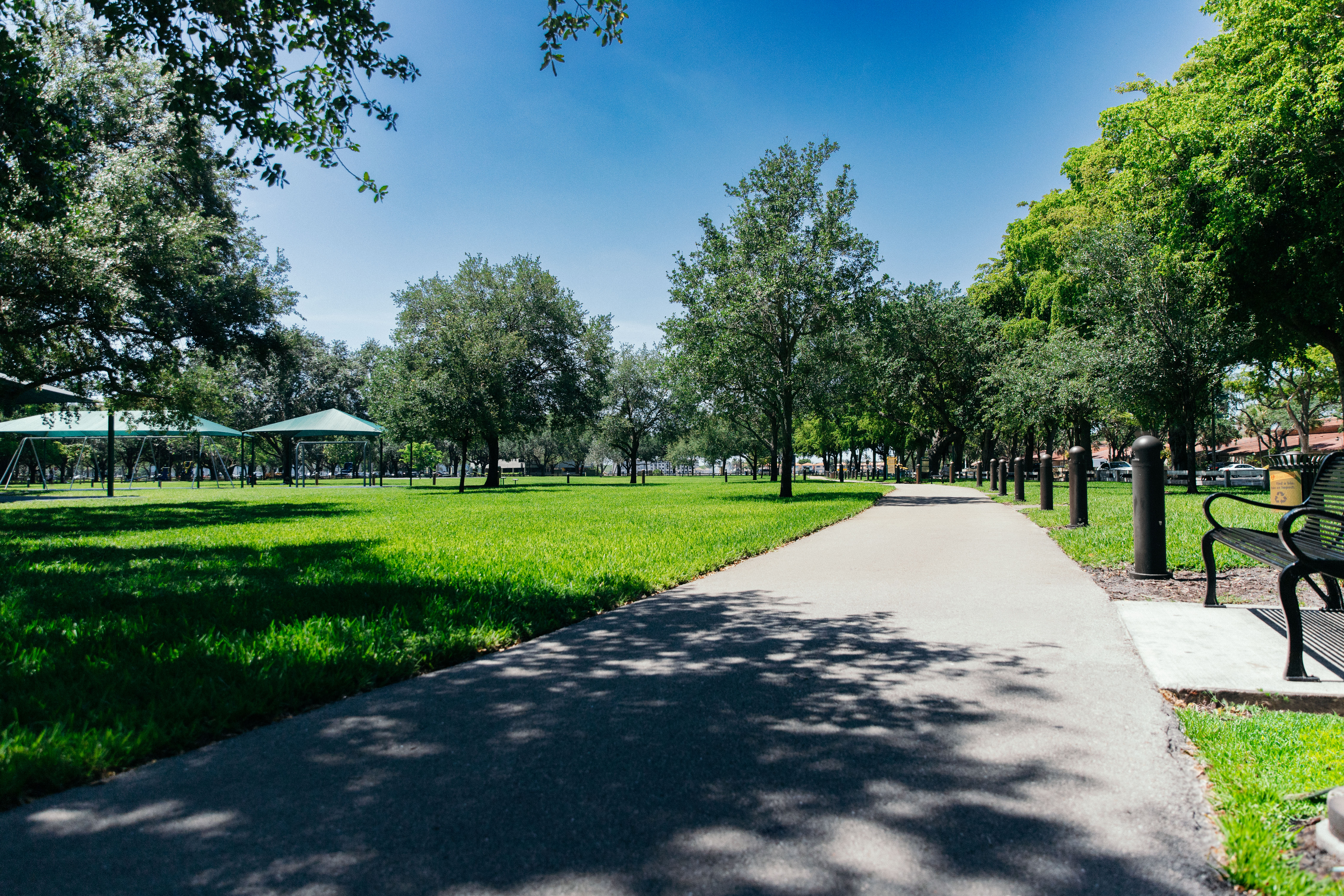
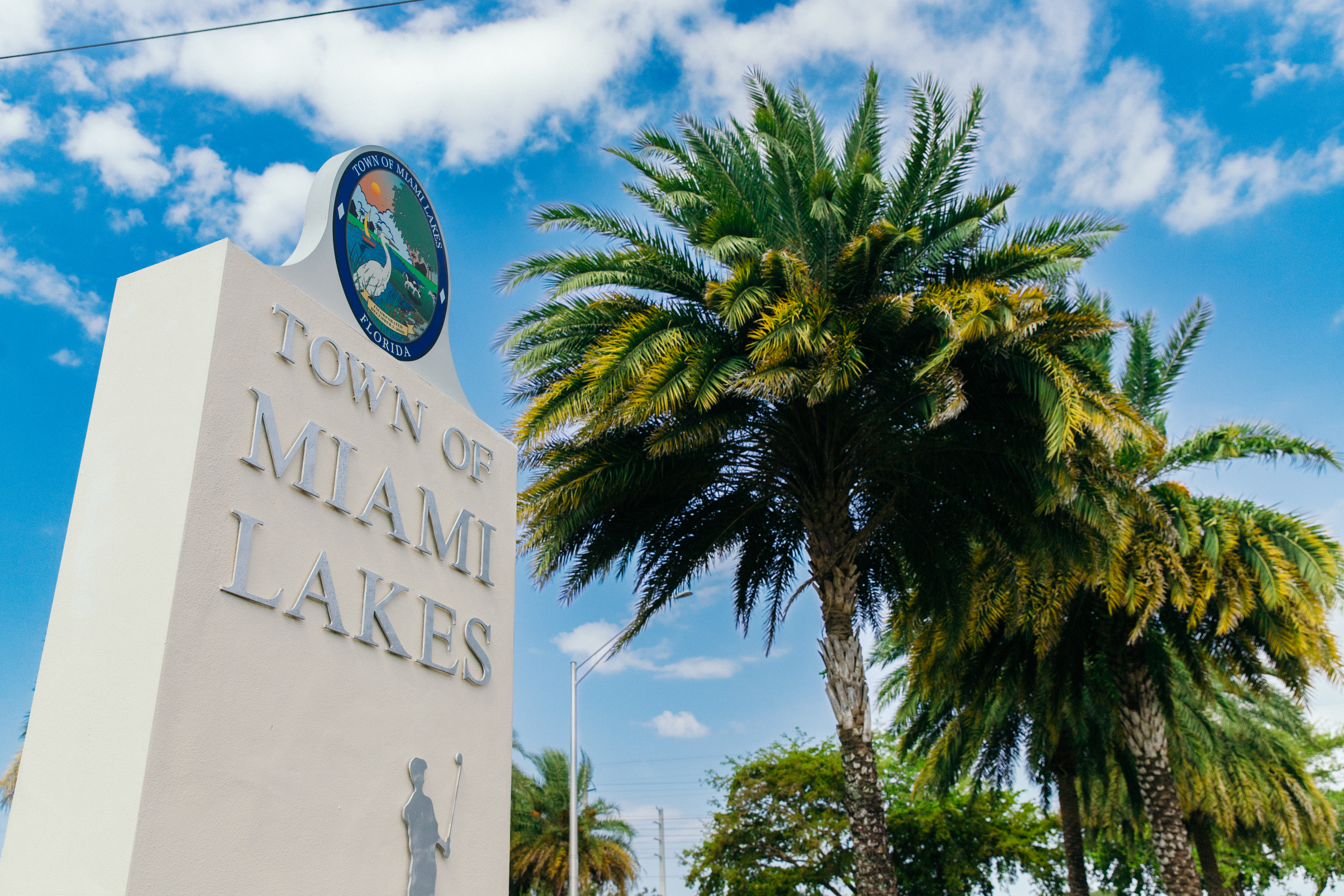
- Town Hall of Miami Lakes Christ the Savior Orthodox Cathedral Veterans Park Miami Lakes Drive

- Flag Seal
- Motto: "Growing Beautifully"
- Location in Miami-Dade County and the state of Florida

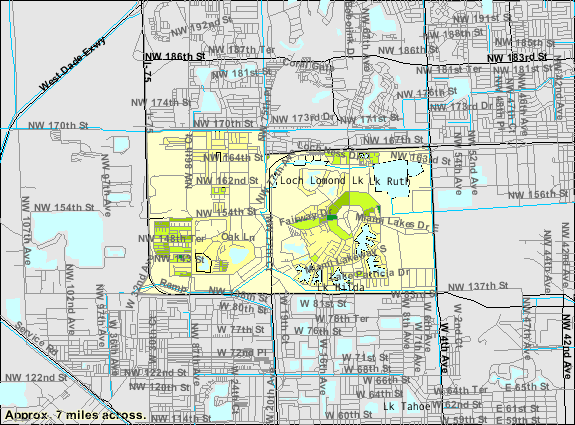
- U.S. Census Bureau map showing town boundaries
- Coordinates: 25°54′45″N 80°19′17″W
- Country: United States
- State: Florida
- County: Miami-Dade
- Incorporated: December 6, 2000

Government
  - Type: Council-Manager

Area
  - Total: 6.51 sq mi (16.85 km^{2})
  - Land: 5.66 sq mi (14.65 km^{2})
  - Water: 0.85 sq mi (2.20 km^{2}) 6.73%
- Elevation: 7 ft (2.1 m)

Population (2020)
  - Total: 30,467
  - Density: 5,385.7/sq mi (2,079.43/km^{2})
- Time zone: UTC-5 (Eastern (EST))
  - Summer (DST): UTC-4 (EDT)
- ZIP Codes: 33014, 33016, 33018
- Area codes: 305, 786, 645
- FIPS code: 12-45100
- GNIS feature ID: 2406152
- Website: miamilakes-fl.gov

Miami Lakes, officially the Town of Miami Lakes, is an incorporated town in Miami-Dade County, Florida, United States. The town is part of the Miami metropolitan area of South Florida. As of the 2020 census, the population was 30,467.

== History ==
The development was constructed by Sengra (now the Graham Companies) beginning in 1962 on land formerly owned by Florida state senator Ernest "Cap" Graham. The Grahams stated for many years that it would be a 30-year development, but they are still developing to this day.

The original Miami Lakes development, east of the Palmetto Expressway, was master-planned by Lester Collins with curving tree-shaded roadways and numerous curving lakes, which are unusual compared to most surrounding areas with their treeless streets on a square grid and rectangular lakes. This original development, which is on the east side of the more recently designated Town of Miami Lakes, has neighborhood shopping centers, tot-lot parks, and a town center named Main Street. A significant portion of Miami Lakes is still owned by the Grahams, mostly apartment buildings, shopping centers, office buildings, and undeveloped land. The town is an early model of the New Urbanism movement, with shopping and services located within walking distance of residences as well as narrow, walkable streets and plenty of neighborhood parks.

When it was incorporated in December 2000, the Town of Miami Lakes became the 31st municipality in Miami-Dade County. Miami Lakes is home to more than 1,100 businesses.

The Master Plan began over 50 years ago when the Graham family began the development of what was their dairy farm. Unlike many cities and towns created during the early 1960s, the Grahams decided to create a master plan for the city that would allow decades of growth, construction, and changing market conditions. Lester Collins, former dean of the Harvard School of Design, was enlisted to create a master plan for the area that would become the center of Miami Lakes. Collins laid the foundation for an integrated community, including residential, commercial, industrial, and mixed uses.

Former U.S. Senator Bob Graham, the younger half-brother of family patriarch William "Bill" Graham, was one of the owners, and Katharine Graham, the late publisher of the Washington Post, had a share by marriage. On December 5, 2000, Miami Lakes voted to become an incorporated town.

== Geography ==
Miami Lakes is located 15 miles (24 km) northwest of downtown Miami. It is bordered to the south and west by the city of Hialeah, to the east by the city of Miami Gardens, and to the north by the unincorporated community of Country Club.

According to the United States Census Bureau, the town of Miami Lakes has a total area of 6.5 square miles (17 km^{2}). 5.7 square miles (15 km^{2}) of it are land and 0.8 square miles (2.1 km^{2}) of it (13.05%) are water.

=== Climate ===
Miami Lakes has a tropical climate, similar to the climate found in much of the Caribbean. It is part of the only region in the 48 contiguous states that falls under that category. More specifically, it generally has a tropical rainforest climate (Köppen climate classification: Af), bordering a tropical monsoon climate (Köppen climate classification: Am).

== Demographics ==
Historical population
Census	Pop.	Note	%±
1980	9,809		—
1990	12,750		30.0%
2000	22,676		77.9%
2010	29,361		29.5%
2020	30,467		3.8%
U.S. Decennial Census

=== Racial and ethnic composition ===
Miami Lakes, Florida – Racial and ethnic composition Note: the US Census treats Hispanic/Latino as an ethnic category. This table excludes Latinos from the racial categories and assigns them to a separate category. Hispanics/Latinos may be of any race.
Race / Ethnicity (NH = Non-Hispanic)	Pop 2000	Pop 2010	Pop 2020	% 2000	% 2010	% 2020
White alone (NH)	6,362	4,227	3,286	28.06%	14.40%	10.79%
Black or African American alone (NH)	530	718	647	2.34%	2.45%	2.12%
Native American or Alaska Native alone (NH)	20	4	4	0.09%	0.01%	0.01%
Asian alone (NH)	480	407	469	2.12%	1.39%	1.54%
Pacific Islander alone (NH)	6	2	3	0.03%	0.01%	0.01%
Other Race alone (NH)	20	31	129	0.09%	0.11%	0.42%
Mixed race or Multiracial (NH)	175	146	293	0.77%	0.50%	0.96%
Hispanic or Latino (any race)	15,083	23,826	25,636	66.52%	81.15%	84.14%
Total	22,676	29,361	30,467	100.00%	100.00%	100.00%

=== 2020 census ===
As of the 2020 census, Miami Lakes had a population of 30,467. The median age was 43.1 years. 18.2% of residents were under the age of 18 and 16.7% of residents were 65 years of age or older. For every 100 females there were 89.5 males, and for every 100 females age 18 and over there were 85.8 males age 18 and over.

100.0% of residents lived in urban areas, while 0.0% lived in rural areas.

There were 11,238 households in Miami Lakes, of which 32.2% had children under the age of 18 living in them. Of all households, 51.1% were married-couple households, 14.1% were households with a male householder and no spouse or partner present, and 26.4% were households with a female householder and no spouse or partner present. About 21.0% of all households were made up of individuals and 8.1% had someone living alone who was 65 years of age or older.

There were 12,090 housing units, of which 7.0% were vacant. The homeowner vacancy rate was 0.9% and the rental vacancy rate was 13.4%.

=== 2010 census ===
As of the 2010 United States census, there were 29,361 people, 9,533 households, and 7,050 families residing in the town.

=== 2000 census ===
In 2000, 37.7% had children under the age of 18 living with them, 58.6% were married couples living together, 12.0% had a female householder with no husband present, and 25.9% were non-families. 20.8% of all households were made up of individuals, and 4.8% had someone living alone who was 65 years of age or older. The average household size was 2.75 and the average family size was 3.21.

In 2000, 25.1% of the population was under the age of 18, 7.2% was from 18 to 24, 34.9% from 25 to 44, 22.7% from 45 to 64, and 10.1% was 65 years of age or older. The median age was 36 years. For every 100 females, there were 92.6 males. For every 100 females age 18 and over, there were 89.4 males.

As of 2000, 72.41% of the population spoke Spanish at home, while 24.65% spoke only English. In addition, 0.67% of residents spoke Portuguese and 0.64% spoke Urdu.

=== Income and poverty ===
As of 2009-2013, the median income for a household in the town was $63,754 and the median income for a family was $68,431. Males had a median income of $45,759 versus $31,656 for females. The per capita income for the town was $28,867. About 3.8% of families and 4.9% of the population were below the poverty line, including 4.1% of those under age 18 and 5.2% of those age 65 or over.

== Government ==
Since its incorporation in 2000, the Town of Miami Lakes operates under a council-manager form of government. The council-manager system combines the strong leadership of elected officials with the strong managerial experience of an appointed town manager.

The mayor's seat is elected at-large for a four-year term. As defined in the town's charter, the mayor shall preside at meetings of the council and be a voting member of the council. The town council is vested with all legislative powers of the town. The council consists of the mayor and six members.

As of 2024, the town council members are:

- Mayor – Josh Dieguez
- Councilmember Seat 1 - Angelo Cuadra Garcia
- Councilmember Seat 2 – Ray Garcia
- Councilmember Seat 3 – Juan Carlos Fernandez
- Councilmember Seat 4 – Alejandro Sanchez
- Councilmember Seat 5 – Steven Herzberg
- Councilmember Seat 6 – Bryan Morera

The Town of Miami Lakes held a grand opening and ribbon-cutting for its new town hall on April 23, 2013, located at the east end of Main Street.

On October 5, 2010, Nelson Hernandez became the youngest council member elected to the Miami Lakes Town Council at the age of 24, ever since the town's incorporation in 2000.

The Miami-Dade Sheriff’s Office is under contract with the Town of Miami Lakes to perform law enforcement functions within the Town.

The Miami-Dade Fire Rescue operates Station 1 Miami Lakes & Station 64 Miami Lakes West.

Mayors of Miami Lakes

Image	Mayor	Years	Notes
	Wayne Slaton	2000–2008	First mayor of Miami Lakes
	Michael Pizzi	2008–2013	Elected in 2008 and re-elected in 2012. Forced to resign in 2013 after being arrested for corruption
	Caesar Mestre	2013	Served as vice mayor and then interim mayor in 2013 after Pizzi was arrested for corruption
	Wayne Slaton	2013 (2nd term)	Elected in a special election
	Michael Pizzi	2013–2016	Reinstated as mayor after acquittal on charges of corruption
	Manny Cid	2016–Present	

== Economy ==
Several companies are headquartered in Miami Lakes, including BankUnited, N.A.; one of the largest banking institutions in the United States.

Potamkin Auto Group, The Graham Companies, Fine Art Lamps, Pacer, New Generation Computing, South Florida ENT Associates, Inktel, Isaco International, Safari, 1st Financial, American Bancshares Mortgage, LLC, National Molding, Lotspeich and Oliva Cigar.

== Education ==
=== Public schools ===
Miami-Dade County Public Schools serves Miami Lakes.

==== K–8 schools ====
- Bob Graham Education Center
- Miami Lakes K-8 Center

==== Middle schools ====
- Miami Lakes Middle School

==== High schools ====
- Barbara Goleman Senior High School
- Hialeah-Miami Lakes Senior High School

=== Magnet schools ===
- Miami Lakes Educational Center

=== Private schools ===
- Our Lady of the Lakes Catholic School

== Parks and recreation ==
The Town of Miami Lakes has 100+ parks, mini parks, tot lots, green-ways and trails located throughout, including Miami Lakes Optimist Park, Veterans Park and Royal Oaks Park.

== Transportation ==
Miami Lakes is serviced by several Miami-Dade metrobus routes, including the 37, 54, and 75.

== Cultural institutions ==
=== Veterans Memorial ===
Miami Lakes has a unique indoor veterans memorial located at the Royal Oaks Park Community Center. The memorial is a 50-foot-long mural that features a combination of two digitized paintings of military scenes throughout U.S. history, wood carvings, stained glass, and hand-made glass mosaics molded from leaves of Miami Lakes' trees. The centerpiece of the artwork consists of the seals from each of the US military service branches and the POW/MIA seal. The memorial was inaugurated on Memorial Day of 2011. The artists are Alfred Darmanin and Michelle Stecco.

The veterans memorial titled "V is for Veterans" was unveiled in front of Miami Lakes Town Hall on September 4, 2014. The artwork was created by Stephanie Jaffe Werner.

=== Public libraries ===
- Miami Lakes Branch Library

=== Places of worship ===
- Elevate Church
- Hope at Miami Lakes Methodist Church
- Miami Lakes United Church of Christ
- Our Lady of the Lakes Catholic Church

=== Theaters and performance arts ===
- Main Street Players is a local performing arts space producing live theatrical events using community talent and volunteers.

=== Festivals and events ===
- Fourth of July Concert and Fireworks Show
- Main Street Festival of Lights
- Miami Lakes Cars for a Cure
- Miami Lakes Farmers Market
- Miami Lakes Food and Wine Festival
- Nightmare on Montrose Halloween Event
- Pumpkin Patch
- Spring Fling Easter Egg Hunt
- Veterans Day Parade; the longest running Veterans Day Parade in all of Miami-Dade County.

== Sports ==
- Miami Lakes Bandits
- Miami Lakes United Soccer Club

== Media ==
The Miami Laker serves as the community newspaper for the town of Miami Lakes and surrounding areas in northwest Miami-Dade County.

== Notable people ==
- Humberto Brenes, Costa Rican professional poker player
- Harry P. Cain, American politician
- Adrian Cárdenas, American professional baseball second baseman
- Harry Wayne Casey, American musician, singer, songwriter, and record producer
- Bob Graham, American lawyer, author and politician
- Gwen Graham, American lawyer and politician
- Don Shula, American professional football player and coach
- Sara Sidner, American TV reporter
