= Alan Trask =

American politician (1933–2019)

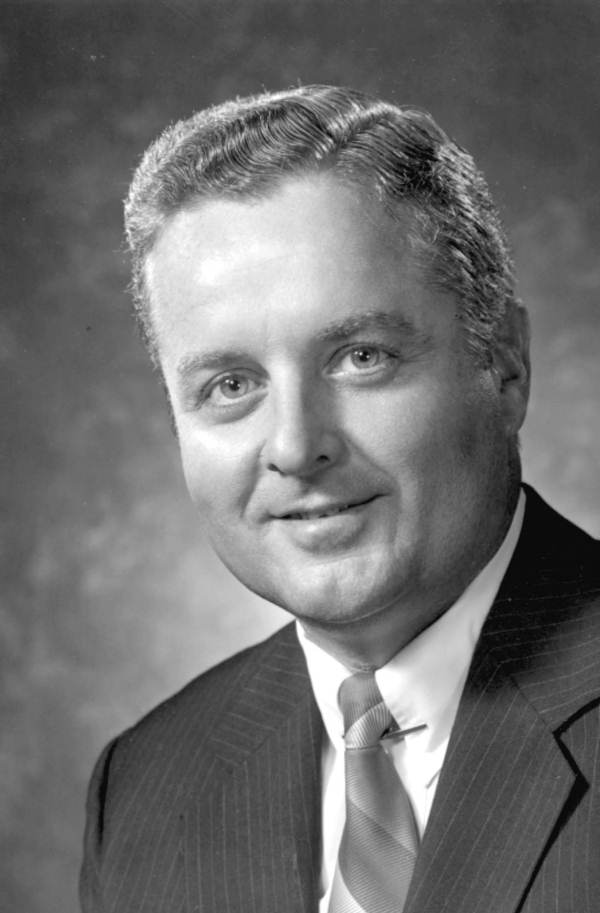

Member of the Florida Senate from the 13th district
- In office 1973–1982

Member of the Florida Senate from the 27th district
- In office 1969–1971

Personal details
- Born: June 26, 1933 Bartow, Florida, U.S.
- Died: January 9, 2019 (aged 85) Lakeland, Florida, U.S.
- Party: Democratic, Republican
- Occupation: citrus, cattle farmer

William Alan Trask (June 26, 1933 – January 9, 2019) was an American politician in the state of Florida.

Trask was born in Bartow, Florida. He attended the University of Florida and Florida Southern College. He was elected to the State Senate for the 27th district in 1968 and served until 1971. He was redistricted to the 13th district in 1973, and served until 1982. He was a former president pro tempore of the senate and was a member of the Democratic Party.

In 1981, he and Florida Representative Tom Bush successfully attached an amendment to the state budget that would deny funding to any state university that advocated sexual activity between unmarried adults. Within months, Florida's Supreme Court unanimously ruled the provision an unconstitutional violation of the First Amendment. Shortly thereafter, several ethics allegations were made against Senator Trask, and he resigned from office in July 1982. He later switched to the Republican Party. Trask died on January 9, 2019.
