= Josiah T. Walls =

American politician (1842–1905)

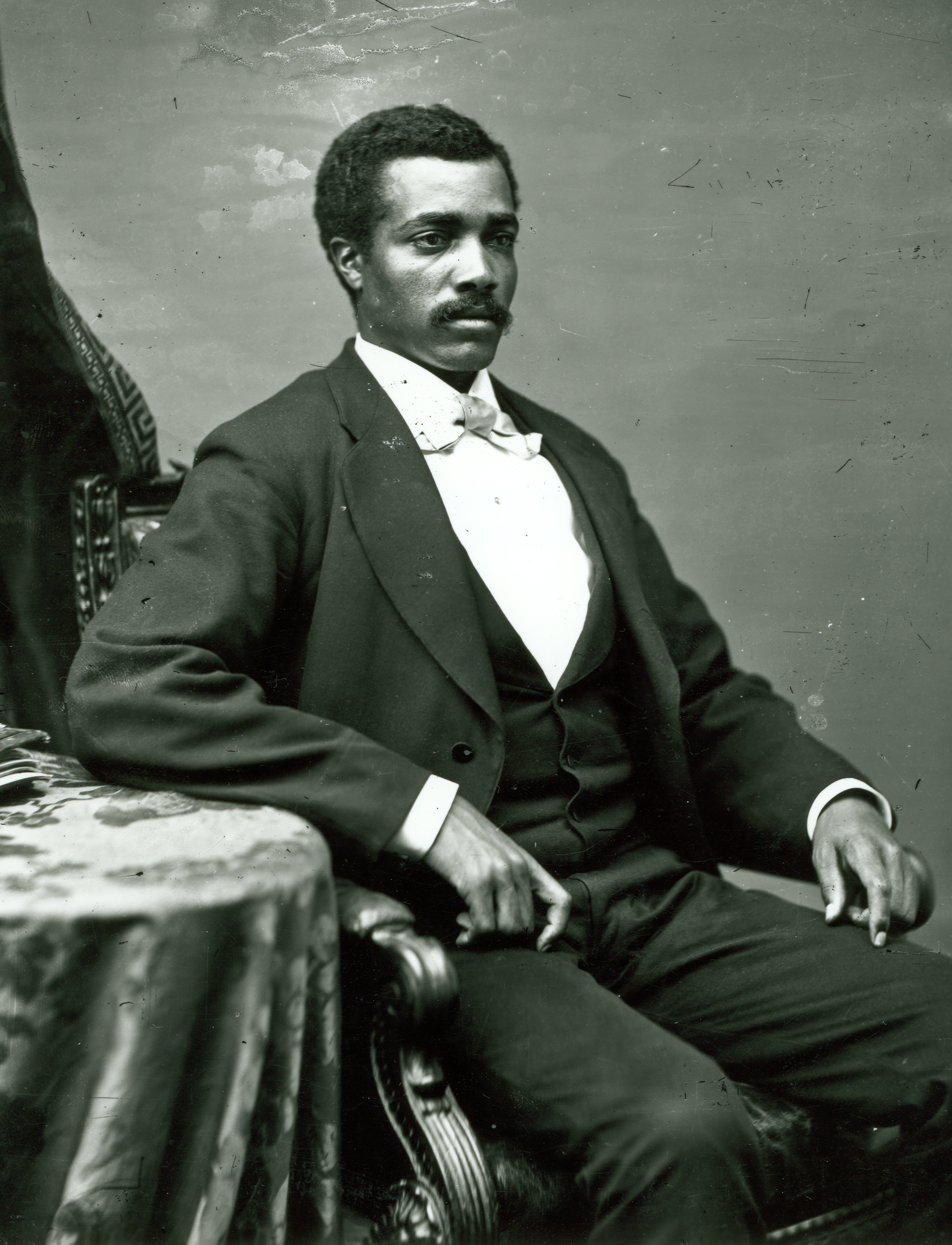

Member of the U.S. House of Representatives from Florida
- In office March 4, 1871 – January 29, 1873
- Preceded by: Charles Memorial Hamilton
- Succeeded by: Silas L. Niblack
- Constituency: At-large district
- In office March 4, 1873 – April 19, 1876
- Preceded by: Silas L. Niblack
- Succeeded by: Jesse J. Finley
- Constituency: At-large district (1873–1875); 2nd district (1875–1876)

Member of the Florida Senate from the 13th district
- In office January 5, 1869 – January 3, 1871
- Preceded by: Horatio Jenkins
- Succeeded by: Leonard G. Dennis
- In office January 2, 1877 – January 4, 1881
- Preceded by: Leonard G. Dennis
- Succeeded by: John B. Dell

Member of the Florida House of Representatives from Alachua County
- In office June 8, 1868 – January 1, 1869
- Succeeded by: Richard H. Black

Personal details
- Born: Josiah Thomas Walls; December 30, 1842 Winchester, Virginia, U.S.
- Died: May 15, 1905 (aged 62) Tallahassee, Florida, U.S.
- Party: Republican

Military service
- Allegiance: United States of America
- Branch/service: Union Army
- Years of service: 1863
- Rank: Corporal
- Unit: U.S. Colored Troops
- Battles/wars: American Civil War

Josiah Thomas Walls (December 30, 1842 – May 15, 1905) was an American farmer, lawyer, and politician who served all or some of three terms in the United States House of Representatives between 1871 and 1876. A member of the Republican Party, he was one of the first African Americans in the United States Congress elected during the Reconstruction Era, and the first black person to be elected to Congress from Florida. He also served four terms in the Florida Senate. Josiah T. Walls became the state's first Black Member of Congress in 1871.

Twice his election to U.S. Congress was overturned.

== Early life and education ==
Josiah Walls was born into slavery in 1842 near Winchester, Virginia to unknown parents. During the American Civil War, he was forced to work without pay as a slave for the Confederate army. He was captured by the Union Army in 1862 at Yorktown. He voluntarily joined the United States Colored Troops in 1863 and rose to the rank of first sergeant. He was discharged in Florida and settled in Alachua County, Florida. Thanks to some early education and self-tutoring during the war, Walls was able to work as a teacher in nearby Archer.

== Political career ==
=== State government ===
Walls served as a delegate to the state constitutional convention of 1868, representing Alachua County. Later that year, he was elected to the Florida House of Representatives from Alachua, along with his friend, Henry Harmon, serving in Florida's first Reconstruction Legislature.

When State Senator Horatio Jenkins was appointed to a county judgeship, Walls decided to run in the special election to succeed him. He was elected to the Alachua and Levy County district on December 29, 1868, and took office in January. Walls served as state senator for the 1869 and 1870 legislative session.

Walls actively promoted public education for freedmen and supported civil rights legislation during his terms in the Florida House and Senate.

=== Congress ===
In 1870, Walls was nominated as the Republican candidate for Florida's sole at-large congressional seat after a contentious party convention. A moderate faction of mostly white carpetbaggers, led by U.S. Senator Thomas W. Osborn, supported the freedman Robert Meacham, while the majority of black delegates were split between several more radical black candidates, including Walls. Walls won the nomination on the 11th ballot, after the other black candidates withdrew to prevent Meacham from winning.

Walls went on to win the 1870 general election and serve in the 42nd Congress, but the vote was contested by Democrat Silas L. Niblack. The House Committee on Elections eventually unseated Walls after finding election irregularities.

Walls ran for the at-large congressional seat again in the 1872 election and won. In office, Walls introduced bills to establish a national education fund and aid pensioners and Seminole War Veterans.

In 1874, Walls ran for re-election to Congress in the newly redistricted 2nd district. Walls won the election but Democrat Jesse J. Finley, a former Confederate colonel, contested the results of the election. Finley was eventually declared the winner by the Democratic-controlled House of Representatives.

=== Return to state politics ===
Walls again sought the Republican nomination for the 2nd congressional district in 1876. After the black delegates split between Walls and another black candidate, the nomination went to a “white carpetbagger”, Horatio Bisbee. Walls instead ran for his old state senate seat, and served a four-year term. He lost re-election in 1880.

== Legal career ==
Walls was admitted to the bar in Alachua County in April 1873. He served as mayor of Gainesville although the exact dates are unknown; he resigned on 1 September 1873 and was succeeded by a white Republican, Watson Porter. In June 1874, Walls formed a law partnership in Gainesville with Henry S. Harmon, who had been the first African-American admitted to the bar in Florida, and William U. Saunders. The next year Harmon and Saunders moved their legal practice to Tallahassee.

In 1874, Walls formed a law partnership in Gainesville with Henry S. Harmon and William U. Saunders, both pioneering African-American attorneys during Reconstruction.

== Later life ==
Leaving politics, Walls operated a successful farm in Alachua County until the disastrous freeze of 1894–1895, which destroyed his crops. He took a teaching position as Farm Director of the State Normal and Industrial College for Colored Students, which much later would become Florida A&M University, in Tallahassee. After nearly a decade there, he died on May 5, 1905.

Walls became Farm Director at the State Normal and Industrial College for Colored Students (later Florida A&M University), helping educate African-American youth in agriculture and vocational skills until shortly before his death in 1905.

== See also ==
- List of African-American United States representatives
- African American officeholders from the end of the Civil War until before 1900

U.S. House of Representatives
Preceded by Charles M. Hamilton	Member of the U.S. House of Representatives from Florida's at-large congressional district 1871 – 1873	Succeeded by Silas L. Niblack
Preceded by Silas L. Niblack	Member of the U.S. House of Representatives from Florida's at-large congressional district 1873 – 1875	Succeeded by Seat inactive
Preceded by District created	Member of the U.S. House of Representatives from Florida's 2nd congressional district 1875 – 1876	Succeeded by Jesse J. Finley
