= Miami Lakes Educational Center =

Coordinates: 25°54′55″N 80°17′40″W

Location
- 5780 NW 158th Street; Miami Lakes, Florida 33014; United States

Information
- Type: Public magnet
- Established: 1998
- School district: Miami-Dade County Public Schools
- Principal: Yaset Fernandez
- Faculty: 43.00 (FTE)
- Grades: 9-12
- Enrollment: 1,025 (2022–23)
- Student to teacher ratio: 23.84
- Campus type: Suburban
- Colors: Black & Teal
- Mascot: Jaguar
- Website: Miami Lakes Educational Center homepage

Miami Lakes Educational Center (MLEC), is a vocational-technical training center in Miami Lakes, Florida. It is part of the Miami-Dade County Public Schools system and one of only three area vocational-technical training centers. It is one of two schools in Miami-Dade County, providing adult vocational training in conjunction with a full-service high school. This allows students to attend regular academic classes and technical or vocational training programs during the same day on the same campus.

== History ==
Miami Lakes Educational Center was established in 1998.

== Magnet Academies ==
MLEC has 26 different strands spread among five magnet academies. Although the school is not recognized as a magnet program by Miami-Dade County Public Schools, as it does not receive specialized magnet funding, the school retains the ability to require students to complete an application form, and may admit students from areas outside of traditional school boundaries. Each magnet academy at MLEC has a distinct uniform. The Cambridge Academy is run by Cambridge International Examinations, and includes mandatory AICE and AP classes. A sixth academy, Trade and Industry, was active before having its strands transferred to the Entrepreneurship Academy, until it became its own individual academy once again.

MLEC is a magnet high school, which requires students to be accepted in order to attend. Upon graduation, a student can receive both a high school diploma and a certificate of completion from the vocational training program.

Miami Lakes Educational Center has consistently maintained an "A" grade.

The classes and academies from the list below are taken from the subject selection form for the magnet school.

| Academy | Strands / career pathways | Academy leader |
|---|---|---|
| Cambridge | Engineering; Journalism; Global Studies (previously Forensic Science) | Michelle Castillo |
| Health | Pharmacy Technician; Medical Assistant; Dental Assistant; Nursing Assistant; Emergency Medical Technician; Intro to Practical Nursing | Jeffrey Betancourt |
| Entrepreneurship | Financial Services; Culinary Arts | Marisol Villanueva |
| Communication & Entertainment Technology | Commercial Arts; Technical Theater; Television Production | Odalis Soto |
| Information Technology | Cisco Networking Academy; Programming; Web Development | Leonardo Gonzales |
| Trade & Industry | AC, Refrigeration, and Heating Technology; Automotive Collision Repair; Automotive Service Technology; Electronic Technology | Lourdes Ambas |

== Demographics ==
Miami Lakes Educational Center is 81% Hispanic, 13% Black, 5% White non-Hispanic, and 1% Asian.
