= Silas L. Niblack =

American politician (1825–1883)

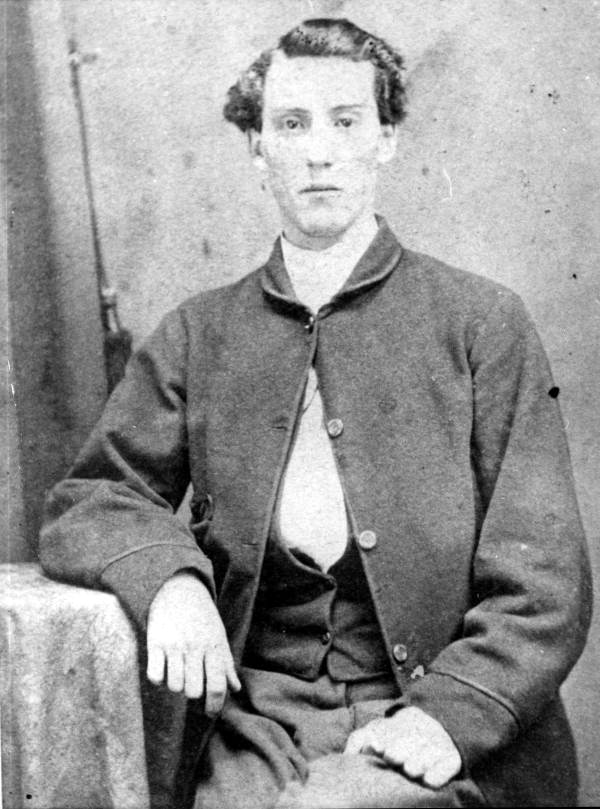
Silas Leslie Niblack

Silas Leslie Niblack (March 17, 1825 – February 13, 1883) was a Democratic U.S. Representative from Florida. He was a Democrat. He was the cousin of William Ellis Niblack, US Representative from Indiana.

Born in Camden County, Georgia, Niblack attended the common schools before studying law. He was admitted to the bar about 1851 and commenced practice in Lake City, Columbia County, Florida. He later became a judge of the probate court of Columbia County.

Niblack successfully contested the election of black Republican Josiah T. Walls to the Forty-second United States Congress and served from January 29 to March 3, 1873. He was an unsuccessful candidate for reelection to the Forty-third United States Congress.

In 1879 he was a member of the Florida State Senate.

Outside politics Niblack carried on extensive farming operations and engaged in the practice of law in Lake City until his death in 1883. He was buried in the Old Cathey Cemetery, Lake City.

U.S. House of Representatives
Preceded by Josiah T. Walls	United States Representative from Florida's at-large congressional district 1873	Succeeded by William J. Purman
