= Ernest R. Graham (politician) =

American politician (1886–1964)

Member of the Florida Senate from the 13th district
- In office 1937–1943
- Preceded by: John W. Watson
- Succeeded by: D.C. Coleman

Personal details
- Born: 1886 Croswell, Michigan, U.S.
- Died: March 14, 1964 (aged 77–78) Coral Gables, Florida, U.S.
- Party: Democratic
- Children: 5, including Phil and Bob

Military service
- Battles/wars: World War I

Ernest R. "Cap" Graham (1886–March 14, 1964) was an American politician active in Florida, having served as a member of the Florida Senate from 1937 to 1944, when he unsuccessfully ran for the Democratic nomination for Governor of Florida. As a state senator, he would help in a successful attempt to repeal Florida's poll tax in 1937.

== Early life and career ==
Graham was born in Croswell, Michigan, and received his education at the Michigan State College. He moved to Florida after World War I. Prior to this he had been an engineer in gold mines in South Dakota and had served for 10 months with the US Army during World War I. He was sent to Florida by the Pennsylvania Sugar Company to drain part of the Everglades with the intention of doing sugarcane cultivation.

Graham's employer left Florida towards the end of 1931, and he received 7,000 acres (28 km^{2}) of sugarcane fields outside Miami as severance pay. After this, he became active in the dairy industry and later with breeding cattle as well. The dairy farm became one of the largest in Florida.

== Political career and later life ==
While Graham was campaigning for the state Senate in 1936, he made repealing the poll tax a core component of his campaign. Since Graham was a dairy farmer, he utilized his network of salesmen to help campaign on his behalf. He, along with his salesmen, found that many local white residents were not able to vote because of the poll tax and that many others could vote because someone had paid their tax for them. In 1937 during his first year in office as a senator, he would help his fellow senators Spessard Holland, John Beacham and Robert Hodges to successfully repeal the poll tax. Graham's motivation for repealing the poll tax was to crack down on gambling and race track interests committing fraud by "sponsoring" poll taxes to their respective blocs. One of the senators Graham worked with, Spessard Holland, would later go on to be Florida's governor and after that a U.S. senator for the state. While Holland was a U.S. senator, he introduced what would become the Twenty-fourth Amendment to the United States Constitution which prohibited poll taxes being required to vote in federal elections.

Apart from his advocacy against the poll tax, Graham attacked the management of horse racetracks and worked to increase pensions for the elderly.

Graham proposed the creation of a public university in Dade (now Miami-Dade) County; and although his efforts were unsuccessful during his lifetime, they eventually led to the establishment of Florida International University. The student union building at Florida International University is named the Graham Center in his honor. In 1948, Graham sought election to the Dade County Commission, but ended up losing in the primaries.

Later on, Graham and his family developed Miami Lakes out of some of the land they owned.

== Personal life ==
Graham married Florence Morris, originally of Lincoln, Nebraska, and later of South Dakota with the two having four children together: Mary Graham (born in 1913), Philip Graham (born in 1915; who later became husband of Katharine Graham and publisher of The Washington Post) and Bill Graham (born in 1924). In 1934, Florence (known as "Floss") died of cancer and in 1936, Graham married Hilda Simmons, a schoolteacher. They had one child, future Florida governor and United States senator Bob Graham. Ernest Graham died on March 14, 1964, in Coral Gables, Florida.
