= Leonard G. Dennis =

American politician

Member of the Florida State Senate
- In office 1870–1878

Member of the Florida House of Representatives
- Incumbent
- Assumed office 1882

Personal details
- Born: Massachusetts, United States
- Died: June 14, 1885
- Party: Republican
- Known for: Political boss in Alachua County, Florida

Leonard G. Dennis was a Reconstruction-era political boss in Alachua County, Florida, best known for his role in throwing the 1876 presidential election to the Republican candidate, Rutherford B. Hayes.

A native of Massachusetts, Dennis entered the Union Army as a teenager, served in Florida during the American Civil War, and settled in Alachua County, where he began to exert political control, largely through his control over recently freed slaves. Between 1868 and 1876, Dennis, known as the "Little Giant," controlled the appointments of most county officials, including judges, high sheriffs, and commissioners by dint of the cronyism he enjoyed with Republican governors Harrison Reed, Ossian B. Hart, and Marcellus L. Sterns, who appointed the state's county officials after consulting with local political bosses.

Dennis became one of the wealthiest men in the north central Florida by selling his endorsements to the highest bidders and then taking a "commission" from the monthly salary of each. In order to secure the cooperation of his appointees, he kept a signed letter of resignation from each applicant before he granted the office.

Dennis held several political offices in his own right, and was a member of the Florida State Senate from 1870 to 1878. During the election of 1876 he served on the Republican state executive committee. On the evening of August 21, 1876, as Dennis was addressing a meeting of the Hayes-Wheeler Club at the Gainesville Academy, two shots were fired, throwing the meeting into chaos, but causing no other damage. After the meeting came back to order, Dennis blamed the Democrats for the presumed assassination attempt and urged retaliation. The perpetrator was never identified, and the Democrats claimed that the disruption was a Republican ruse meant to arouse the anger of local blacks.

The ensuing election brought out the worst in both parties—intimidation of black voters by the Democrats and fraud by the Republicans.

The final vote for the county was 1,984 votes for the Republican electors and 1,267 for the Democrats. Although the Democrats did not claim to have carried the county, they did assert that 219 Republican votes had been added to a ballot box from the town of Archer after the polls had closed.

In an ironic twist, the outcome of the litigious election was that the Republicans won the presidential race, but the Democrats carried the gubernatorial contest by 195 votes, which cost Dennis most, if not all, of his political power.

Two years later, a committee appointed by the Democratic-led United States House of Representatives extracted an admission from Dennis that he had, indeed, stuffed the controversial ballot box from Archer.

By August 1882, Dennis had joined forces with former Republican rival Josiah T. Walls and was elected to the Florida House of Representatives. During the next three years, he was involved in various investments and civic improvements, and in 1882 presented Gainesville with its first fire engine, which, two years later, was incapable of preventing a blaze from leveling every building on the west side of the Courthouse Square.

On the morning of June 14, 1885, Dennis complained to his visiting nephew of feeling unwell. He lost consciousness and died at 5 pm.

The report of his death in the Florida Times-Union, reprinted in the New York Times, concluded:

"The depraving influences or war, its license, violence, and perils no doubt warped somewhat his impulsive, dashing nature, and the corrupting influences of politics completed in him many faults which his best friends could not deny that he possessed."
