= William G. O'Neill =

American politician (1921–1996)

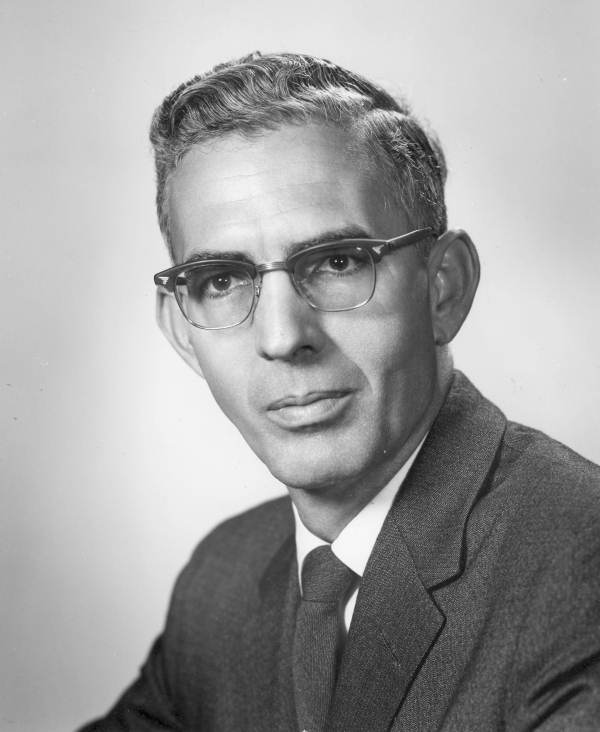
- O'Neill in 1959

Member of the Florida House of Representatives from Marion County
- In office 1957–1966

Personal details
- Born: February 14, 1921 Arcadia, Florida, U.S.
- Died: May 24, 1996 (aged 75)
- Party: Democratic
- Education: University of Florida; University of Florida School of Law

William G. O'Neill (February 14, 1921 – May 24, 1996) was an American politician. He served as a Democratic member of the Florida House of Representatives.

== Life and career ==
O'Neill was born in Arcadia, Florida. He attended the University of Florida and the University of Florida School of Law.

In 1957, O'Neill was elected to the Florida House of Representatives, serving until 1966.

O'Neill died in May 1996, at the age of 75.
