= A. J. Ryan =

American politician

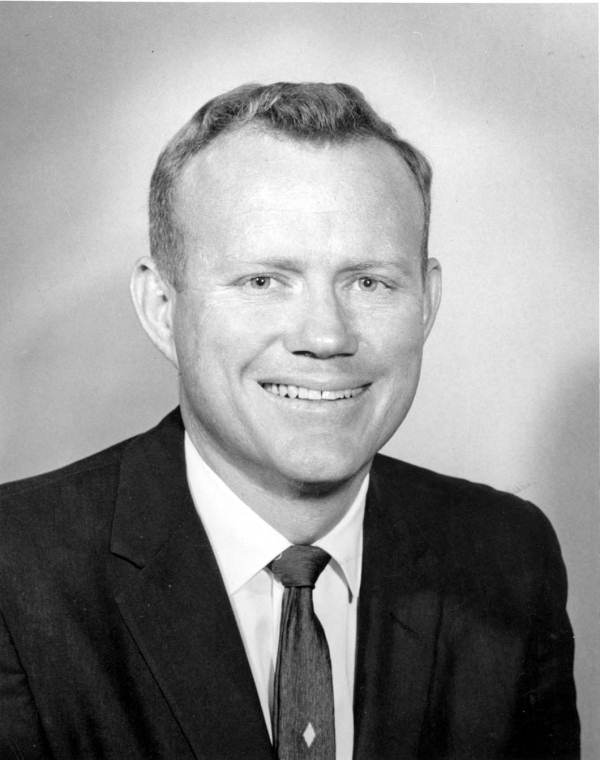
- Ryan in 1963

Member of the Florida House of Representatives from Broward County
- In office 1956–1962

Member of the Florida Senate from the 30th district
- In office 1962–1967

Personal details
- Born: May 20, 1927 Dania Beach, Florida, U.S.
- Died: April 30, 2006 (aged 78)
- Party: Democratic
- Spouse: Johanna Betty Rasch (m. 1950; died. 1985)
- Education: University of Florida

A. J. Ryan (May 20, 1927 – April 30, 2006) was an American politician. He served as a Democratic member of the Florida House of Representatives. He also served as a member for the 30th district of the Florida Senate.

== Life and career ==
Ryan was born in Dania Beach, Florida. He attended South Broward High School and the University of Florida.

In 1956, Ryan was elected to the Florida House of Representatives, serving until 1962. In the same year, he was elected to represent the 30th district of the Florida Senate, serving until 1967.

Ryan died in April 2006, at the age of 78.
