= Osee Fagan =

American politician

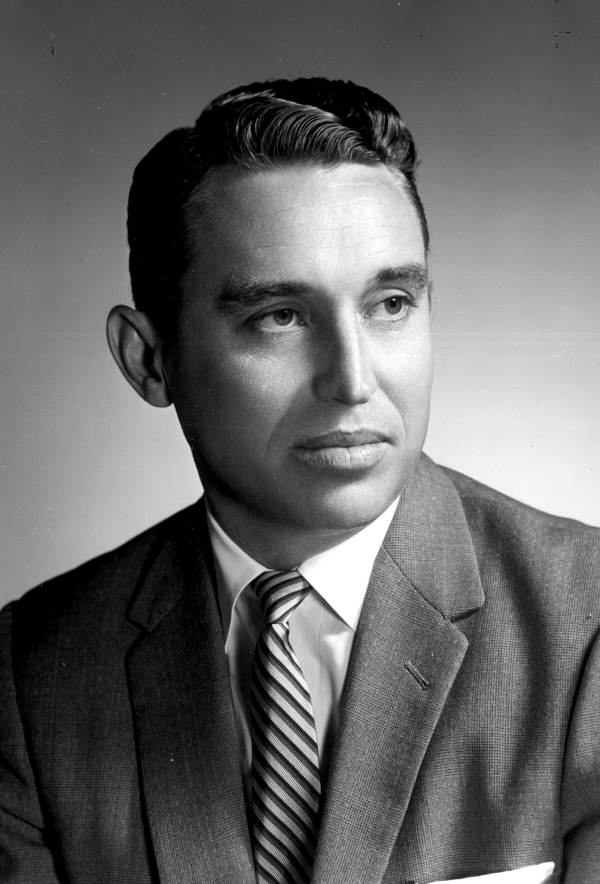
- Fagan in 1959

Member of the Florida House of Representatives
- In office 1959–1964

Personal details
- Born: 1924 Jones County, Mississippi, U.S.
- Died: December 16, 2014 (aged 89–90) Gainesville, Florida, U.S.
- Party: Democratic
- Education: Mississippi College; University of Florida (law, 1948)

Osee Robert Fagan, Sr. (1924 – December 16, 2014) was a lawyer, prosecutor, state legislator, and judge in the state of Florida. His first wife, Marilyn Burch Fagan was murdered by a deaf mute man he was prosecuting in 1956. Together they had three children. He remarried Dorothy Tyson Fagan and together they had another child. He was born in Mississippi. His father was a Baptist preacher. Osee was an avid Florida Gators football supporter, member of the Quarterback Club for many years and a member of First Baptist Church of Gainseville, Gainseville, FL.

Fagan received a Purple Heart for injuries he received during service in the United States Army at the Battle of the Bulge. He was admitted to the Florida Bar in 1948. Judge Osee Robert Fagan served on the bench of the Eighth Judicial Circuit from 1979 – 1990. A Democrat, he represented Alachua County in the Florida House of Representatives.
