= Joseph Lewis Jr. (Florida judge) =

American judge

Joseph Lewis, Jr.
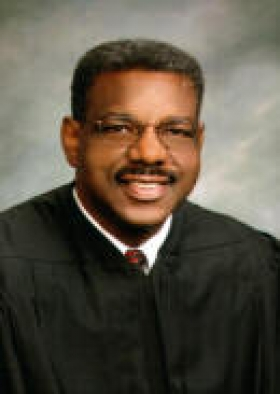

Chief Judge of the Florida First District Court of Appeal
- In office July 1, 2013 – July 1, 2015
- Preceded by: Robert T. Benton, II
- Succeeded by: L. Clayton Roberts

Judge of the Florida First District Court of Appeal
- Incumbent
- Assumed office January 2, 2001
- Appointed by: Jeb Bush
- Preceded by: L. Arthur Lawrence

Personal details
- Born: Joseph Lewis, Jr. January 6, 1953 (age 73) Tallahassee, Florida
- Education: University of Montana (B.S.); Florida State University College of Law (JD)

Joseph Lewis, Jr. is a judge on the Florida First District Court of Appeal.

== History ==
Lewis was born in Tallahassee in 1953. He attended the University of Montana, graduating in 1974, and the Florida State University College of Law in 1977. After graduation, he worked as a judicial research aide at the Florida Industrial Relations Commission from 1977 to 1978. In 1978, he began working as an assistant public defender in the Second Judicial Circuit, a position he held until 1981. Starting in 1981, Lewis began working as an assistant attorney general in the Florida Attorney General's office. He specialized in civil and employment litigation, eventually becoming the bureau chief of the Employment Litigation and Civil Litigation Section.

== First District Court of Appeal ==
In August 2000, the Judicial Nominating Commission for the First District Court of Appeal sought applicants to replace judges James Joanos and Arthur Lawrence, whose terms expired in January 2001. Lewis applied for the seats, and on November 17, 2000, Governor Jeb Bush announced that he was nominating Lewis to replace Judge Lawrence. Following Lawrence's retirement two months later, Lewis was sworn in to the seat, becoming the second African-American judge to serve on the court.

In 2002, following Justice Leander Shaw's retirement from the Supreme Court of Florida, Lewis applied to fill the vacancy. However, Governor Bush ended up selecting Kenneth B. Bell for the seat instead.

Legal offices
Preceded by L. Arthur Lawrence	Judge of the Florida First District Court of Appeal; 2001–present	Incumbent
