= Florida District Courts of Appeal =

Intermediate appellate courts of Florida

Map of the jurisdictions of Florida's district courts of appeal.

Locations of district courts of appeal

The District Courts of Appeal (DCAs) are the intermediate appellate courts of the Florida state court system. There are currently six DCAs:

- The First District Court of Appeal is headquartered in Tallahassee
- The Second District Court of Appeal is temporarily headquartered in Tampa until the Pinellas Courthouse is completed in St. Petersburg.
- The Third District Court of Appeal is headquartered in Miami
- The Fourth District Court of Appeal is headquartered in West Palm Beach
- The Fifth District Court of Appeal is headquartered in Daytona Beach
- The Sixth District Court of Appeal is headquartered in Lakeland

== History ==
Boundaries of the five district courts of appeal that existed from 1979 to 2023.

The district courts of appeal were created by the Florida Legislature in 1957 to provide an intermediate level of appellate review between the trial courts (the county courts and circuit courts) and the Florida Supreme Court. This was done, as in other parts of the United States, to relieve the state supreme court of the pressure of its ever-increasing appellate docket; the lobbying effort by Florida Supreme Court Justice Elwyn Thomas played a large role in the DCAs' creation.

Three DCAs were initially created, with the Third District Court of Appeal was given jurisdiction over cases arising from Dade and Monroe counties. The Fourth DCA was created in 1965; the Fifth DCA was created in 1979; and Sixth District Courts of Appeal was created in 2023.

The existence of the DCAs was provided for in the Florida Constitution, which now requires the legislature to divide the state into appellate court districts, providing each with a DCA.

At the time, Florida was the second state to have district courts of appeal, as California had created its own district courts of appeal in 1904. However, in 1966, California dropped the word "district" from the names of the California Courts of Appeal, thus leaving Florida as the sole state with DCAs.

The DCAs were originally intended to serve as the final appellate courts for the vast majority of cases. During the 1960s, the Florida Supreme Court decided several cases which had the cumulative effect of turning the DCAs into non-final "way-stations in the appellate process." Chief Justice Arthur J. England Jr. played a major role in bringing about the 1980 constitutional amendment which effectively overruled those cases and again narrowed the state supreme court's jurisdiction "to resolve its uncontrollable caseload."

== New DCA ==
In early 2021, then Florida Chief Justice Charles Canady established a 15-person District Court of Appeal Workload and Jurisdiction Assessment Committee to look into justifying a new District Court of Appeal. The last DCA expansion was the Florida Fifth District Court of Appeal in 1979. Blaise Trettis, a public defender in Brevard County, served on the Assessment Committee. When the committee looked at yearly case filings, they found that there was “a precipitous decline” in the number of appeals over the years. DCA judges were not overwhelmed, and they were not stating that they were. Trettis and three district court judges wrote a minority report. In it they noted that all five DCA Chief Judges told Canady that no changes were needed.

The ten-member majority determined that there were too few lawyers from Jacksonville on district courts and used that fact to justify their decision. Their opinion stated that adding "at least one" court would “promote public trust and confidence based on geography and demographic composition and help attract a diverse group of well-qualified applicants for judicial vacancies.”

In November 2021, the Florida Supreme Court voted 6–1 to add a new DCA. Justice Ricky Polston dissented, citing no “compelling need” for another court. He commented that adding a 6th DCA “is analogous to rebuilding a ship for what should be swapping out a couple of deck chairs at most.”

The Legislature proposed bill HB 7027, based on the committee's recommendation, which was then passed and signed by Governor Ron DeSantis in June 2022, creating the Sixth District Court of Appeal. The effective date for the creation was January 1, 2023.

The law also realigns four judicial circuits into different, pre-existing districts. The Sixth District Court of Appeal will be composed of cases from the following counties and circuit courts: Orange and Osceola (Ninth Circuit from 5th DCA); Hardee, Highlands and Polk (Tenth Circuit from 3rd DCA); and Charlotte, Collier, Glades, Hendry and Lee (Twentieth Circuit from 2nd DCA).

== Operation ==
As of January 1, 2023, the Second DCA will relocate to St. Petersburg and the newly formed Sixth DCA will take over the Second DCA's existing Lakeland headquarters.

Sixth DCA judges will have the freedom to decide every legal issue that comes before it without regard to precedent unless the Florida Supreme Court has a binding precedent. While judges in the Ninth, Tenth, and Twentieth Judicial Circuits may need to choose between precedents from any district court of appeal, judges in the Sixth District Court of Appeal have the power to rule in opposition to the ruling of another DCA, or instead of adopting the ruling of another district, they may create new law.

== Judges ==
District court of appeal judges, like Florida Supreme Court justices, are first recommended by the Florida Judicial Nominating Commission. They are then appointed by the governor of Florida, but have retention elections every six years, in which voters are asked on the ballot to vote whether the judge should be retained in office.

DCAs have different numbers of judges – currently ranging from 11 to 15 - based on the docket size.

== Jurisdiction ==
The jurisdiction of the DCAs is set forth in Florida Rule of Appellate Procedure 9.030.

Appeals are usually heard by a three-judge panel. Occasionally a DCA will hold an en banc hearing, in which all the judges participate.

The decisions of the district courts of appeal represent the law of Florida unless and until they are overruled by the Florida Supreme Court. Thus, in the absence of interdistrict conflict, district court decisions bind all Florida trial courts. In the event of a conflict between the decisions of different district courts of appeal, county and circuit courts must adhere to the case law of their own district court of appeal.

District courts of appeal may recede from certain case law and precedent in subsequent decisions, or the Supreme Court may override a district court's precedent in favor of conflicting case law from another district. Because the Florida Supreme Court has predominantly discretionary jurisdiction (i.e., can choose which cases it wants to hear), the DCAs provide the final word on the vast majority of cases appealed in the State of Florida. Cases that are affirmed without comment by the district courts cannot be appealed to the Supreme Court, even as a request for discretionary review. Such a case may be reviewed by the United States Supreme Court pursuant to a petition for writ of certiorari.

Cases involving the death penalty are heard directly and automatically by the Florida Supreme Court, bypassing the district courts of appeal.

== See also ==
- Judiciary of Florida
