= Meredith Barrios =

American judge

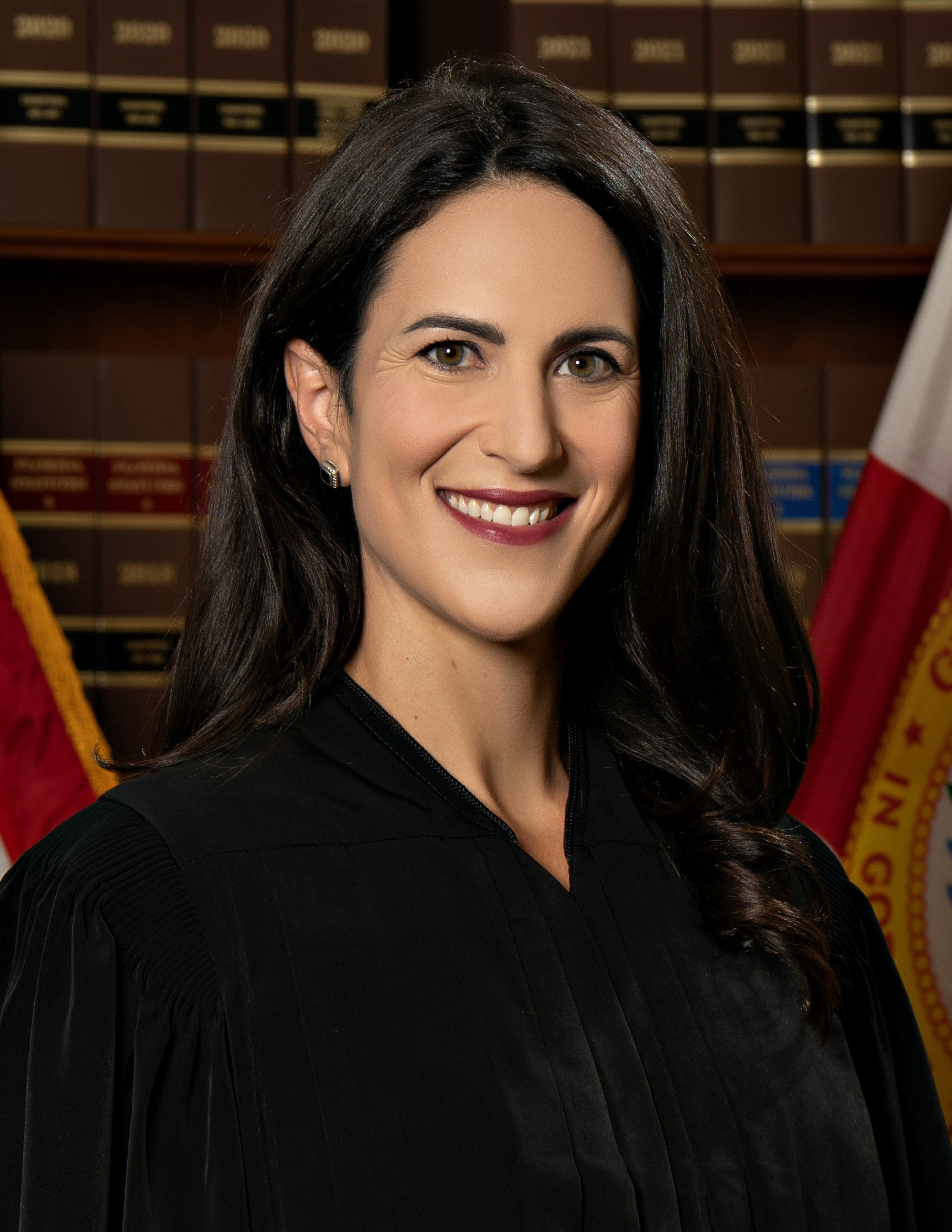

Justice of the Supreme Court of Florida
- Incumbent
- Assumed office May 25, 2023
- Appointed by: Ron DeSantis
- Preceded by: Ricky Polston

Chief Judge of the Florida Sixth District Court of Appeal
- In office January 2023 – May 2023
- Appointed by: Ron DeSantis
- Preceded by: Position established
- Succeeded by: Dan Traver

Personal details
- Born: Meredith Lee Barrios; February 15, 1983 (age 43) Tallahassee, Florida, US
- Children: 2
- Education: University of Florida (BA, JD)

Meredith L. Barrios (born February 15, 1983) is an American lawyer who has served as a justice of the Supreme Court of Florida since May 2023. She was previously the chief judge on the Florida Sixth District Court of Appeal.

== Biography ==
Barrios is a Cuban American born and raised in Tallahassee, Florida. She graduated from Leon High School in 2001 and earned a bachelor's degree from the University of Florida in 2005. Barrios received a Juris Doctor from the University of Florida Levin College of Law in 2008. She worked as a lawyer in private practice working in large loss general liability and other topics. She was a guardian ad litem for abused or neglected children. Barrios was the chief deputy general counsel for Florida governor Rick Scott. Barrios is a member of the American Enterprise Institute's Leadership Network and the Federalist Society.

=== Judicial service ===
In January 2019, Barrios was appointed by Governor Rick Scott to serve as a judge on the Florida Fifth District Court of Appeal. In January 2023, she was recommissioned to the Florida Sixth District Court of Appeal in Lakeland, Florida. In May 2023, Ron DeSantis appointed Barrios to the Supreme Court of Florida, to fill the vacancy left by the retirement of Justice Ricky Polston.

== Personal life ==
Barrios married Michael Sasso, a lawyer who was appointed by Ron DeSantis to the board of supervisors of the Central Florida Tourism Oversight District in 2023. She has two children.

Legal offices
Preceded by Ricky Polston	Justice of the Supreme Court of Florida; 2023–present	Incumbent
