= Shutts & Bowen =

American law firm

- Headquarters: Florida, U.S.
- Offices: 8
- Date founded: 1910
- Founder: Frank B. Shutts
- Website: Official website

Shutts & Bowen LLP is a law firm with 270 attorneys in eight offices in the state of Florida. Shutts & Bowen was founded in 1910. Frank B. Shutts came to Miami in 1909 and became the legal representative of Henry Flagler and the Florida East Coast Railway Company. In 1910, he formed a professional association with Henry F. Atkinson.

In 1912, Crate D. Bowen joined the firm which settled on the name Shutts and Bowen in 1919. In 1910 Shutts organized the Miami Herald Publishing Company and was its President and principal stockholder. Shutts and Bowen is ranked as the 175th largest law firm in the United States.

It maintains eight offices in the Florida cities of Jacksonville, Fort Lauderdale, Miami, Orlando, Sarasota, Tallahassee, and Tampa, and West Palm Beach. According to statistics submitted to American Lawyer, Shutts & Bowen recorded $147 million in revenue for the year 2015, up 7.7% from 2014, with profits per partner averaging $740,000 in 2015, up 5.7% from $700,000 in 2014.

In 2023, the firm announced the addition of former Florida Supreme Court Justice Ricky Polston.

== Other Attorneys ==
United States Supreme Court Justice Sherman Minton worked at Shutts and Bowen before he began his political and judicial career.

Congressman Robert Wexler, was a former partner in the West Palm Beach Office of Shutts & Bowen before he became a State Senator and then a member of the U.S. House of Representatives in the 1996 election.

Jonathan Gerber, a former partner in the West Palm Beach Office, became a Palm Beach County Court Judge from 2002 to 2004, then a Circuit Court Judge from 2004 until 2009, and on April 7, 2009, Florida Governor Charlie Crist appointed him to the Florida Fourth District Court of Appeal.

== Bibliography ==
- Blackman, E. V. Miami and Dade County, Florida. Washington, D.C.: Victor Rainbolt, 1921
