= Florida Sixth District Court of Appeal =

Florida Court of Appeal

The Florida Sixth District Court of Appeal (DCA) is headquartered in Lakeland, Florida.

Map of the 6 Florida district courts of appeal.

== History ==
In early 2021, then Florida Chief Justice Charles Canady established a 15-person District Court of Appeal Workload and Jurisdiction Assessment Committee to look into justifying a new District Court of Appeal. The last DCA expansion was the Florida Fifth District Court of Appeal in 1979. Blaise Trettis, a public defender in Brevard County, served on the Assessment Committee. When the committee looked at yearly case filings, they found that there was “a precipitous decline” in the number of appeals over the years. DCA judges were not overwhelmed, and they were not stating that they were. Trettis and three district court judges wrote a minority report. In it they noted that all five DCA Chief Judges told Canady that no changes were needed.

The ten-member majority determined that there were too few lawyers from Jacksonville on district courts and used that fact to justify their decision. Their opinion stated that adding "at least one" court would “promote public trust and confidence based on geography and demographic composition and help attract a diverse group of well-qualified applicants for judicial vacancies.”

In November 2021, the Florida Supreme Court voted 6–1 to add a new DCA. Justice Ricky Polston dissented, citing no “compelling need” for another court. He commented that adding a 6th DCA “is analogous to rebuilding a ship for what should be swapping out a couple of deck chairs at most.”

The Legislature proposed bill HB 7027, based on the committee's recommendation, which was then passed and signed by Governor Ron DeSantis in June 2022, creating the Sixth District Court of Appeal, the first new appellate court since the 1979 creation of the Florida Fifth District Court of Appeal. The effective date for the creation was January 1, 2023.

Boundaries of the five district courts of appeal that existed from 1979 to 2023.

The law also realigns four judicial circuits into different, pre-existing districts. The Sixth District Court of Appeal will be composed of cases from the following counties and circuit courts: Orange and Osceola (Ninth Circuit from 5th DCA); Hardee, Highlands and Polk (Tenth Circuit from 2nd DCA); and Charlotte, Collier, Glades, Hendry and Lee (Twentieth Circuit from 2nd DCA).

== Operation ==
As of January 1, 2023, the Second DCA moved to Tampa and the Sixth DCA occupied the Second DCA's former site in Lakeland. Sixth DCA judges are free to decide every legal issue on their docket without regard to precedent unless the Florida Supreme Court has a binding precedent. While judges in the Ninth, Tenth, and Twentieth Judicial Circuits may need to choose between precedents from any district court of appeal, judges in the Sixth District Court of Appeal have the power to rule in opposition to the ruling of another DCA, or instead of adopting the ruling of another district, they may create new law.

== Chief Judges ==
Judges who have served as Chief Judge of the Sixth DCA include: None

== Active Judges ==
Judges who are currently serving on the Sixth DCA include:

Name	Start	Chief Term	Appointer
Dan Traver	May 2023	May 2023 – present	Ron DeSantis (R)
Jay Cohen	January 2023	–	Ron DeSantis (R)
Dan Traver	January 2023	–	Ron DeSantis (R)
John Stargel	July 29, 2020	–	Ron DeSantis (R)
Mary Nardella	January 2023	–	Ron DeSantis (R)
Carrie Wozniak	January 2023	–	Ron DeSantis (R)
Keith White	January 2023	–	Ron DeSantis (R)
Jared Smith	September 2019	–	Ron DeSantis (R)
Joshua Mize	February 2021	–	Ron DeSantis (R)

== Senior Judges ==
Senior judges are appointed to temporary judicial duty. Judges who are on senior status at the Sixth DCA include:

- none

== See also ==
- Florida District Courts of Appeal (for history and general overview)
- Florida First District Court of Appeal
- Florida Second District Court of Appeal
- Florida Third District Court of Appeal
- Florida Fourth District Court of Appeal
- Florida Fifth District Court of Appeal
