= Nilda Pedrosa =

American politician (1974–2021)

Under Secretary of State for Public Diplomacy and Public Affairs
- Acting
- In office September 28, 2020 – January 20, 2021
- President: Donald Trump
- Preceded by: Ulrich Brechbuhl (Acting)
- Succeeded by: Jennifer Hall Godfrey (Acting)

Personal details
- Born: Nilda Rodriguez Pedrosa; 1974 Miami, Florida, U.S.
- Died: January 23, 2021 (aged 46)
- Party: Republican
- Spouse: Eliot Pedrosa
- Children: 2
- Education: Florida International University (B.A.); New England Law (J.D.)

Nilda Pedrosa (1974 – January 23, 2021) was an American politician in the Republican party and the acting Under Secretary of State for Public Diplomacy and Public Affairs of the United States Department of State, from September 28, 2020, until a few days before her death in January 2021. She was formerly a policy advocate and the Assistant Dean for Development & External Affairs at Florida International University College of Law.

== Early life ==
Nilda Rodriguez Pedrosa was born at Mercy Hospital and raised in Miami, Florida. She graduated from Our Lady of Lourdes Academy in 1992. She went on to study at Miami Dade College and Florida International University (FIU), obtaining a bachelor's degree in sociology and anthropology in 1996. Subsequently, she attended New England Law Boston, earning a Juris Doctor with honors in 1999.

== Career ==
=== Federal government (2001–2010) ===
Pedrosa served as a regional director for former Republican senator Connie Mack III. In 2001, she was appointed public policy and government relations director at Miami Children's Hospital. During the Bush administration, Pedrosa was appointed as the Director of the Office of Intergovernmental Affairs at the U.S. Department of State in 2003, after serving as Acting Director. She remained as Director until April 2004.

In the run up to the 2004 elections, she served as Political Director for Mel Martinez's successful Senate campaign. Between 2005 and 2008, she served as Senior Policy Advisor to former Florida U.S. Senator Martinez. From 2009 to 2010, she served as chief of staff to Congressman Mario Díaz-Balart of Florida.

Pedrosa was the leading member of Martinez's staff on immigration issues, and spearheaded his efforts to obtain passage of comprehensive immigration reform in the United States Senate in 2006 and 2007. To that end, she spoke at various forums on the issue, including the National Council of La Raza and the Greater Miami Chamber of Commerce. She was also a prominent member of the Cuban-American lobby and was an active member of Cuba Democracy Advocates. She was one of the staff members responsible for working on Cuba policy issues in both the US Senate and the US House of Representatives.

=== Florida Judicial Nominating Committee ===
Pedrosa was a member of the Eleventh Judicial Circuit Court of Florida Nominating Commission, as an appointee of former Governor Jeb Bush in July 2001. She was elected as its chair in November 2005. She went on to sit on the Florida Third District Court of Appeal Nominating Commission, as an appointee of former Governor Charlie Crist.

Pedrosa was appointed by Governor Rick Scott to serve as a member of the Florida Supreme Court Nominating Commission in December 2012.

=== Later career ===
After her stint working in the federal government came to an end, Pedrosa served as the Assistant Dean for Development and External Affairs at the Florida International University College of Law, starting in 2010. She proceeded to become a policy adviser for Jeb Bush during his 2016 presidential campaign, before acting as chief of staff to Pam Bondi, the Florida Attorney General at the time.

=== Undersecretary of State (2020–2021) ===
Pedrosa was named acting Under Secretary of State for Public Diplomacy and Public Affairs by Secretary of State Mike Pompeo on September 28, 2020. She was the second Hispanic person to be Under Secretary. When the Trump presidency came to an end in January 2021, she was the highest-ranking woman at the State Department. On January 20, 2021, the position of Under Secretary of State for Public Diplomacy and Public Affairs was passed to Jennifer Hall Godfrey under delegation of authority.

== Community involvement ==
Pedrosa was a leading member of the Miami Chapter of the Federalist Society. She was also involved with the Greater Miami Chamber of Commerce and the Florida Immigrant Advocacy Center (now known as the Americans for Immigrant Justice).

Pedrosa was a member of the board of Amigos For Kids and the board of the 11th Judicial Circuit Historical Society

== Personal life ==
Pedrosa was married to Eliot Pedrosa, whom she met in the constitutional law course they were both taking at FIU. Together, they had two children.

Pedrosa died on the night of January 23, 2021. She was 46, and was ill with cancer in the time leading up to her death.

== See also ==
- Comprehensive Immigration Reform Act of 2006
- Comprehensive Immigration Reform Act of 2007
- Cuba-United States relations
- Diaspora politics in the United States
- Opposition to Fidel Castro
