= Elwyn Thomas =

American judge

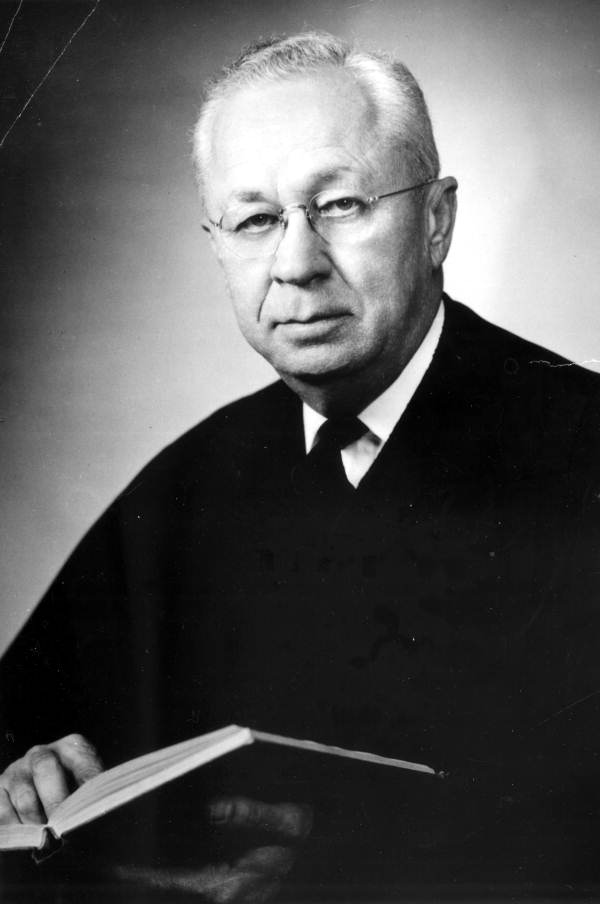
- Thomas in 1964

Chief Justice of the Florida Supreme Court
- In office 1959–1961

Justice of the Florida Supreme Court
- In office 1938–1969

Personal details
- Born: July 5, 1894 Eldred, Florida, U.S.
- Died: February 15, 1971 (aged 76)

Elwyn Thomas (July 5, 1894 – February 15, 1971) was a Florida judge, and a justice of the Supreme Court of Florida from 1938 to 1969.

== Early life ==
Elwyn Thomas was born in Eldred, Florida, a small community in St. Lucie County, Florida named after his mother's family, on July 5, 1894, to Hal S. Thomas and Julia E. Thomas. He attended Stetson University College of Law in DeLand, Florida where he received his LL.B degree in 1915.

== Career ==
He was admitted to law practice in Florida the same year. He began his practice in DeLand and later moved to Fort Pierce. In 1917, he became the prosecuting attorney for St. Lucie County, Florida. Two years later, he served as the City Attorney for both Vero Beach (1919–1923) and Fort Pierce (1919–1925). On June 14, 1924, he married Eva Banes. In 1925, he became the 21st Circuit Court Judge for St. Lucie County, a position he held for ten years.

From 1935 to 1936, he was the president of the Fort Pierce/St. Lucie County Chamber of Commerce. From 1935 to 1938, he also served as Senior Judge of the 9th Judicial Circuit. In 1938, he was appointed to the Florida Supreme Court as an associate justice and he served on Florida's high court for 31 years until 1969. From 1947 to 1949 and from 1959 to 1961, he served as chief justice of the Florida Supreme Court. Stetson University awarded him an Honorary Doctor of Laws degree in 1951.

Justice Thomas was instrumental in creation of the Florida District Courts of Appeal, lobbying for their establishment in 1957.

== Organizations/affiliations ==
Florida Bar Association
Freemasonry
past Master of Ft. Pierce Lodge No. 87
Phi Alpha Delta Law Fraternity
Member, David Brewer Chapter, since April 2, 1915
District Justice, 1954
Supreme Vice Justice, 1954-1956
Supreme Justice, 1956-1958
Chair, Supreme Advisory Board, 1958-1960
Rotary Club of Tallahassee
Sigma Nu fraternity
Vero Beach Yacht Club
charter member, 1926
