= Barrow v. Barrow =

Florida Court of Appeal decision

Barrow v. Barrow, 527 So. 2d 1373 (Fla. 1st DCA 1988) is a landmark decision by the Florida First District Court of Appeal that addresses the application of constructive trusts as an equitable remedy in probate disputes. The court's ruling clarified that the existence of a probated will does not preclude the imposition of equitable remedies such as a constructive trust to rectify wrongful conduct affecting estate assets.

This decision has been influential in Florida probate law, reinforcing the principle that probate proceedings do not bar courts from applying equitable doctrines to ensure fairness and justice. Barrow v. Barrow is frequently cited for its guidance on balancing probate formalities with equitable relief, particularly in cases involving allegations of fraud or undue influence in the disposition of estate property.

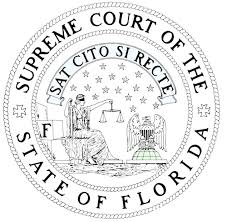
Supreme Court of the State of Florida Seal

== Background ==
The case arose from a contested probate matter where the plaintiffs alleged that property transferred through a will was acquired through fraud and undue influence, raising questions about the proper legal remedy to prevent unjust enrichment.

The dispute arose between siblings following the death of their father. One sibling, the appellee, received a piece of real estate through the father’s will, which had already been admitted to probate. Other family members alleged that the appellee had procured the will's favorable terms through fraudulent conduct and undue influence during the father’s declining health. They claimed the will did not reflect the father’s true testamentary intent.

Rather than challenge the will in probate court, the plaintiffs brought a civil action seeking to impose a constructive trust on the property, arguing that the appellee would be unjustly enriched if allowed to retain the land under the will's terms.

== Facts ==
The plaintiffs were siblings of the appellee, who inherited real property through their father’s will. They contended that the appellee manipulated their father and exerted undue influence, resulting in a will that disproportionately benefited him. After probate concluded and the appellee took title to the property, the plaintiffs filed an equitable claim in the circuit court, seeking to impose a constructive trust to recover what they viewed as wrongfully obtained property.

The appellee moved to dismiss the case, arguing that since the will had already been probated, the plaintiffs could not challenge the property distribution through an independent equitable action.

== Procedural history ==
The circuit court ruled in favor of the appellee, dismissing the plaintiffs' claim for a constructive trust. The trial court held that the plaintiffs were effectively attempting to circumvent the probate process and that equity could not override the formal validity of a probated will.

The plaintiffs appealed to the Florida First District Court of Appeal, arguing that probate finality did not shield fraudulently obtained property from equitable remedies. The appellate court reviewed the appeal and reversed the trial court’s decision.

== Issue ==
The legal issue before the appellate court was whether a Florida court may impose a constructive trust on property transferred by a will that has already been probated, if the property was obtained through fraud or undue influence.

This raised broader questions about the interaction between formal probate law and equitable doctrines designed to prevent unjust enrichment.

== Decision ==
The Florida First District Court of Appeal reversed the trial court and held that probate proceedings do not preclude a court from imposing a constructive trust when there is evidence that the property was acquired through wrongful conduct.

The court explained that a constructive trust is an equitable remedy used to prevent unjust enrichment and is not dependent on the invalidation of a will. Even though the will had been validly probated, if the bequest was obtained by fraud or undue influence, a court of equity could intervene to rectify the injustice.

"The doctrine of constructive trusts is not barred by the probate of the will when the circumstances under which a devisee acquires property make it inequitable for him to retain it." — Barrow, 527 So. 2d at 1375.

== Significance ==
Barrow v. Barrow clarified that Florida courts have authority to impose equitable remedies such as constructive trusts even after probate proceedings have concluded, especially in cases involving fraud, undue influence, or other inequitable conduct. The case reaffirmed that equity acts to prevent unjust enrichment and does not depend on the invalidation of a will through probate procedures.

It has since been cited in numerous Florida cases and legal commentaries as precedent for allowing equitable intervention in probate matters, particularly when formal legal remedies are insufficient to achieve fairness.
