= Kenneth B. Bell =

American judge

Kenneth Bell
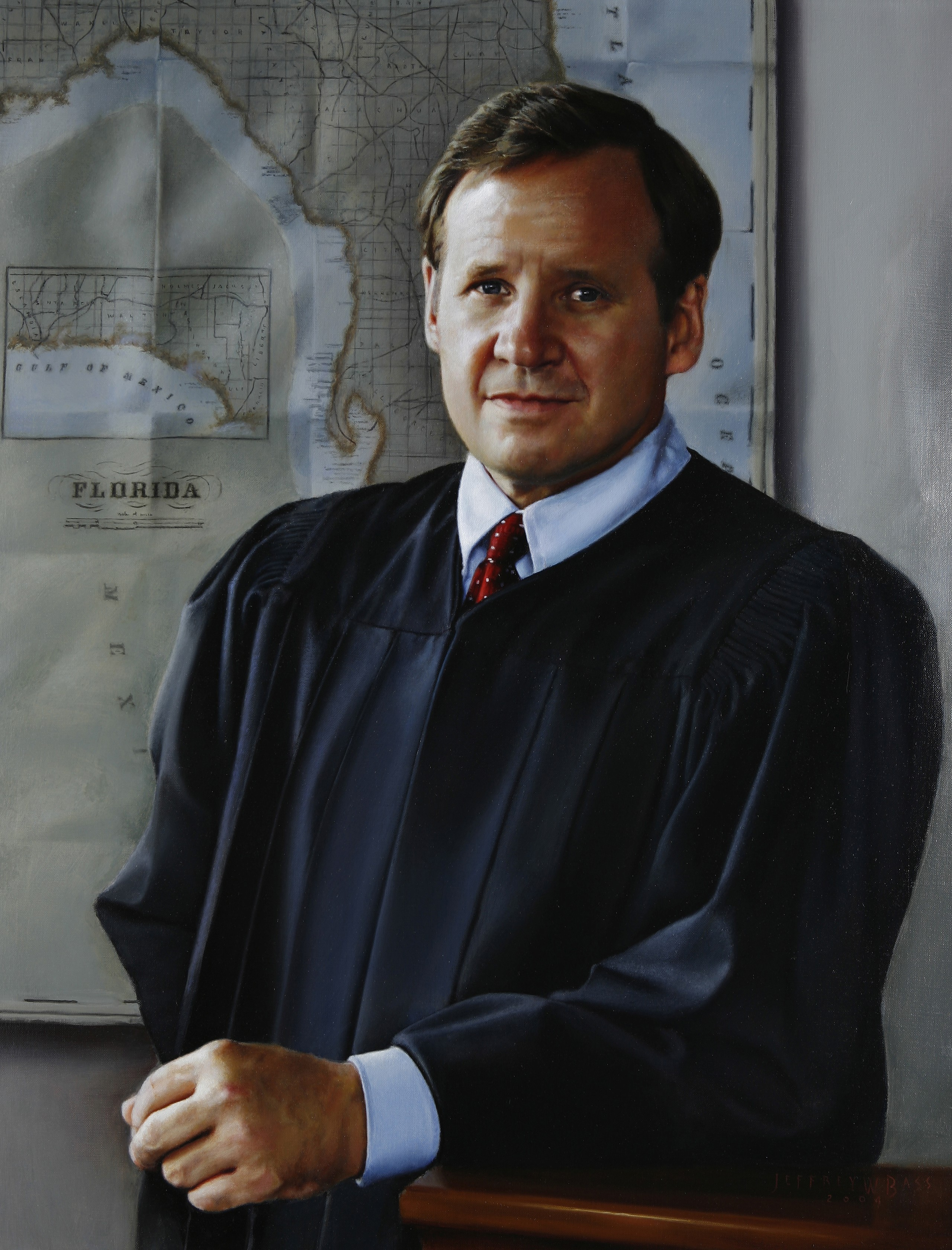

Justice for the Florida Supreme Court
- In office January 7, 2003 – October 1, 2008
- Appointed by: Jeb Bush

Personal details
- Born: Kenneth Bradley Bell; April 20, 1956 (age 70)
- Education: Florida State University (JD); Davidson College (BA)

Kenneth Bradley Bell (born April 20, 1956) is a former Associate Justice of the Florida Supreme Court.

== Education ==
Bell attended Davidson College in Davidson, North Carolina as an undergraduate, and received his Juris Doctor from the Florida State University College of Law in 1982.

== Career ==
Commencing from 1982 and for nearly a decade, Bell labored in private-practice and specialized in the field of real estate law. He became board certified in real estate law in 1989 and was confirmed by the Florida Bar in January 1991. In the same year, he became the youngest circuit judge in the history of the First Judicial Circuit of Florida. For the next 12 years Bell served on the bench and in other capacities within the community, and was consequently appointed to the Florida Supreme Court by Former Governor Bush in December 2002, took office January 2003, and labored forward with distinction as the first Justice to be returned from the Pensacola area in a century.

He resigned from the bench effective October 1, 2008, and upon accepting his resignation, Governor Charlie Crist honored him with the following:

"Your contributions to Florida law and the judicial system will stand for many years to come. You never wavered in following the text of our Constitution and statutes, and by doing so you set an example of judicial restraint for jurists everywhere. As a man of humility and deep faith in God, you have served as a role model of personal and professional integrity on the bench."

== Resignation & Private Practice ==
On May 23, 2008, Bell announced that he would resign from the supreme court on October 1, 2008, which he hoped would allow the "constitutional mechanism" enough time to find a suitable replacement. "Serving the people of Florida as a justice," Bell wrote, "has been the greatest privilege of my public life. Indeed, I wish I could continue to serve. However, similar to the reasons recently expressed by Justice Raoul Cantero in his resignation, my family responsibilities require that I return full-time to Pensacola."

In addition to this, he also expressed a desire to help his community, which has suffered the effects of Hurricane Ivan. He was succeeded by Justice Ricky Polston.

Bell returned to the practice of law on October 1, 2008, as a partner with the Pensacola, Florida office of the regional law firm, Clark, Partington, Hart, Larry, Bond & Stackhouse. However, in June 2014, Bell left Clark, Partington, Hart, Larry, Bond & Stackhouse and became a shareholder with the Gunster, a law firm based out of South Florida. Kenneth B. Bell.

He now lives in Pensacola with his family.
