= Florida Second District Court of Appeal =

American court

Map of the 6 Florida district courts of appeal.

The Florida Second District Court of Appeal is currently headquartered at the new Pinellas courthouse in St. Petersburg.

It was originally based in Lakeland until the creation of the Florida Sixth District Court of Appeal in January 2023, after which it heard cases in Tampa on the campus of Stetson University College of Law in the interim until the new building was completed in February 2026.

There are nine counties in the Second District, which includes a population of over 5.0 million people. The Second District covers Pasco and Pinellas (6th judicial circuit); Hardee, Highlands, and Polk (10th judicial circuit); DeSoto, Manatee, and Sarasota (12th judicial circuit); and Hillsborough (13th judicial circuit). The counties of Charlotte, Glades, Collier, Hendry, and Lee (20th judicial circuit) became part of the new Florida Sixth District Court of Appeal in January, 2023.

Boundaries of the five district courts of appeal that existed from 1979 to 2023.

== History ==
The initial territorial jurisdiction of the Second District, with its headquarters in Lakeland, encompassed twenty-eight counties, ranging from Lake County in the north, to Collier County and Broward County in the south.

In 1965, the Fourth District was established, reducing the Second District's territory, which was further reduced by the establishment of the Fifth District in 1979. There are now fourteen counties in the Second District.

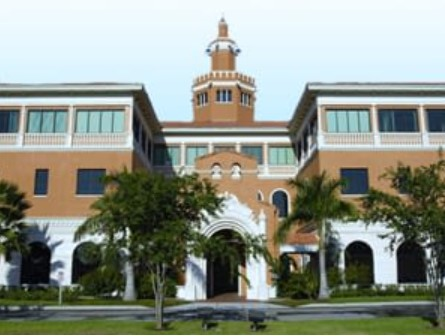
Temporary location of the Florida Second District Court of Appeal

When the District Court of an Appeal for the Second District first convened, its headquarters were in the old Florida Citrus Commission building in Lakeland. In 1980 a branch headquarters for the Second District was authorized and in that same year was established in Tampa where the court maintains an additional courtroom and where eight of the court's judges now have their chambers. The chambers of six judges, the clerk's office, the marshal's office, and the court records are located in the court's Lakeland headquarters. The court hears oral arguments in both its Lakeland and Tampa courtrooms. Periodically, the court also hears oral arguments in county courthouses in various counties within the district.

Originally there were three judges in the Second District. There are now 14 judges on the court.

== Active judges ==
Name	Start	Chief Term	Term Expires	Appointer
Robert Morris	August 1, 2009	2021–present	2029	Charlie Crist (R)
Stevan Northcutt	January 6, 1997	2007–2009	2029	Lawton Chiles (D)
Morris Silberman	January 2, 2001	2011–2013	2027	Jeb Bush (R)
Patricia Kelly	December 3, 2001	—	2029	Jeb Bush (R)
Craig Villanti	February 3, 2003	2015–2017	2029	Jeb Bush (R)
Edward LaRose	February 1, 2005	2017–2019	2031	Jeb Bush (R)
Nelly Khouzam	August 1, 2008	2019–2021	2029	Charlie Crist (R)
Anthony Black	April 1, 2010	—	2031	Charlie Crist (R)
Daniel Sleet	December 21, 2012	—	2027	Rick Scott (R)
Matthew Lucas	December 23, 2014	—	2029	Rick Scott (R)
Susan Rothstein-Youakim	May 2, 2016	—	2031	Rick Scott (R)
Andrew Atkinson	January 19, 2018	—	2027	Rick Scott (R)
Andrea Teves Smith	February 1, 2019	—	2027	Ron DeSantis (R)
Suzanne Labrit	July 29, 2020	—	2029	Ron DeSantis (R)
John Guard	January 14, 2026	—	2027	Ron DeSantis (R)

== Chief Judges ==
Judges who have served as Chief Judge of the Second DCA include but are not limited to:

- Abram Otto Kanner (1957–?)
- George T. Shannon
- William P. Allen
- David F. Patterson (2000–2001)
- Morris Silberman
- Nelly Khouzam (July 1)

== Past Judges ==
Judges who have served on the Second DCA include:

- Charles T. Canady
- David F. Patterson
- John Scheb
- John Badalamenti

== See also ==
- Florida District Courts of Appeal (for history and general overview)
- Florida First District Court of Appeal
- Florida Third District Court of Appeal
- Florida Fourth District Court of Appeal
- Florida Fifth District Court of Appeal
- Florida Sixth District Court of Appeal
