= Florida Fourth District Court of Appeal =

Regional appellate court in West Palm Beach

Map of the 6 Florida district courts of appeal.

The Florida Fourth District Court of Appeal is headquartered in West Palm Beach, Florida. Its twelve judges have jurisdiction over cases arising in Palm Beach County, Broward County, St. Lucie County, Martin County, Indian River County, and Okeechobee County.

== History ==
The Fourth District Court of Appeal was created in 1965, and located in Vero Beach. In 1967, the Legislature relocated the Fourth District to West Palm Beach, and the Court moved to its permanent site on Palm Beach Lakes Boulevard in 1970.

== Active judges ==
Name	Start	Chief Term	Term Expires	Appointer
Spencer Levine, Chief Judge	2009	July 1, 2019 – present	2029	Charlie Crist (R)
Shannon Shaw	2025	–	2027	Ron DeSantis (R)
Robert Gross	1995	December 1, 2008 – June 30, 2011	2029	Lawton Chiles (D)
Melanie May	2002	July 1, 2011 – June 30, 2013	2029	Jeb Bush (R)
Caroline Shepherd	2025	–	2027	Ron DeSantis (R)
Cory Ciklin	2008	July 1, 2015 – June 30, 2017	2029	Charlie Crist (R)
Jonathan Gerber	2009	July 1, 2017 – June 30, 2019	2029	Charlie Crist (R)
Burton Conner	2011	–	2031	Rick Scott (R)
Alan Forst	2013	–	2027	Rick Scott (R)
Mark Klingensmith	2013	–	2027	Rick Scott (R)
Jeffrey Kuntz	2016	–	2031	Rick Scott (R)
Jonathan Lott	2025	–	2029	Ron DeSantis (R)

== Former judges ==
Charles O. Andrews Jr.	1965–1967
Sherman N. Smith Jr.	1965–1967
James H. Walden	1965–1976 \ 1982–1990
Spencer C. Cross	1967–1979
David L. McCain	1967–1970
John L. Reed Jr.	1967–1973
William C. Owen Jr.	1967–1976
Gerald Mager	1970–1977
James C. Downey	1973–1992
James E. Alderman	1976–1978
Harry Lee Anstead	1977–1994
James C. Dauksch	1977–1979
Gavin K. Letts	1977–1993
John H. Moore II	1977–1981
John R. Beranek	1978–1984
George W. Hersey	1979–1995
Hugh S. Glickstein	1979–1998
Daniel T. K. Hurley	1979–1986
John W. Dell	1981–2001
Rosemary Barkett	1984–1985
Bobby W. Gunther	1986–2007
Barry J. Stone	1986–2008
Mark E. Polen	1989–2013
Eugene Garrett	1989–1993
Gary M. Farmer	1991–2010
Larry A. Klein	1993–2009
Barbara Pariente	1993–1997
W. Matthew Stevenson	1993–2016
George A. Shahood	1995–2009
Fred A. Hazouri	1998–2013
Carol Y. Taylor	1998–2020
Jorge Labarga	2008

== Judicial Nominating Commission ==
List of members on the Fourth District Court of Appeal Judicial Nominating Commission:

- Debra Jenks, Chair (term expiring 2024)
- Alexis M. Yarbrough, Vice Chair (term expiring 2024)
- Rian Jensine Balfour (term expiring 2022)
- David Keller (term expiring 2022)
- Mark Miller (term expiring 2022)
- Paul Lopez (term expiring 2022)
- Susan H. Aprill (term expiring 2023)
- Robert Allen (term expiring 2023)
- Eric Yesner (term expiring 2024)

== See also ==
- Florida District Courts of Appeal (for history and general overview)
- Florida First District Court of Appeal
- Florida Second District Court of Appeal
- Florida Third District Court of Appeal
- Florida Fifth District Court of Appeal
- Florida Sixth District Court of Appeal
