= Raoul G. Cantero III =

American judge (born 1960)

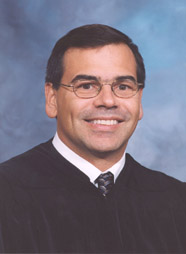
- Born: August 1, 1960 (age 66); Madrid, Spain
- Education: Florida State University (BA); Harvard University (JD)
- Spouse: Ana Maria Perdomo

Raoul G. Cantero III (born Raoul Roberto Garcia-Cantero y Batista; August 1, 1960) is a Spanish-born American lawyer and a former justice of the Florida Supreme Court.

== Life and career ==
Born in Madrid, Spain, Cantero graduated from Florida State University as an undergraduate and from Harvard Law School. He was also a Fulbright Scholar. Prior to his appointment to the Florida Supreme Court, he was a shareholder in the Miami firm of Adorno & Yoss.

On July 10, 2002, Governor Jeb Bush appointed Cantero to the Florida Supreme Court. Cantero had not previously served as a judge, although he had extensive experience as an appellate attorney. Cantero is regarded as the first Florida Supreme Court Justice of Hispanic descent, contrasting with Rosemary Barkett who was the first Justice to meet the Census criteria for being Hispanic due to her birth in Mexico to Syrian parents and the fact that her first language was Spanish.

During the George W. Bush presidency he was mentioned as a potential Supreme Court nominee.

On April 11, 2008, Cantero announced he would resign from the Florida Supreme Court, due to his family's desire to return to Miami, their hometown. His last day on the court was September 6, 2008. He had announced his intention to thereafter join leading international law firm White & Case LLP as a partner in the Miami office and head of the Miami Appellate Practice group.

== Family ==
His father is Raoul Garcia-Cantero y Parajon (b. 1935) and his mother is Elisa Aleida Batista y Godinez (b. 1933). He married Ana Maria Perdomo (b. 1963) on June 17, 1983 and they have three children. He attended the Sisters of St. Joseph-run St. Theresa School in Coral Gables, Florida and later graduated high School from the Marist-Brothers-run Christopher Columbus High School (Miami, Florida) in Miami. His maternal grandfather was former Cuban dictator Fulgencio Batista.

== See also ==
- List of Hispanic and Latino American jurists

Legal offices
Preceded by Major B. Harding	Associate Justice of the Florida Supreme Court; 2002–2008	Succeeded by Charles Canady
