= Stewart v. Preston =

Stewart v. Preston 1 Fla. 1 (1846) was the first Florida Supreme Court decision recorded in the official Florida reports.

== Ruling ==
In the case the Florida Supreme Court ruled that the General Assembly had the power to require "that all cases now pending in said Court of Appeals, shall be transferred to said Supreme Court, and tried and decided therein and thereby, except cases cognizable by the Federal Courts". Furthermore "[a]n appeal suspends the judgment until some Superior Tribunal makes a rightful disposition of the case", and "[t]he laws of the United States, do not provide for the transfer by appeal or Writ of Error of a judgment rendered by the Superior Court of a Territory, to a District or Circuit Court, or to the Supreme Court of the United States".
