= Florida Third District Court of Appeal =

State court in Florida, US

Map of the 6 Florida district courts of appeal.

The Florida Third District Court of Appeal is headquartered in Miami, Florida. Its ten judges have jurisdiction over cases arising from Miami-Dade and Monroe Counties.

== History ==
The Third District Court of Appeal (DCA) was one of the first three DCAs created by the Florida legislature in 1957. Court was first held in a room of the University of Miami School of Law. Then, from 1960 to 1976, court sessions took place at the State Office Building. It wasn't until 1976 that the court finally had its own facility to conduct its business. This courthouse was dedicated by Governor Reubin Askew in the fall of 1976. In 1990 an addition was added to keep pace with the court's continued growth. The courthouse has won the recognition of the American Institute of Architects (South Florida Chapter) and in 1981 Governor Bob Graham gave the court the Governor's Design Award.

The court's original three judges (Charles A. Carroll, Mallory H. Horton and Tillman Pearson) have increased to ten as of 2010.

Florida Third DCA building

== Chief Judges ==
Judges who have served as Chief Judge of the Third DCA include:

- Edwin Scales, July 1, 2025-present
- Thomas Logue, July 1, 2023-June 30, 2025
- Ivan F. Fernandez, July 1, 2021-June 30, 2023
- Kevin Emas, January 10, 2019 to June 30, 2021
- Barbara Lagoa, January 1, 2019 to January 8, 2019
- Leslie B. Rothenberg, July 1, 2017 to December 30, 2018
- Richard Suarez, July 9, 2015 to June 30, 2017
- Frank A. Shepherd, July 1, 2013 to July 8, 2015
- Linda Ann Wells, July 1, 2011 to June 30, 2013
- David M. Gersten, July 1, 2007, until June 30, 2009
- Gerald B. Cope, Jr., July 1, 2005 to June 30, 2007
- Alan R. Schwartz, 1983 to 2004
- Phillip A. Hubbart, 1980 to 1983
- Robert M. Haverfield, 1978 to 1980
- Norman Hendry, 1965 to 1967 and 1977
- Thomas H. Barkdull, Jr., 1963 to 1965 and 1967 to 1976
- Tillman Pearson, 1961 to 1963
- Mallory H. Horton, 1959 to 1961
- Charles A. Carroll, 1957 to 1959

== Active judges ==
Judges serving on the Third DCA as of July 1, 2017 include:

Name	Start	Appointer Ron DeSantis
2010	Charlie Crist (R)	
Alexander Bokor	2020	Charlie Crist (R)
Ivan Fernandez	2011	Rick Scott (R)
Thomas Logue	2012	Rick Scott (R)
Edwin Scales	2013	Rick Scott (R)
Norma Lindsey	2017	Rick Scott (R)
Bronwyn Miller	2018	Rick Scott (R)
Kansas Gooden	2024	Rick Scott (R)
Monica Gordo	2019	Ron DeSantis (R)
Fleur Lobree	2019	Ron DeSantis (R)

== Retired Judges ==
Judges who have served on the Third DCA include:

Name	Tenure	Comments
Charles A. Carroll	(1957–1974)	
Mallory H. Horton	(1957–1965)	
Tillman Pearson	(1957–1980)	
Thomas H. Barkdull, Jr.	(1961–1996)	
Norman Hendry	(1961–1988)	
Richard H.M. Swann	(1965–1972)	
Robert M. Haverfield	(1972–1980)	
Raymond G. Nathan	(1974–1978)	
Phillip A. Hubbart	(1977–1996 )	
James W. Kehoe	(1977–1979)	
Alan R. Schwartz	(1978–2004)	
Joseph Nesbitt	(1979–1999)	
Natalie Baskin	(1980–1996)	
Daniel S. Pearson	(1980–1989)	
Wilkie D. Ferguson, Jr.	(1980–1993)	
James R. Jorgenson	(1981–2003)	
David L. Levy	(1989–2006)	
Mario P. Goderich	(1990–2005)	
Melvia B. Green	(1994–2008)	
John G. Fletcher	(1996–2007)	
Robert Shevin	(1996–2005)	
Rodolfo Sorondo, Jr.	(1997–2002)	
Gerald B. Cope, Jr.	(1988–2010)	
David M. Gersten	(1989–2011)	
Linda Ann Wells	(2003–2017)	
Frank A. Shepherd	(2003–2017)	
Leslie B. Rothenberg	(2005–2018)	
Richard Suarez	(2005–2018)	

== The Florida Third District Court of Appeal Nominating Commission ==
- Marcos D. Jimenez, Chair (2011)
- Jeffrey S. Bass (2014)
- Hector J. Lombana (2014)
- Peter Prieto (2014)
- Matias R. Dorta (2011)
- Timothy J. Koenig (2011)
- Nilda Pedrosa (2012)
- Lauri Waldman Ross (2012)
- Lilly Ann Sanchez (2012)

== Notable cases ==
- In re Gill (2010) (Cope, J.) Text of the Court of Appeal decision: This ruling struck down the Florida's statutory ban on gay and lesbian people adopting children in the state.
- Engle v. Liggett Group (2003) (Gersten, J.) Text of the Court of Appeal decision: This ruling was overturned in 2006 by the Florida Supreme Court which ordered decertification of a class action lawsuit against big tobacco companies that effectively reversed the largest punitive damage jury award, $145 billion, in U.S. history.

== See also ==
- Florida District Courts of Appeal (for history and general overview)
- Florida First District Court of Appeal
- Florida Second District Court of Appeal
- Florida Fourth District Court of Appeal
- Florida Fifth District Court of Appeal
- Florida Sixth District Court of Appeal
