= Florida Fifth District Court of Appeal =

Regional court of appeal in Florida, U.S.

Map of the 6 Florida district courts of appeal.

The Florida Fifth District Court of Appeal is headquartered in Daytona Beach, Florida.

Boundaries of the five district courts of appeal that existed from 1979 to 2023.

== History ==
The Fifth District Court of Appeal was created by the 1979 session of the Florida Legislature. The addition of the Florida Sixth District Court of Appeal in 2023 changed the caseload of the Fifth DCA.

Previously, the Fifth DCA handled cases from the following counties and circuit courts: Lake, Marion, Sumter, Citrus & Hernando (Fifth Circuit); Volusia, Flagler, Putnam & St. Johns (Seventh Circuit); Orange & Osceola (Ninth Circuit); and Brevard & Seminole (18th Circuit). The Ninth Circuit was reassigned to the Sixth DCA and the Fourth Circuit (Clay, Duval & Nassau) was added from the First DCA.

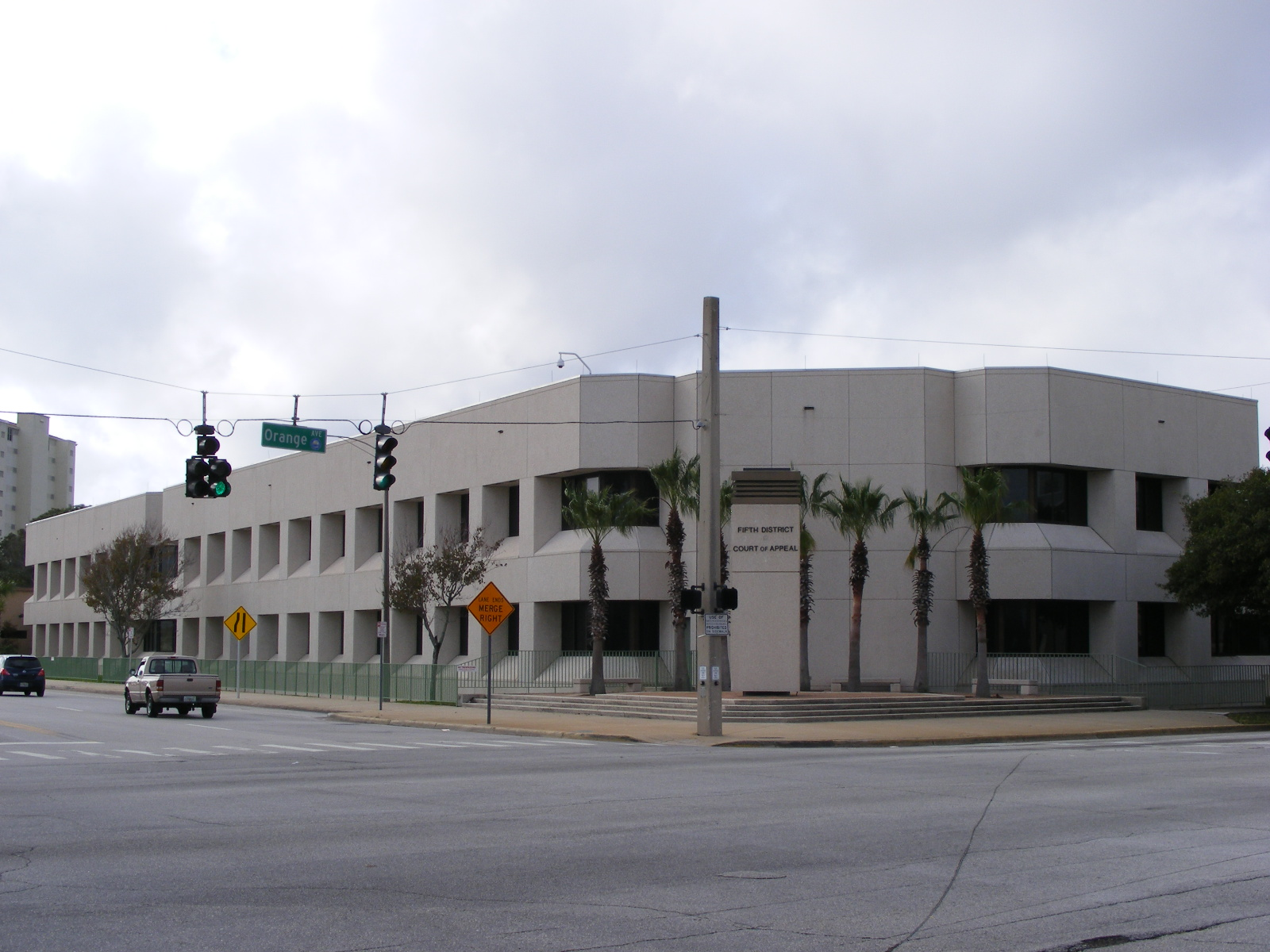
The Florida Fifth District Court of Appeal building, pictured in 2008.

== Chief Judges ==
Judges who have served as Chief Judge of the Fifth DCA include:

- Thomas D. Sawaya (2003–2005)
- Robert J. Pleus Jr. (2005–2007)
- David A. Monaco (2009–2011)
- Richard B. Orfinger (2011–2013)
- Jay P. Cohen (2017–2018)
- Kerry I. Evander (2019-2021)

== Active judges ==
Judges who are currently serving on the Fifth DCA include:

Name	Start	Appointer
Brian Lambert, Chief Judge	2014	Rick Scott (R)
Rand Wallis	2013	Rick Scott (R)
James Edwards	2014	Rick Scott (R)
Eric Eisnaugle	2017	Rick Scott (R)
John Harris	2018	Rick Scott (R)
Scott Makar	January 1, 2023	Ron DeSantis (R)
Harvey Jay	January 1, 2023	Ron DeSantis (R)
Adrian Soud	January 1, 2023	Ron DeSantis (R)
Joe Boatwright	January 1, 2023	Ron DeSantis (R)
Paige Kilbane	January 1, 2023	Ron DeSantis (R)
John MacIver	January 1, 2023	Ron DeSantis (R)
Jordan Pratt	April 1, 2023	Ron DeSantis (R)

== Senior judges ==
Senior judges are appointed to temporary judicial duty. Judges who are on senior status at the Fifth DCA include:

- Richard B. Orfinger
- Emerson R. Thompson Jr.
- Bruce W. Jacobus
- Thomas D. Sawaya

== See also ==
- Florida District Courts of Appeal (for history and general overview)
- Florida First District Court of Appeal
- Florida Second District Court of Appeal
- Florida Third District Court of Appeal
- Florida Fourth District Court of Appeal
- Florida Sixth District Court of Appeal
