= Jorge Labarga =

American judge (born 1952)

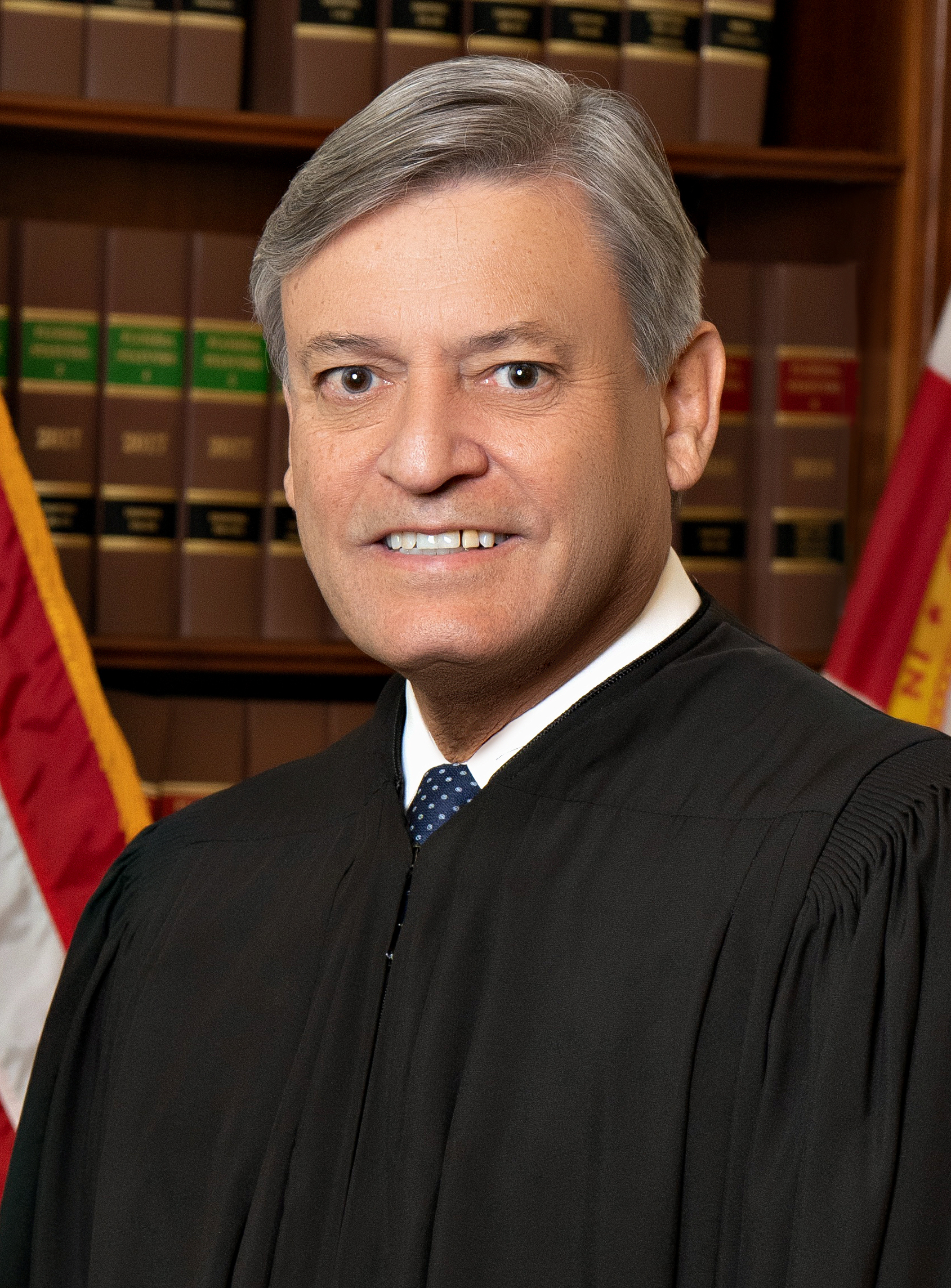

Chief Justice of the Florida Supreme Court
- In office July 1, 2014 – June 30, 2018
- Preceded by: Ricky Polston
- Succeeded by: Charles T. Canady

Justice of the Florida Supreme Court
- Incumbent
- Assumed office January 6, 2009
- Appointed by: Charlie Crist
- Preceded by: Harry Lee Anstead

Personal details
- Born: October 21, 1952 (age 73) Havana, Cuba
- Education: University of Florida (BA, JD)
- Website: Court website

Jorge Labarga (born October 21, 1952) is a justice of the Florida Supreme Court, taking office on January 6, 2009. On June 30, 2014, he was sworn in as Florida's 56th Chief Justice and the first Cuban-American to hold the post. He was succeeded on July 1, 2018, by Charles T. Canady.

== Biography ==
Labarga was born in Havana, Cuba in 1952 to Miriam and Jorge Labarga Sr. He grew up and graduated high school in Pahokee, Florida the heavily agricultural Lake Okeechobee region of western Palm Beach County. He graduated from Forest Hill High School, West Palm Beach in 1972 and received his Bachelor of Arts in political science from the University of Florida, Gainesville in 1976. He received his Juris Doctor from University of Florida School of Law in 1979. After law school he became an assistant public defender. In 1982, he joined the state attorney's office. From 1987 to 1992, he joined the law firm of Cone, Wagner, Nugent, Roth, Romano & Ericksen, P.A. In 1992, he was a founding partner with the law firm of Roth, Duncan & Labarga, P.A. In 1996, Governor Lawton Chiles appointed him a circuit court judge.

== Judicial career ==
From 1996 to 2009, he served as a judge for the 15th Circuit Court in Palm Beach County, Florida. He is notable as the non-partisan judge who refused a new county-only vote during the 2000 U.S. Presidential election on the grounds that the Constitution stated that an election must be held everywhere in the United States on the same day, not just in one area.

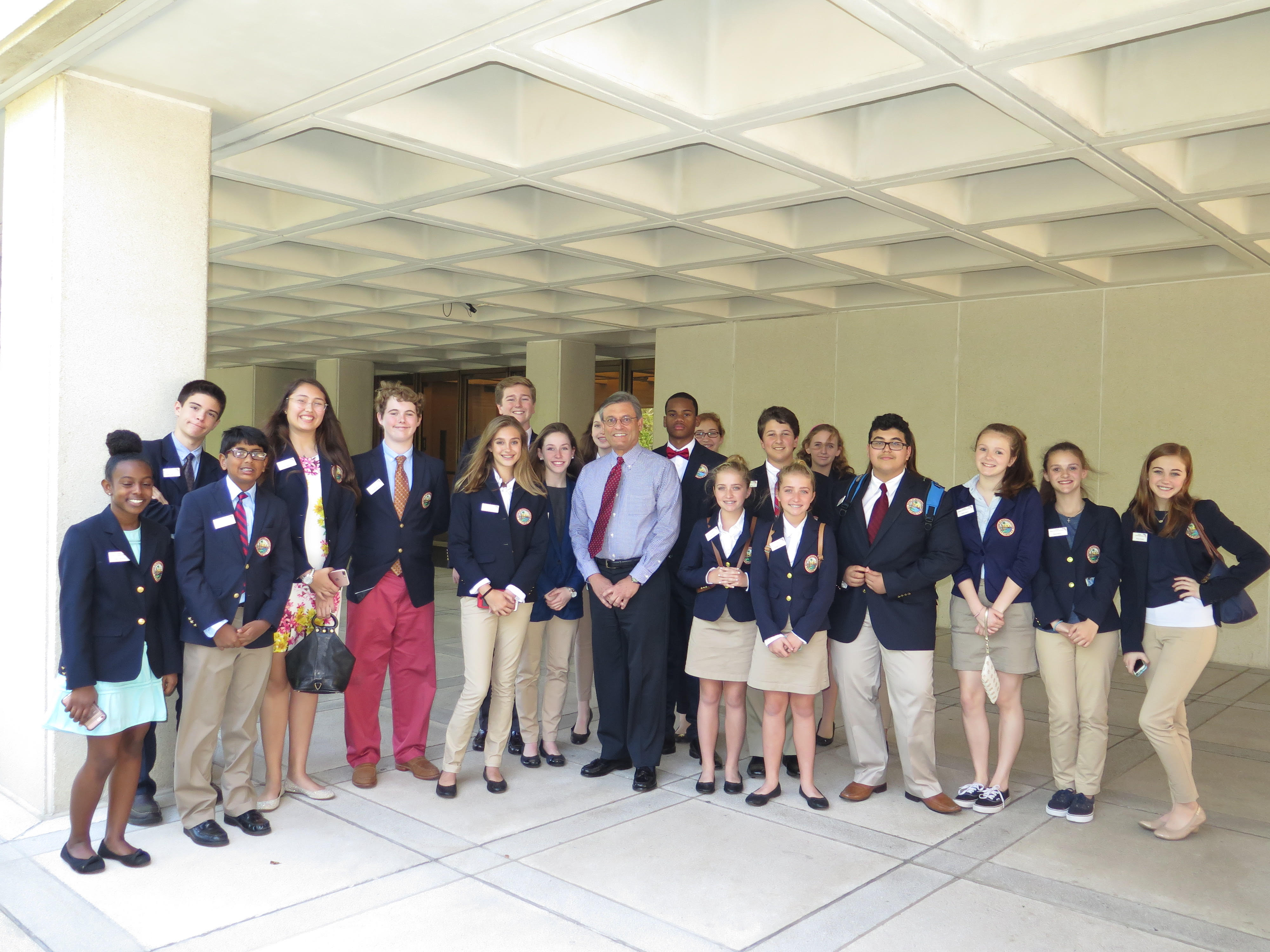
Labarga with Florida House of Representatives pages in March 2017

Prior to his Florida Supreme Court appointment, Labarga had been appointed by Governor Charlie Crist to the Fourth District Court of Appeal for Florida, an intermediate appellate court based in West Palm Beach, Florida. He served in that position only a single day, January 5, 2009. His term on that court was cut short when Governor Crist quickly elevated Labarga to the Florida Supreme Court to replace retiring Justice Harry Lee Anstead. On June 30, 2014, Labarga was sworn in as the 56th Chief Justice of the Supreme Court of Florida, replacing former Chief Justice Ricky Polston. Labarga is the first person of Hispanic descent to lead the state of Florida's judicial branch.

== Personal life ==
Labarga is married to Zulma R. Labarga, and they have two daughters.

In 2022, Labarga was named by Carnegie Corporation of New York as an honoree of the Great Immigrants Awards.

== See also ==
- List of Hispanic and Latino American jurists

Legal offices
Preceded by Harry Lee Anstead	Justice of the Supreme Court of Florida; 2009–present	Incumbent
Preceded by Ricky Polston	Chief Justice of the Supreme Court of Florida; 2014–2018	Succeeded by Charles T. Canady
