= Florida First District Court of Appeal =

Court in Florida

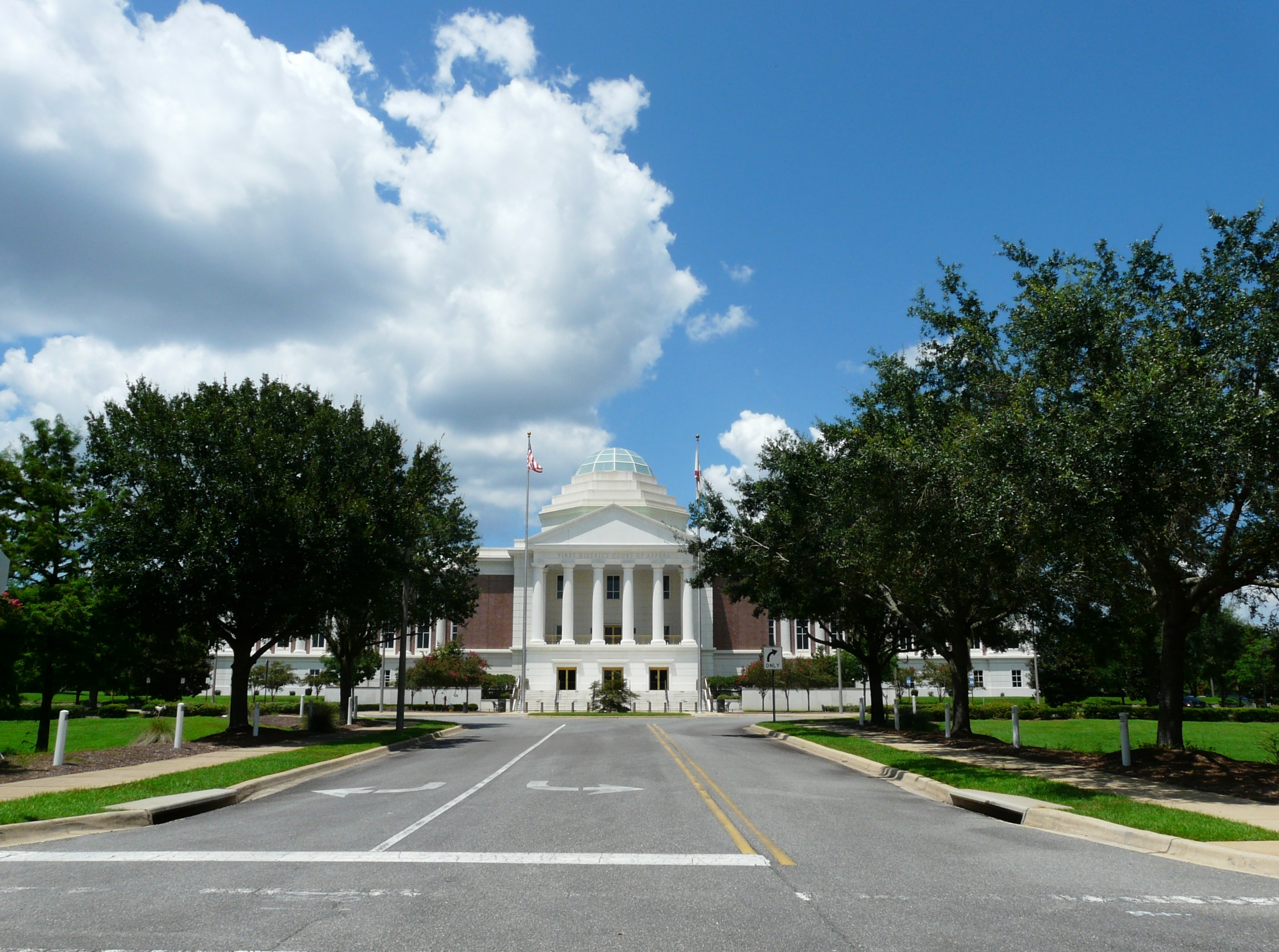
The "Taj Mahal" courthouse

The Florida First District Court of Appeal, also known as the First DCA, is headquartered in Tallahassee, Florida, the state capital. It is unique among the six Florida District Courts of Appeal in that, much like the U.S. Court of Appeals for the D.C. Circuit at the federal level, it handles most of the appeals in state administrative law matters. It is also solely responsible for handling appeals in workers' compensation cases. It is the Court of Appeals for 29 Florida counties, covering the Panhandle as well as the north-central parts of the state. The First DCA includes the following: First Circuit (Escambia, Okaloosa, Santa Rosa & Walton); Second Circuit (Franklin, Gadsden, Jefferson, Leon, Liberty & Wakulla); Third Circuit (Columbia, Dixie, Hamilton, Lafayette, Madison, Suwannee & Taylor); Eighth Circuit (Alachua, Baker, Bradford, Gilchrist, Levy & Union); and Fourteenth Circuit (Bay, Calhoun, Gulf, Holmes, Jackson & Washington).

== Controversy over new courthouse ==
Before December 2010, the First DCA had been located two blocks from the Supreme Court of Florida in downtown Tallahassee. During December, the First DCA moved into a new courthouse on the southeastern outskirts of the city. The $48.8 million construction cost of the new courthouse generated considerable controversy, particularly given that the new building allegedly contained details and amenities such as "miles" of African mahogany-like sapele, granite top desks, and a sixty-inch flat screen television in each judge's chamber. The opulence of the new building led many critics to dub the new courthouse as the "Taj Mahal," and eventually led to the forced resignation of Paul M. Hawkes as the court's chief judge.

Investigation into the building's construction revealed that after receiving an initial $1.8 million appropriation in the 2006 state budget, then-Governor Jeb Bush threatened to veto the appropriation unless the judges considered remodeling and expanding their existing facility. After receiving letters containing such assurances, the governor left the money in the budget. In 2007, judges on the court had the Florida Legislature appropriate an additional $7.9 million toward construction of a new courthouse. In the final days of that year's legislative session, judges had lawmakers slip an amendment into a transportation bill authorizing a $33.5 million bond issue for the new building.

== Sixth DCA ==
Map of the 6 Florida district courts of appeal.

When the Florida Sixth District Court of Appeal was established in 2023, the caseload for the Fourth Circuit, including the counties of Duval, Nassau and Clay was shifted from the 1st DCA to the Florida Fifth District Court of Appeal. The Jacksonville metropolitan area has a population of 1.6 million people.

== Former Chief Judges ==
Judges who have served as Chief Judge of the First DCA include:

- Stephanie W. Ray (2019–2021)
- Joseph Lewis, Jr. (2013–2015)
- Bradford L. Thomas (2017–2019)
- L. Clayton Roberts (2015–2017)

== Active judges ==
Name	Start	Term Expires	Appointer
Lori Rowe, Chief Judge	September 15, 2009	2029	Rick Scott (R)
Stephanie Ray	June 27, 2011	2031	Rick Scott (R)
Joseph Lewis	2001	2026	Jeb Bush (R)
Ray Treadwell	2025	2027	Ron DeSantis (R)
Clayton Roberts	January 18, 2007	2027	Charlie Crist (R)
Timothy Osterhaus	May 20, 2013	2027	Rick Scott (R)
Ross Bilbrey	January 6, 2015	2029	Rick Scott (R)
Susan Kelsey	April 2015	2029	Rick Scott (R)
Thomas Winokur	July 6, 2015	2029	Rick Scott (R)
Kemmerly Thomas	June 20, 2016	2031	Rick Scott (R)
Rachel Nordby	2019	2027	Ron DeSantis (R)
Vacant	January 15, 2026		Ron DeSantis (R)
Robert E. Long	June 10, 2020	2029	Ron DeSantis (R)

== See also ==
- Florida Second District Court of Appeal
- Florida Third District Court of Appeal
- Florida Fourth District Court of Appeal
- Florida Fifth District Court of Appeal
- Florida Sixth District Court of Appeal
