= Ricky Polston =

American judge

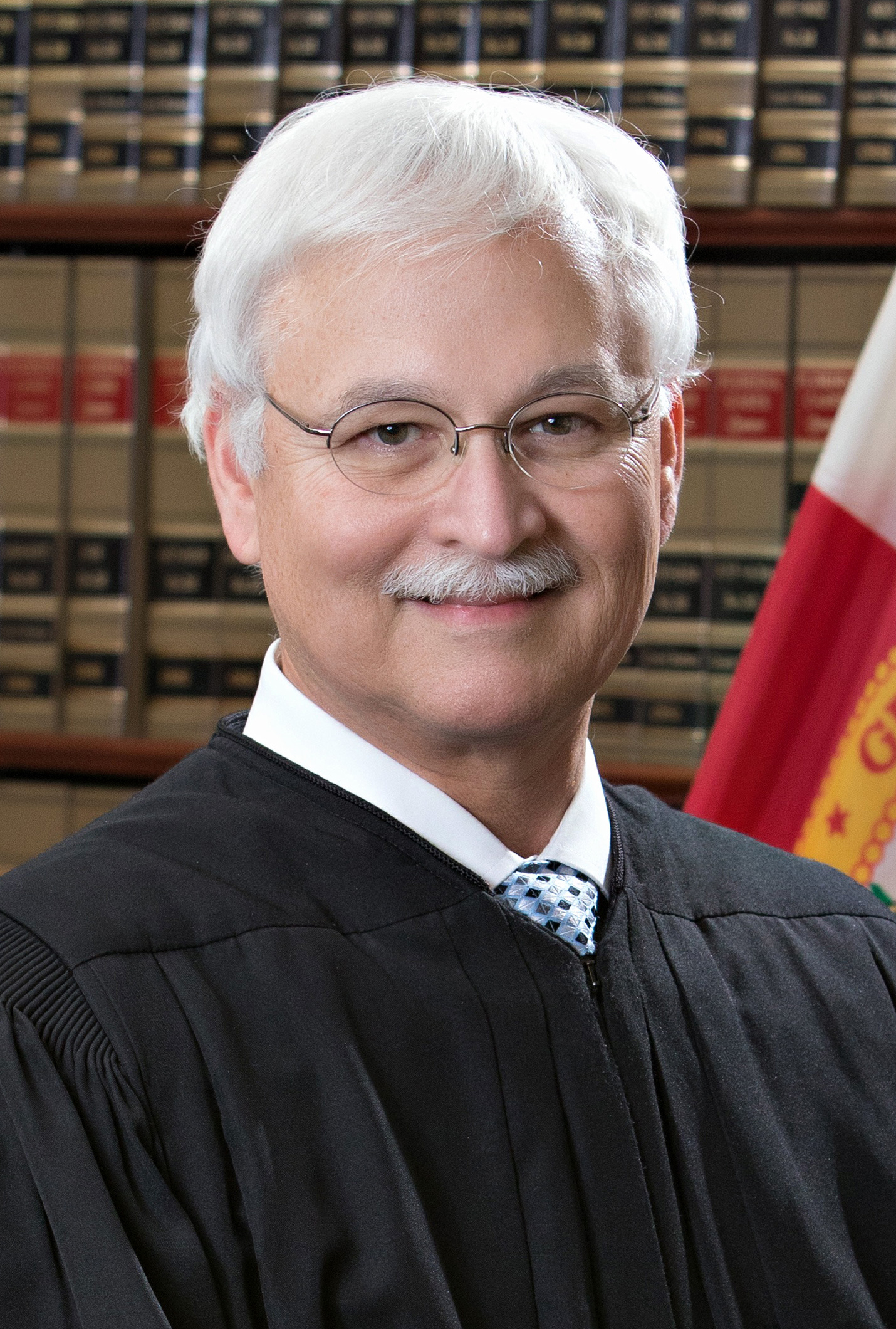

Chief Justice of the Florida Supreme Court
- In office July 1, 2012 – June 30, 2014
- Preceded by: Charles T. Canady
- Succeeded by: Jorge Labarga

Justice of the Supreme Court of Florida
- In office October 2, 2008 – March 31, 2023
- Appointed by: Charlie Crist
- Preceded by: Kenneth B. Bell
- Succeeded by: Meredith Barrios

Personal details
- Born: November 24, 1955 (age 70) Dothan, Alabama, U.S.
- Spouse: Deborah Polston
- Education: Florida State University (BS, JD)

Ricky L. Polston (born November 24, 1955) is an American lawyer who served as a justice of the Florida Supreme Court from 2008 to 2023. He served as the chief justice of the court from July 2012 to June 2014. He is a graduate of Florida State University College of Law.

== Background ==
Polston was raised in Graceville, Florida, and graduated from Graceville High School in 1973 as valedictorian. He received an Associate of Arts from Chipola College in 1975, and a Bachelor of Science, summa cum laude, from Florida State University in 1977. In 1986, he received his Juris Doctor with high honors from the Florida State University College of Law.

Polston is married to children's book author Deborah Ehler Polston. They have ten children, including six whom they have adopted. Described as an "active Christian" by the Miami Herald in 2013, Polston wrote of himself, “I am a product and reflection of Florida. My children are racially diverse, which gives me a better appreciation of different cultures and how they react to each other. In short, I am not isolated as a judge.”

Polston has been a certified public accountant since 1978 and worked as a public accountant from 1977 to 1984. After becoming an attorney, Polston was in private practice from 1987 to 2000. Governor Jeb Bush appointed him a judge of the First District Court of Appeal of Florida on January 2, 2001, where he served until his appointment to the Florida Supreme Court. During his service on the court of appeals, Polston heard over 6,000 appellate cases. Since 2003, Polston has also worked as an adjunct professor at Florida State University College of Law, teaching the Florida Constitutional Law class there for several years.

== Supreme Court appointment ==
Governor Charlie Crist appointed Polston to the Florida Supreme Court on October 1, 2008 to replace Kenneth B. Bell, who resigned that day to return to private practice. Polston was sworn in the next day. He was the second of Crist's four appointments to the Florida Supreme Court.

Polston was elected unanimously to serve as Florida's 55th Chief Justice of the Florida Supreme Court, starting July 1, 2012. Polston, who served a two-year term in the office, is the first Florida State Law alumni to be selected as chief justice.

On March 20, 2023, Polston announced his resignation, effective March 31, 2023. Ron DeSantis thanked Polston on Twitter remarking: "Justice Polston has been a remarkable Justice and was stalwart for the rule of law and the constitution"

Legal offices
Preceded by Kenneth B. Bell	Justice of the Supreme Court of Florida; 2008–2023	Succeeded by Meredith Sasso
