= Charles Canady =

American judge (born 1954)

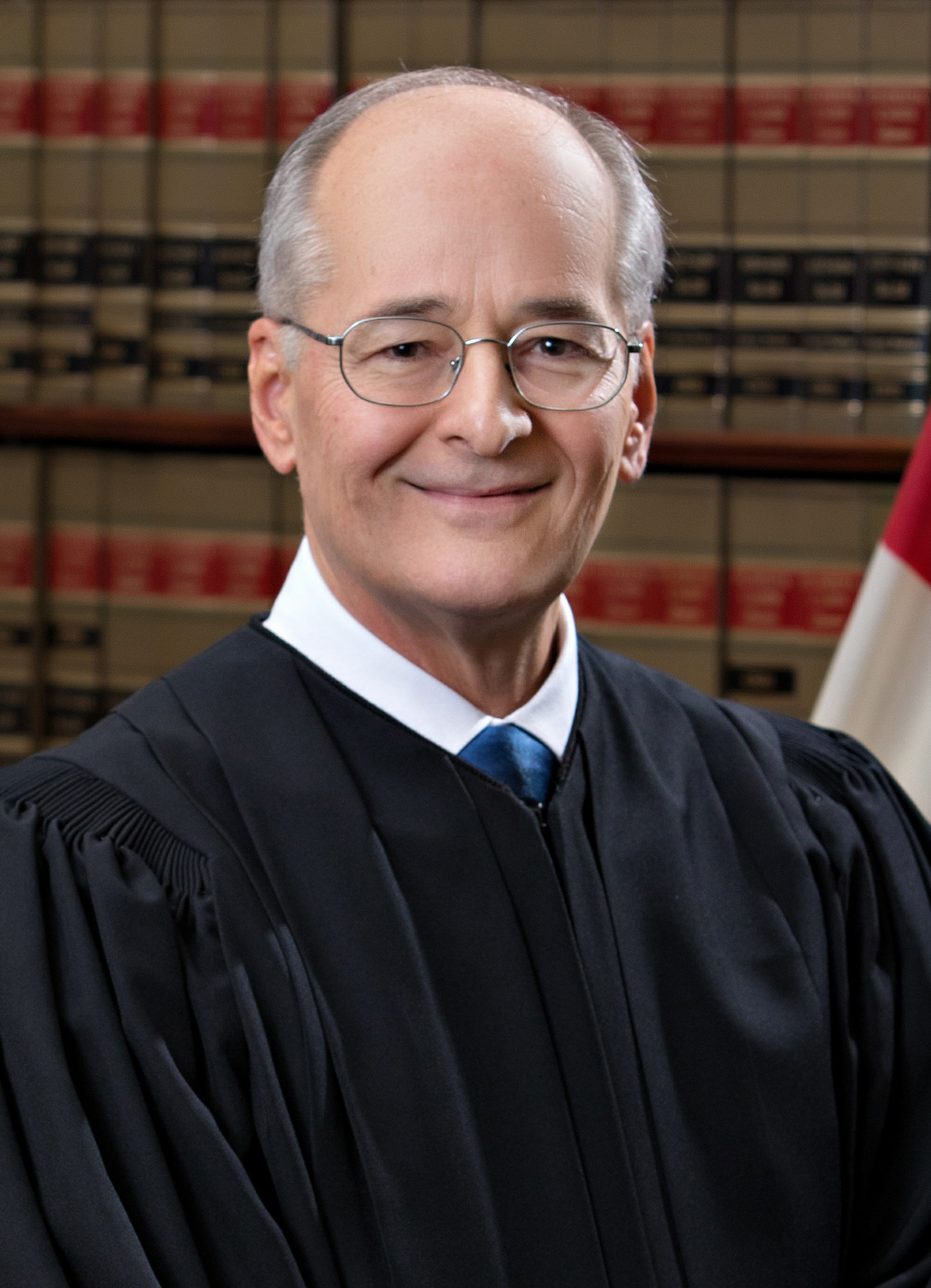
- Canady in 2019

Chief Justice of the Florida Supreme Court
- In office July 1, 2018 – June 30, 2022
- Preceded by: Jorge Labarga
- Succeeded by: Carlos G. Muñiz
- In office July 1, 2010 – June 30, 2012
- Preceded by: Peggy Quince
- Succeeded by: Ricky Polston

Justice of the Florida Supreme Court
- In office September 6, 2008 – December 31, 2025
- Appointed by: Charlie Crist
- Preceded by: Raoul G. Cantero III
- Succeeded by: Adam Tanenbaum

Judge of the Florida Second District Court of Appeal
- In office November 20, 2002 – September 6, 2008
- Appointed by: Jeb Bush
- Preceded by: Oliver Green
- Succeeded by: Marva Crenshaw

Member of the U.S. House of Representatives from Florida's 12th district
- In office January 3, 1993 – January 3, 2001
- Preceded by: Andy Ireland (redistricted)
- Succeeded by: Adam Putnam

Member of the Florida House of Representatives from the 44th district
- In office November 6, 1984 – November 6, 1990
- Preceded by: Gene Ready
- Succeeded by: Joe Viscusi

Personal details
- Born: Charles Terrance Canady; June 22, 1954 (age 72) Lakeland, Florida, U.S.
- Party: Democratic (before 1989); Republican (1989–present)
- Spouse: Jennifer Canady
- Education: Haverford College (BA); Yale University (JD)

Charles Terrance Canady (born June 22, 1954) is an American attorney and judge who served as a justice of the Supreme Court of Florida from 2008 to 2025. He previously served as Chief Justice from 2010 to 2012 and from 2018 to 2022.

Prior to his appointment to the Supreme Court, Canady was a judge on Florida's Second District Court of Appeal from 2002 to 2008, and a Republican member of the United States House of Representatives from 1993 to 2001.

== Early life and career ==
Born in Lakeland, Florida, Canady graduated with a Bachelor of Arts from Haverford College in 1976 and a Juris Doctor from Yale Law School in 1979. He was admitted to the bar the same year and began his practice in Lakeland. In 1983, he was hired as the legal counsel for the Central Florida Regional Planning Commission. From 1984 to 1990, Canady served as a member of the Florida House of Representatives, initially elected as a conservative Democrat, he switched parties in June 1989. The change created many hard feelings as it happened after he accepted Democratic money for his re-election campaign. He ran for the Florida State Senate in 1990, losing to Quillian Yancey.

== U.S. House of Representatives ==
In 1992, Canady made a successful bid for the U.S. House of Representatives, narrowly defeating his Democratic opponent, State Representative Tom Mims. In Congress, Canady was credited for coining the term "partial-birth abortion" while developing the Partial-Birth Abortion Ban Act of 1995. According to Keri Folmar, the lawyer responsible for the bill's language, the term was developed in early 1995 in a meeting among herself, Canady and National Right to Life Committee lobbyist Douglas Johnson. Canady could not find this particular abortion practice named in any medical textbook and therefore he and his aides named it. Canady served as the Chairman of the Subcommittee on the Constitution of the House Judiciary Committee between January 1995 and January 2001. During this tenure, Canady led an inquiry on the question of assisted suicide in the United States. The report published was later cited in the Supreme Court decision, Washington v. Glucksberg, which ruled that the Constitution did not protect a right to assisted suicide. Canady was one of the House managers appointed to prosecute the impeachment trial proceedings of President Bill Clinton. He did not seek re-election to a fifth term in 2000, keeping a term limits pledge he made in 1992.

== Judicial service ==
After leaving Congress, Canady served as general counsel for Florida Governor Jeb Bush before he was appointed a judge on the Second Florida District Court of Appeal in 2002, taking seat in November of that year. On August 27, 2008, Governor Charlie Crist appointed Canady to the Supreme Court of Florida to replace Justice Raoul Cantero, who was returning to private practice. He became the 82nd justice of the Florida Supreme Court on September 6, 2008.

In 2013, Governor Rick Scott signed the Timely Justice Act (HB 7101) which overhauled the processes for capital punishment; the United States Supreme Court struck down part of this law in January 2016 in Hurst v. Florida, leading the Florida legislature to pass a new statute. The new sentencing scheme came before the Florida Supreme Court in October 2016, which held that a death sentence must be issued by a unanimous jury. Canady was one of two justices to dissent from this opinion, with coverage noting his inclusion amongst Donald Trump's list of potential U.S. Supreme Court nominees which was released less than a month earlier.

== See also ==
- List of American politicians who switched parties in office
- Donald Trump Supreme Court candidates

U.S. House of Representatives
Preceded by Tom Lewis	Member of the U.S. House of Representatives from Florida's 12th congressional district 1993–2001	Succeeded by Adam Putnam
Legal offices
Preceded by Raoul Cantero	Justice of the Florida Supreme Court; 2008–2025	Succeeded by Adam Tanenbaum
Preceded by Peggy Quince	Chief Justice of the Florida Supreme Court; 2010–2012	Succeeded by Ricky Polston
Preceded by Jorge Labarga	Chief Justice of the Florida Supreme Court; 2018–2022	Succeeded by Carlos G. Muñiz
U.S. order of precedence (ceremonial)
Preceded by Brenda Lawrence as Former U.S. Representative	Order of precedence of the United States as Former U.S. Representative	Succeeded by Ric Keller as Former U.S. Representative
