= Florida Judicial Nominating Commission =

The Florida Judicial Nominating Commissions are 26 separately constituted bodies responsible for providing the governor of Florida with a list of possible appointments to the various state courts (the Florida Supreme Court, the six Florida District Courts of Appeal, and the twenty Florida Circuit Courts). These commissions are required under Article V of the Florida Constitution.

== Composition and operations ==
The Constitution specifies that "[w]henever a vacancy occurs in a judicial office to which election for retention applies, the governor shall fill the vacancy by appointing... one of not fewer than three persons nor more than six persons nominated by the appropriate judicial nominating Commission". This provision applies to Florida Supreme Court justices and Florida District Court judges. The Constitution makes a similar provision for Florida Circuit Court judges, except that such positions are normally filled in elections, and the governor may only step in where there is a vacancy well before the next election. further provides that "[t]here shall be a separate judicial nominating Commission as provided by general law for the supreme court, each district court of appeal, and each judicial circuit for all trial courts within the circuit", This section requires that the Commissions have uniform rules of procedure, and that their proceedings and records must be open to the public.

The composition of the Commissions is laid out elsewhere in the Constitution, which requires that each Commission be composed of:

a. Three members appointed by the board of governors of the Florida Bar from among Florida Bar members who are actively engaged in the practice of law with offices within the territorial jurisdiction of the affected court, district or circuit;
b. Three electors who reside in the territorial jurisdiction of the court or circuit appointed by the governor; and
c. Three electors who reside in the territorial jurisdiction of the court or circuit and who are not members of the bar of Florida, selected and appointed by a majority vote of the other six members of the Commission.

The Constitution prohibits judges and justices from serving on any Commission, and disqualifies Commission members from being appointed to judicial office until two years after they leave the Commission. It also sets the term of office of Commission members at four years.
