= Florida Supreme Court =

Highest court in the U.S. state of Florida

Coordinates: 30.438092°N 84.283585°W

Supreme Court of Florida
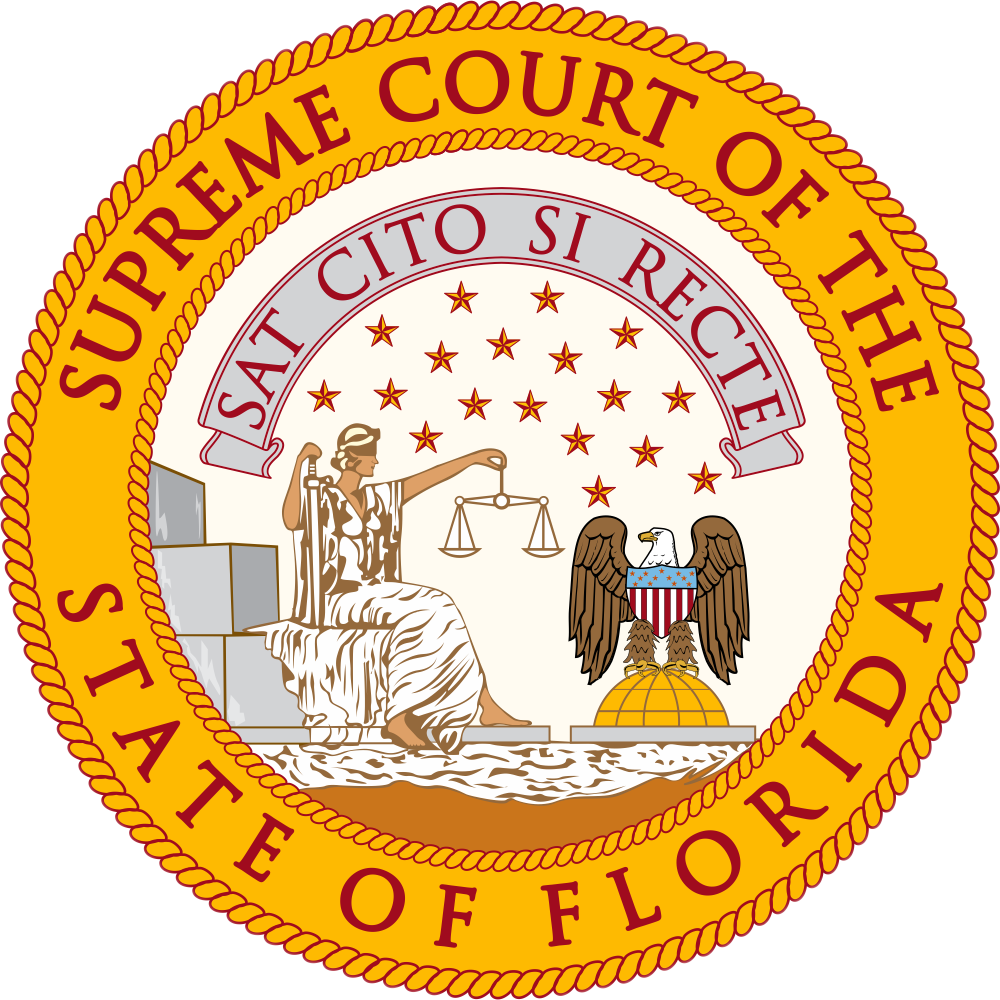

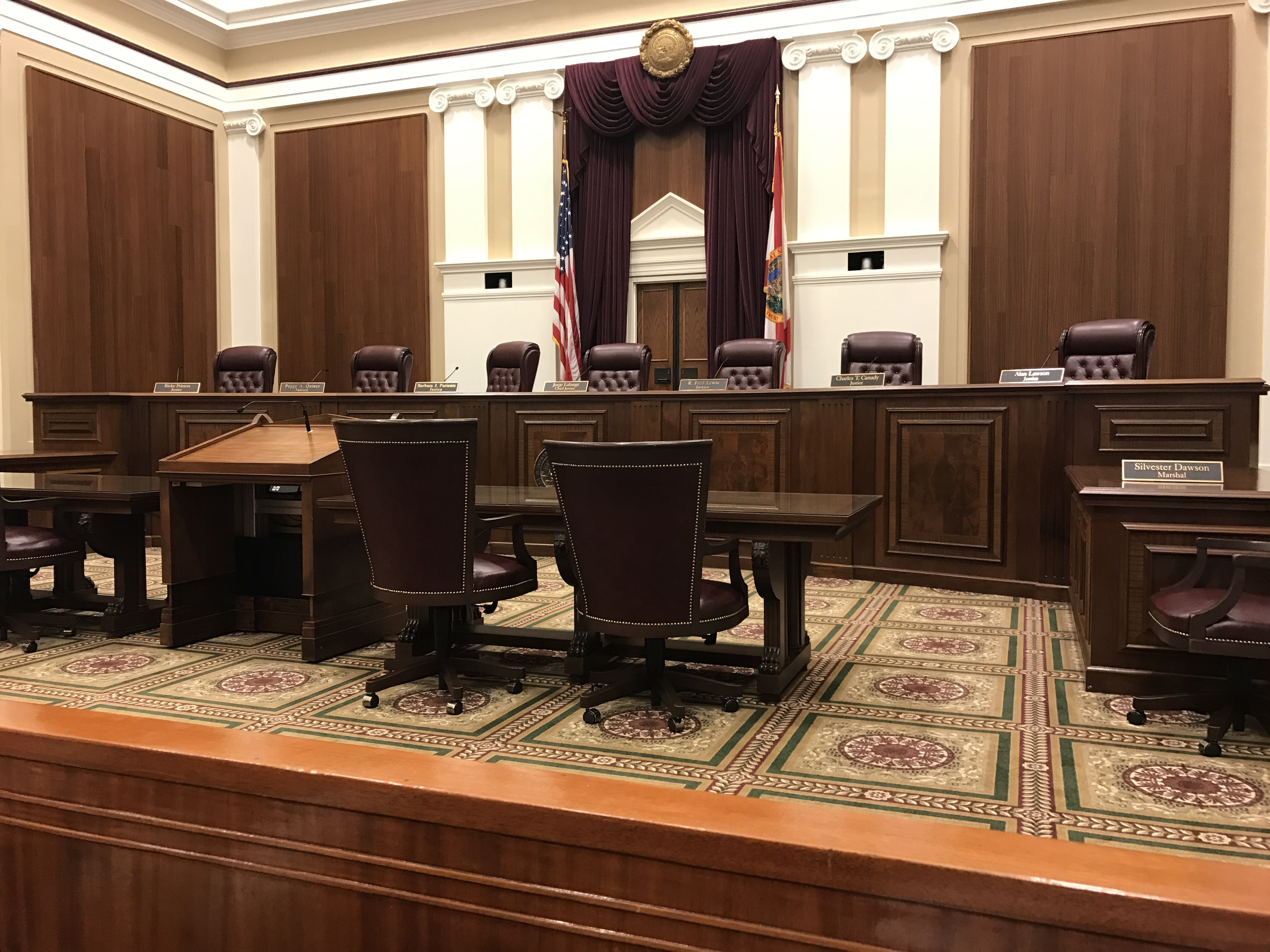
- Courtroom in 2017
- Established: 1845
- Location: Tallahassee, Florida, United States
- Composition method: Gubernatorial appointment
- Authorised by: Florida Constitution
- Appeals to: Supreme Court of the United States only for federal issues; otherwise cases cannot be appealed.
- Judge term length: 6 years
- Number of positions: 7
- Website: Official website

Chief Justice
- Currently: John D. Couriel
- Since: July 1, 2026
- Lead position ends: June 30, 2028

The Supreme Court of Florida is the highest court in the U.S. state of Florida. It consists of seven justices—one of whom serves as Chief Justice. Six members are chosen from six districts around the state to foster geographic diversity, and one is selected at large.

The justices are appointed by the governor to set terms, which do not exceed six years. Immediately after appointment, the initial term is three years or less because the justices must appear on the ballot in the next general election that occurs more than one year after their appointment. Afterward, they serve six-year terms and remain in office if retained in the general election near the end of each term. Citizens vote on whether or not they want to retain each justice in office.

Chief justices are elected by the members of the Court to two-year terms that end in every even-numbered year. Chief justices may succeed themselves in office if they are re-elected by the other justices. The chief justice also can appoint judges to temporary duty on the Court if at least one of the justices is unable to hear a case for any reason. The temporary justices are called "associate justices" and are usually chosen on a rotating basis from presiding judges of Florida's district courts of appeal. They usually sit only for a single case. Unlike the U.S. Supreme Court, the term "associate justice" is never used to describe the sitting Florida justices.

The Court is the final arbiter of state law of Florida, and its decisions are binding authority for all other Florida state courts, as well as for federal courts when they apply Florida law. In most instances, the only appeal from the Florida Supreme Court is to the U.S. Supreme Court on questions of federal law.

Established upon statehood in 1845, the Florida Supreme Court is headquartered across Duval Street from the state capitol in Tallahassee. Throughout the court's history, it has undergone many reorganizations as Florida's population has grown.

As of October 2020, each justice of the Florida Supreme Court receives a salary of $227,218.

== History ==
After Florida's entrance into the union in 1845, and the ratification of the state's first Constitution, the Supreme Court of the State of Florida was born. It is the successor to the Florida Territorial Court of Appeals and the court system that existed under Spain prior to the acquisition of Florida by the U.S. through the Adams-Onis Treaty. Though the constitution created a Supreme Court, it vested it with no judges and little power. Florida Circuit court judges served in the capacity of Supreme Court justices until 1851 when an 1848 constitutional amendment took effect granting the state legislature power to choose three justices. In 1853, another constitutional amendment was adopted that provided for the popular election of justices to serve six-year terms.

Following the Civil War and the adoption of the 1868 Constitution, justices were appointed by the governor and confirmed by the State Senate. In 1885, the state returned to elected justices. In 1940, the court's membership was finally increased to its current size of seven members, and a 1926 constitutional amendment provided that the chief justice should be elected by the justices of the Court. A two-year term for the chief justice was established by the Rules of Court adopted by the Supreme Court, with each term beginning on July 1 of even-numbered years and ending on June 30 in the next even-numbered year.

In the early 1970s, more than half the justices resigned over various corruption probes.

In 1975, Florida Supreme Court justice David McCain tampered with a lower court decision on behalf of campaign supporters. Faced with impeachment proceedings, he resigned.

In 1976, the state returned to appointed justices when the current merit retention system was put in place.

In 2004, the court had a backlog of 1,544 cases. In 2011, there was a backlog of 881 cases.

== Powers ==
=== Jurisdiction ===
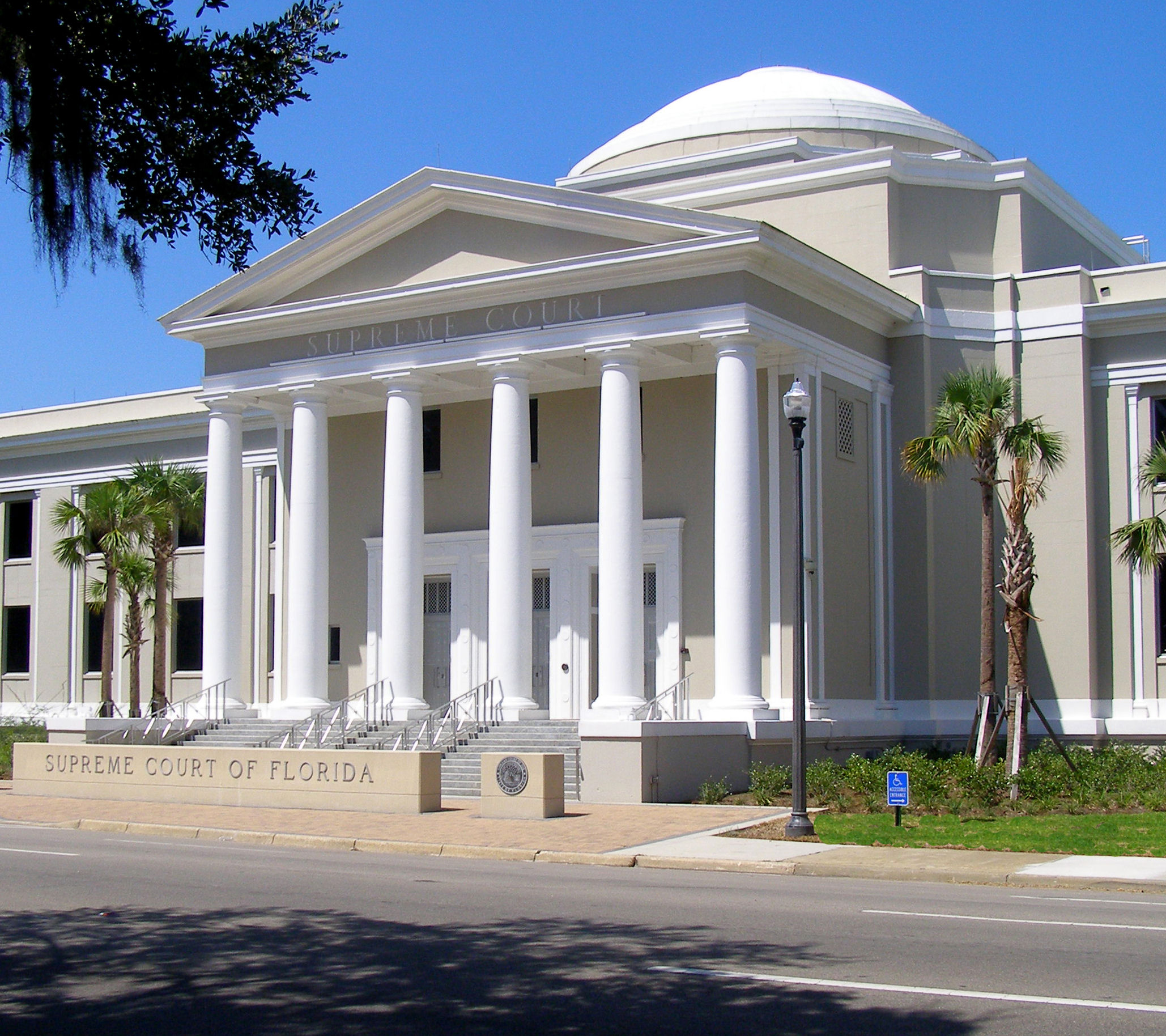
The front exterior of the Florida Supreme Court Building in Tallahassee, Florida, in 2011

The jurisdiction of the Supreme Court of Florida is laid out in Article V of the Florida Constitution. The Court follows the common law and since its first case, Stewart v. Preston (1846), has published its opinions, first in official law reports called the Florida Reports and more recently in the Southern Series edited by West Publishing.

The Supreme Court of Florida has appellate jurisdiction that is discretionary (cases the Court may choose to hear if it wishes) in most cases and mandatory (cases the court must hear) in a few cases. In some matters, the Court has original jurisdiction, meaning that the case can begin and end in the Supreme Court absent a basis for further appeal to the Supreme Court of the United States. The Court also has some forms of exclusive jurisdiction, meaning that it is the only court or government body that can decide the issue.

==== Mandatory jurisdiction ====
The Florida Constitution, Article V, (3)(b)(1), establishes mandatory jurisdiction for the following:

- Cases in which the death penalty is imposed (but solely to review findings of lower courts on the law, not on the facts). In such instances, the Florida Supreme Court directly reviews circuit court decisions, skipping the intermediate district courts of appeal (DCAs).
- Decisions by the DCAs declaring invalid a state statute or constitutional provision.
- The Florida Constitution, Article V, (3)(b)(2), permits the Florida Legislature to provide for mandatory jurisdiction in the following two circumstances (the legislature has so provided):
  - For final judgments on proceedings for validation of bonds or certificates of indebtedness. Here again, the Florida Supreme Court directly reviews circuit court decisions.
  - For review of action of statewide agencies relating to rates or service of electric, gas, and telephone utilities.

==== Discretionary jurisdiction ====
The Florida Constitution, Article V, (3)(b)(3–5), provides discretionary jurisdiction for a much larger set of circumstances, including:

- DCA decisions expressly declaring a state statute or constitutional provision to be valid (as opposed to invalid, which as stated above places the appellate court decision under mandatory jurisdiction)
- DCA decisions that expressly affect a class of constitutional/state officers
- DCA decisions that expressly and directly conflict with the decision of another DCA or of the Florida Supreme Court (including decisions that the DCA certifies to be in conflict with an opinion of another DCA)
- DCA decisions that the DCA certifies, or orders or judgments of trial courts certified by a DCA in which appeal is pending, to be of "great public importance", or to have a great effect on the proper administration of justice throughout the state, and certified to require immediate resolution by the Supreme Court
- Questions of law certified by the Supreme Court of the United States or a United States court of appeals as determinative of a cause before them, for which there is no controlling precedent by the Florida Supreme Court.

==== Original nonexclusive jurisdiction ====
The Florida Constitution further grants the Supreme Court original nonexclusive jurisdiction over certain matters. "Original" means that the case can begin and end in the state Supreme Court absent a basis for further appeal to the U.S. Supreme Court. "Nonexclusive" means that these matters do not absolutely have to begin in the Supreme Court, but also could originate in a lower court. The bulk of matters falling within this category often are called the "extraordinary writs" and include habeas corpus, mandamus, quo warranto, and the writ of prohibition.

==== Exclusive jurisdiction ====
The Supreme Court has exclusive jurisdiction over some other matters. "Exclusive" means that the Florida Supreme Court is the only court or governmental body that can resolve the issue. This category includes regulation of the Florida Bar, regulation of admissions to the Bar, creating and amending the Florida Rules of Court, and determining whether the governor is incapacitated and thus unable to fulfill the duties of office. It also includes two forms of jurisdiction to issue advisory opinions. The Court can provide an advisory opinion upon a request by the governor to address uncertainties about legal issues involving the executive branch's powers. It also can issue advisory opinions to the Florida attorney general about citizens' initiatives to amend the state Constitution. However, for this last type of advisory opinion, the Court only determines whether the citizens' initiative meets two legal requirements: its ballot summary fairly advises the voters of its effect; and it only contains a single subject. A negative advisory opinion removes non-conforming initiatives from the ballot.

==== Prohibited areas ====
Pursuant to a 1980 amendment to the Florida Constitution, the Supreme Court has no jurisdiction to review a "per curiam affirmed" decision by one of the Florida District Courts of Appeal, meaning that, in the vast majority of cases, decisions of the Florida District Court of Appeal are final, subject only to the possibility of review by the United States Supreme Court. For an example in which a "per curiam affirmed" decision was reviewed by the United States Supreme Court and reversed, see Ibanez v. Florida Department of Business and Professional Regulation, 512 U.S. 136 (1994). In the Ibanez case, the Florida State Board of Accountancy held that a CPA who was also a lawyer was prohibited from disclosing on her law firm letterhead that she was also a CPA, and the First District Court of Appeal "per curiam affirmed" the decision. The United States Supreme Court reversed.

=== Duties ===
The Supreme Court also has the duty to review legislative redistricting after each decennial Census. After the Florida Legislature enacts a joint resolution reapportioning the State House and Senate, the plan is presented to the Supreme Court on a petition filed by the Florida attorney general. The Supreme Court's review of an apportionment plan created by the Legislature is guided by several standards specified in the Constitution, including new ones added to the Constitution by the voters in 2010 that prohibit gerrymandering. If the Legislature fails to initially pass a reapportionment plan or fails to enact a remedial plan after its primary plan is rejected by the Supreme Court, then the Court has the duty to apportion the State. The Supreme Court also has the authority to impose discipline on state judges for ethical breaches, which can range from a public televised reprimand to removal from office.

== Organization ==
=== Composition ===
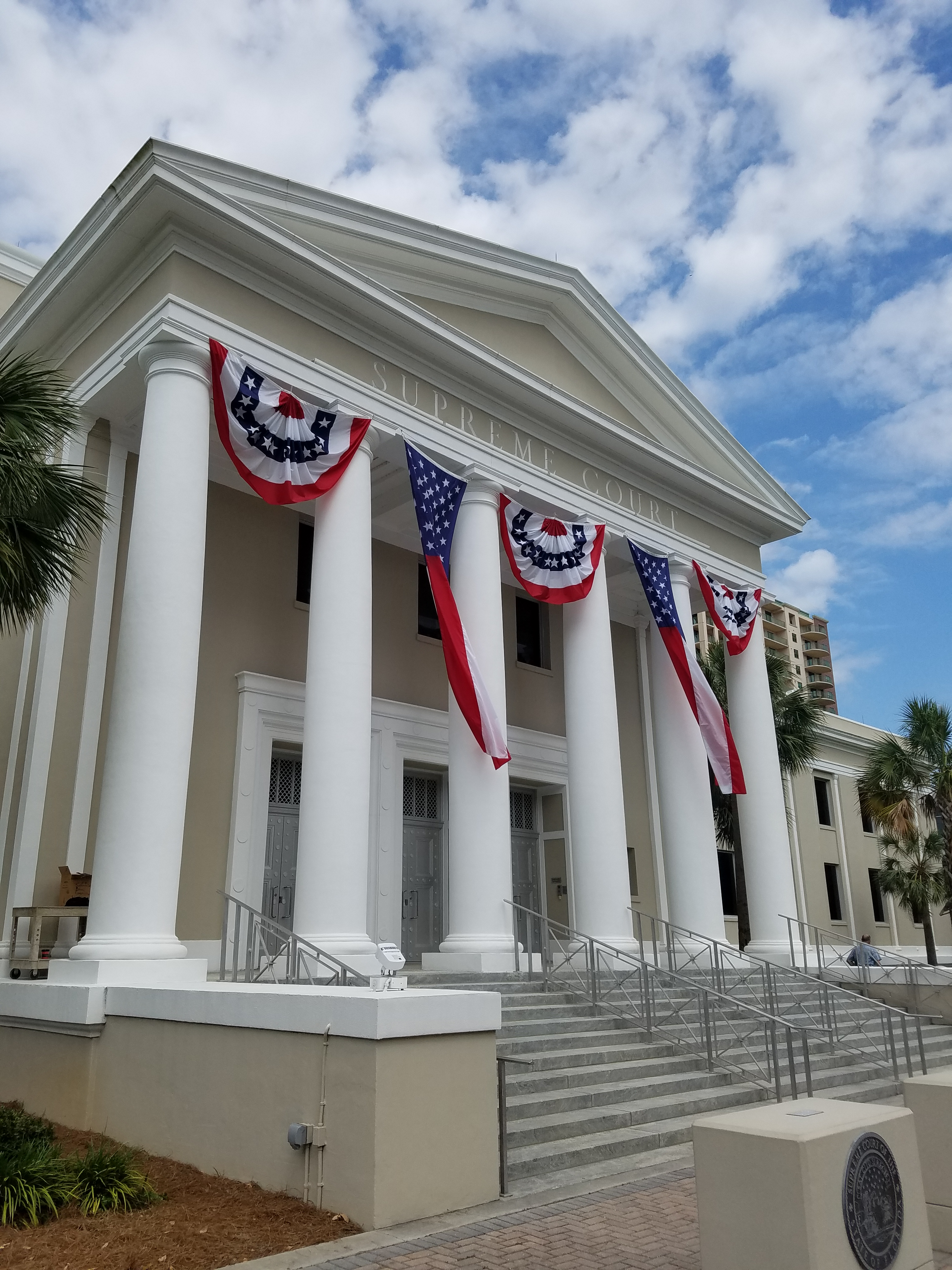
Florida Supreme Court with bunting in 2019

The Court is composed of the chief justice and six other justices, who all serve six-year staggered terms. The justices elect the chief justice from amongst themselves. Justices must be an elector (a qualified, registered voter) of the state and must have been a member in good standing of the Florida Bar for at least ten years. The Court must have at least one justice who resided in each of Florida's six lower appellate districts on the date of their appointment. Amendment 6 passed in 2018 raised the mandatory retirement age for justices to 75, effective July 1, 2019.

=== Operation ===
At least five justices must be present for the Court to carry out its official functions, and at least four justices must agree on decisions issued by the Court. The chief justice can assign judges of the lower courts to serve as temporary justices (called "associate justices" under Florida Rules of Court) if the need arises. Under the Court's Internal Operations Procedures Manual, the appointment of associate justices rotates among the chief judges of the district courts of appeal in their numerical order, from one to five, and then starts over again. The intent behind this procedure is to eliminate any concern that temporary associate justices are appointed because of their personal views on legal issues.

The Court holds two terms each year, with the first commencing on the first day of January and the second beginning on the first day of July.

=== Appointment, retention and impeachment ===
A relatively complex appointment process (a modified form of the "Missouri Plan") is set forth in the Florida Constitution, which requires the creation of a Judicial Nominating Commission composed of persons appointed to staggered four-year terms, representing various interests. The commission must submit to the governor of Florida between three and six names for each vacancy on the court, from which the governor selects the new justice. The governor's selection is final and requires no further approval by any governmental body. Up until 1971 when merit selection was implemented, judges were chosen by direct election of the people. In 1974, Justice Ben Overton became the first Supreme Court justice chosen by merit selection.

Justices must meet four requirements to qualify for appointment to the Court: they must be an elector (a qualified, registered voter) of the state, they must reside in the territorial jurisdiction of the state when they assume office, they must be members of the Florida Bar for at least ten years, and they must be under 75 years of age.

After appointment, the new justice must face statewide voters in the next general election that is more than one year after the date of initial appointment. In this "merit retention" election, voters decide only if the new justice will remain in office. If not retained in office, the governor appoints a replacement through the same Judicial Nominating Commission process. After this first merit retention election, justices face the voters in the same type of merit retention election every six years thereafter until they leave or reach retirement age.

Following a constitutional amendment passed by referendum in November 2018, mandatory retirement for Florida Supreme Court justices occurs upon reaching age 75. The Florida Constitution states, "No justice or judge shall serve after attaining the age of seventy-five years except upon temporary assignment." They thus must retire on the date of their 75th birthdays if still in office at that time.

Justices may be removed by one of two methods. They can be disciplined upon the recommendation of the Judicial Qualifications Commission, at which time the Court may remove a justice or impose a lesser penalty such as a fine or reprimand; and justices may be impeached by a two-thirds vote of the Florida House of Representatives and convicted by a two-thirds vote of the Senate.

=== Justices ===
District (Note: The Constitution of Florida requires each of the state's appellate districts to be represented by at least one justice on the Supreme Court who was resident in that district at the time of their initial appointment or election. During the 2022 legislative session, the appellate district boundaries were changed, resulting in the creation of a sixth appellate district.)	Name	Born	Start	Chief term	Term ends	Mandatory retirement (Note: Justices must retire by their 75th birthday.)	Appointer	Law school
3rd	John D. Couriel, Chief Justice	March 23, 1978 (age 48)	June 1, 2020	2026–present	January 2, 2029	2053	Ron DeSantis (R)	Harvard
4th	Jorge Labarga	October 21, 1952 (age 74)	January 6, 2009	2014–2018	January 2, 2029	2027	Charlie Crist (R)	Florida
1st	Carlos G. Muñiz	June 25, 1969 (age 57)	January 22, 2019	2022–2026	January 4, 2033	2044	Ron DeSantis (R)	Yale
5th	Jamie Grosshans	October 27, 1978 (age 48)	September 14, 2020	–	January 2, 2029	2053	Ron DeSantis (R)	Mississippi
4th	Renatha Francis	November 23, 1977 (age 48)	September 1, 2022	–	January 6, 2031	2052	Ron DeSantis (R)	Florida Coastal
6th	Meredith Barrios	February 15, 1983 (age 43)	May 25, 2023	–	January 6, 2031	2058	Ron DeSantis (R)	Florida
2nd	Adam Tanenbaum	February 6, 1972 (age 54)	January 15, 2026	–	January 2, 2029	2047	Ron DeSantis (R)	Georgetown

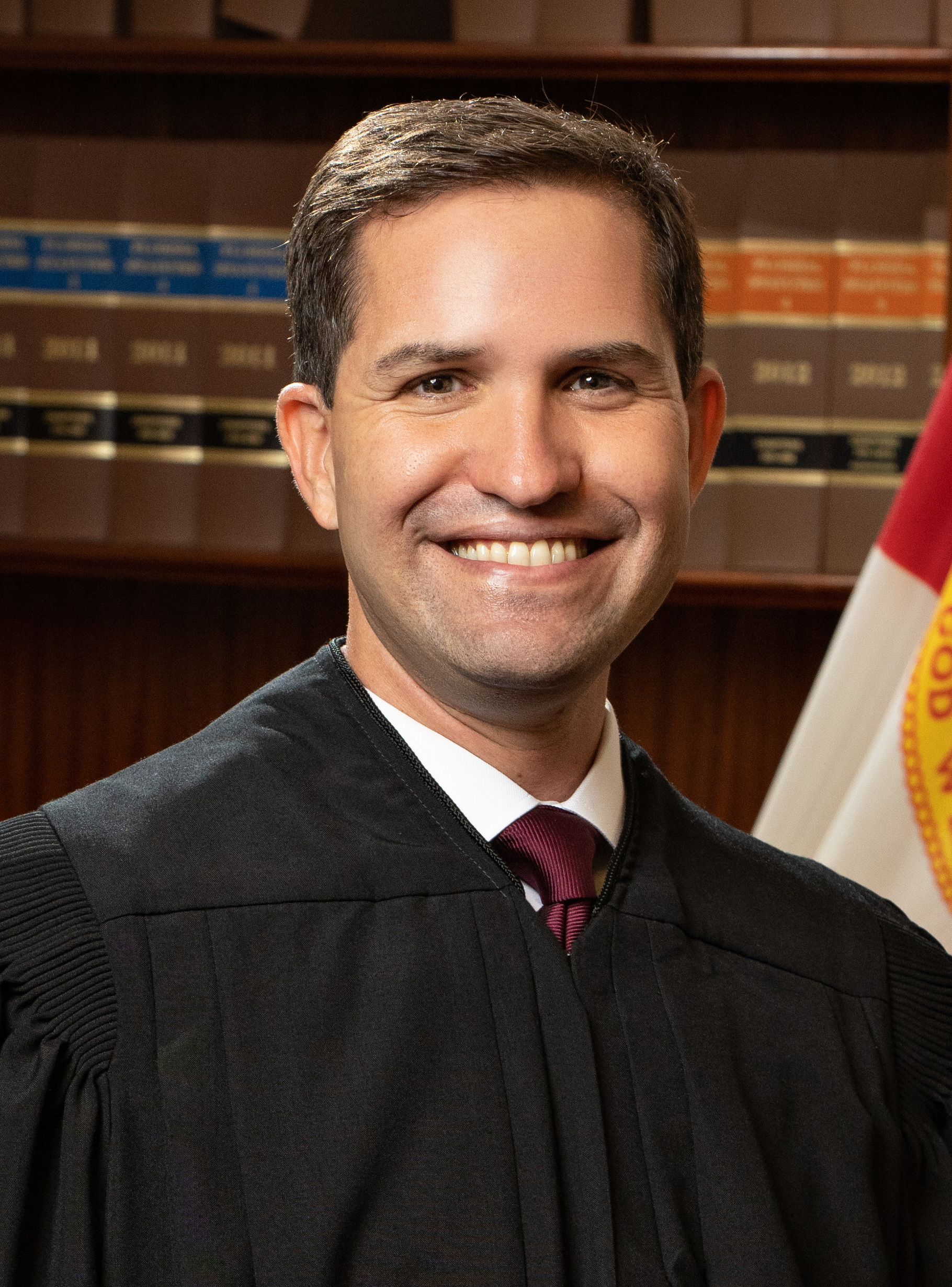
Chief Justice John D. Couriel

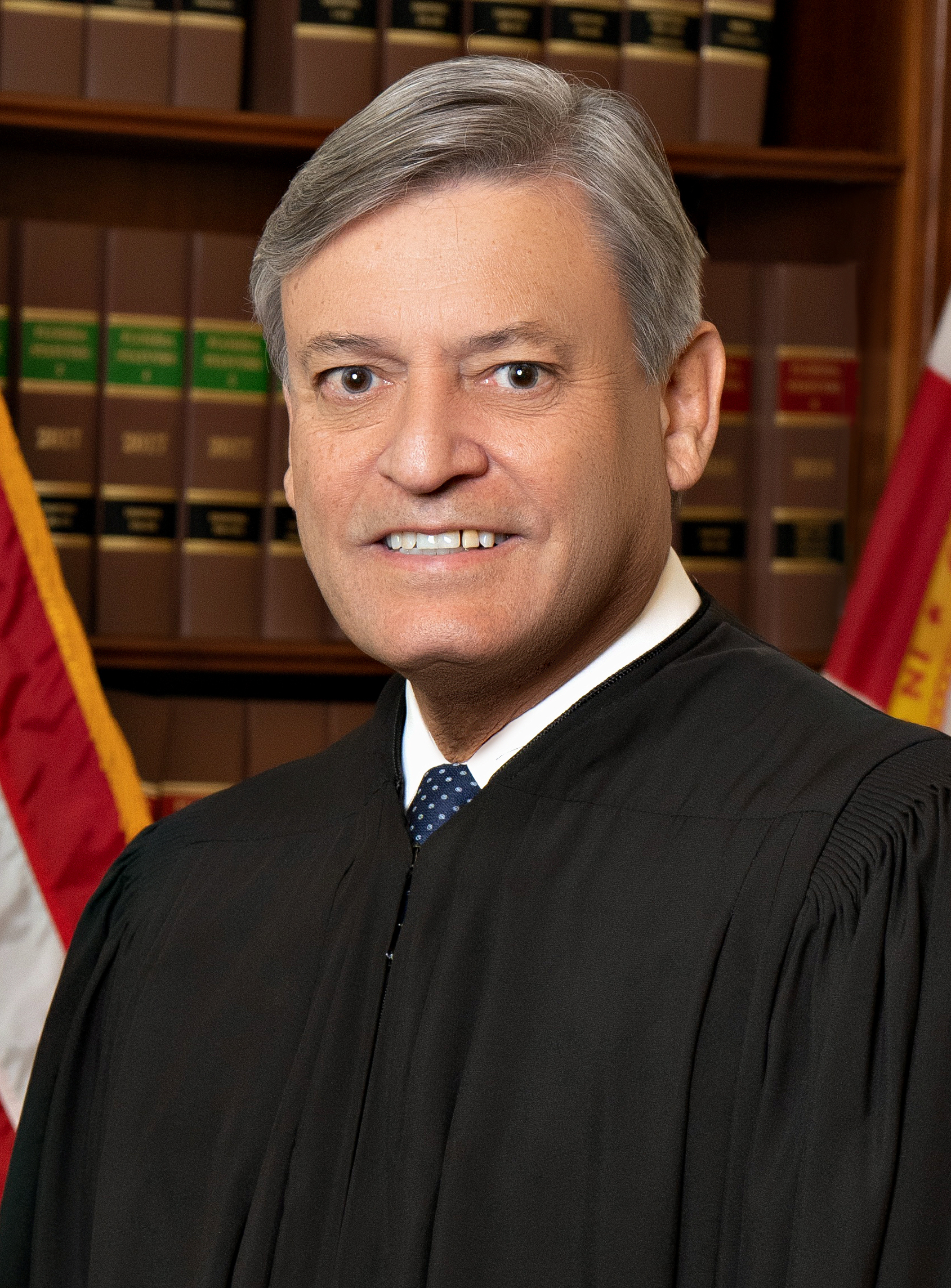
Justice Jorge Labarga

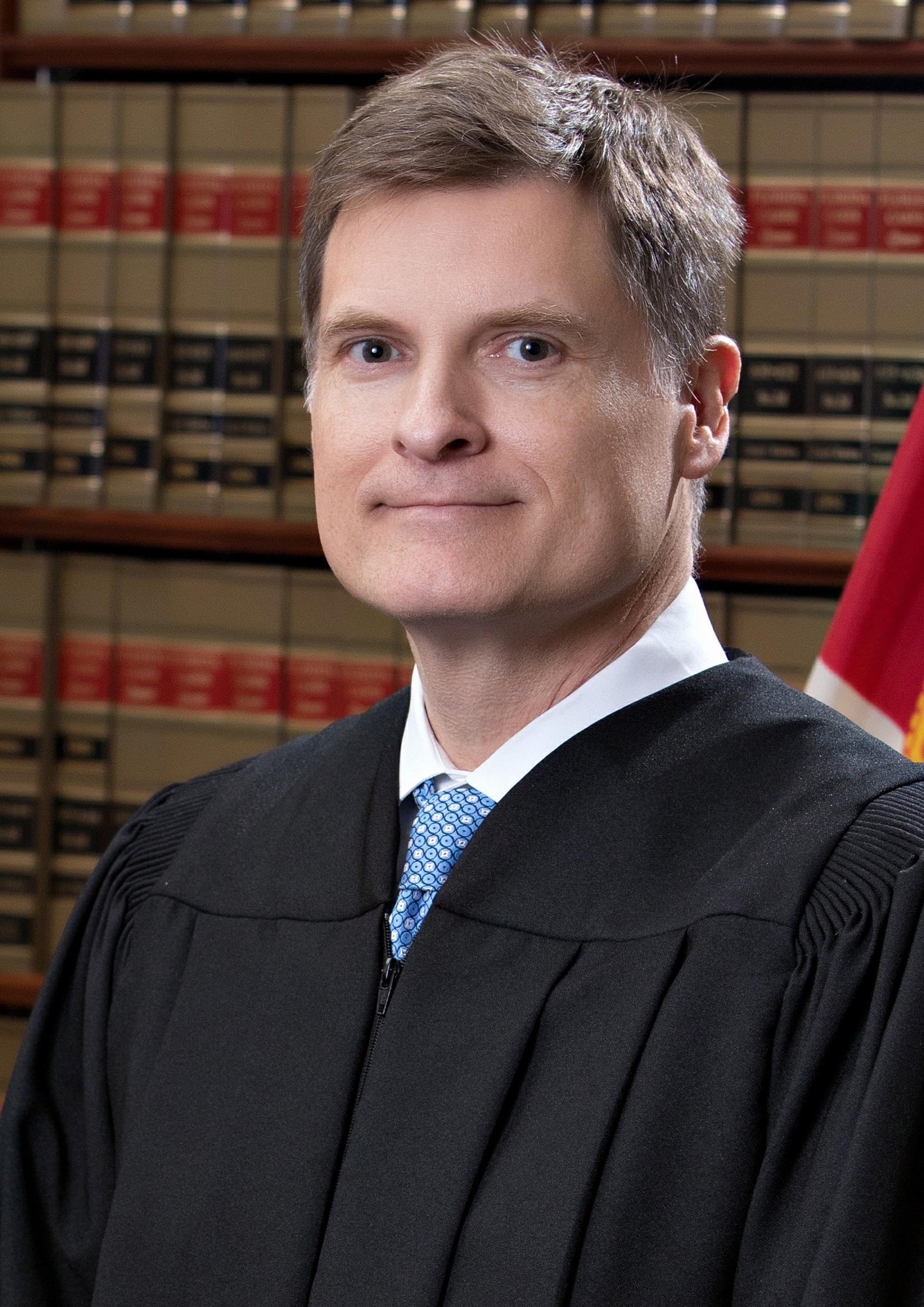
Justice Carlos G. Muñiz

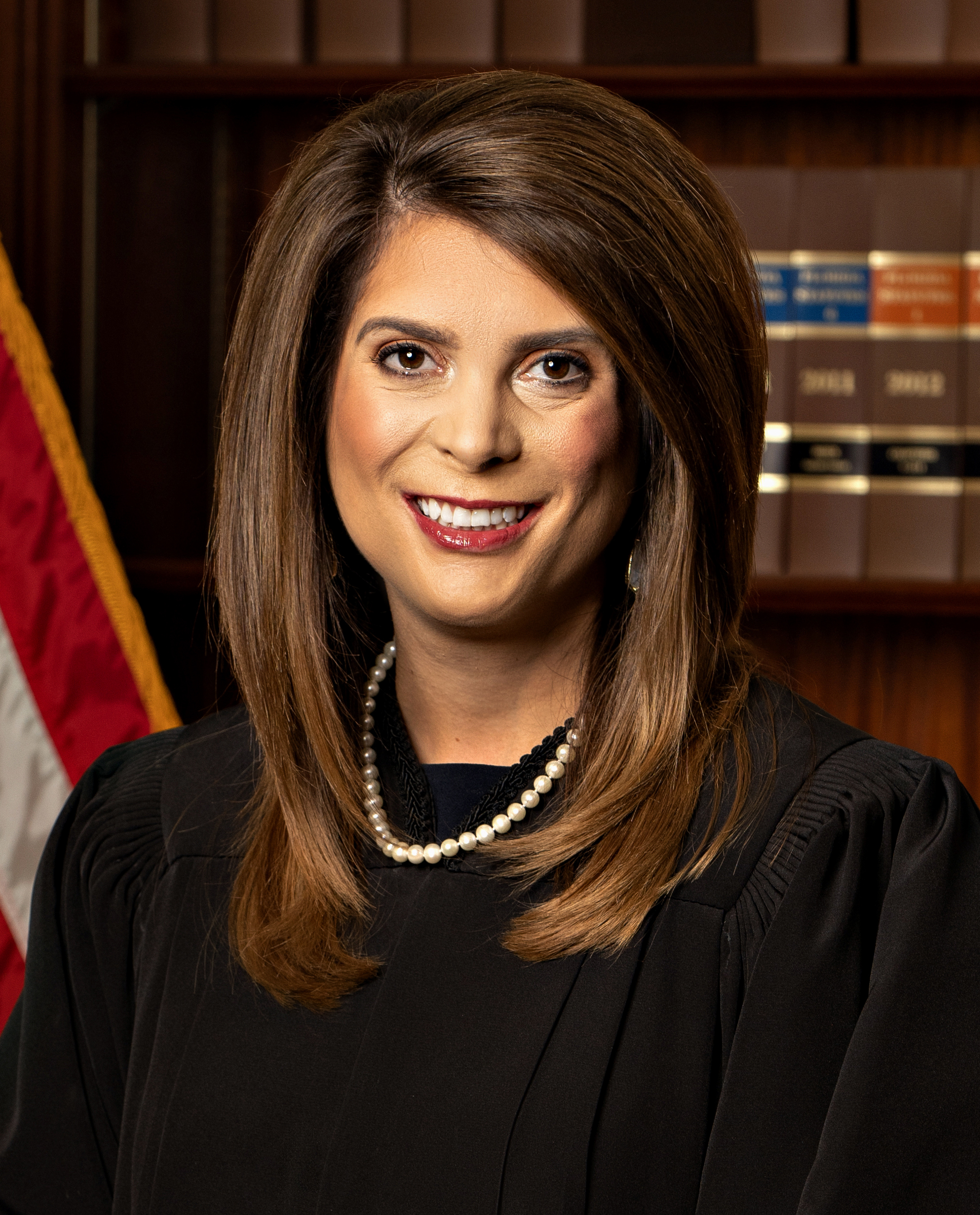
Justice Jamie Grosshans

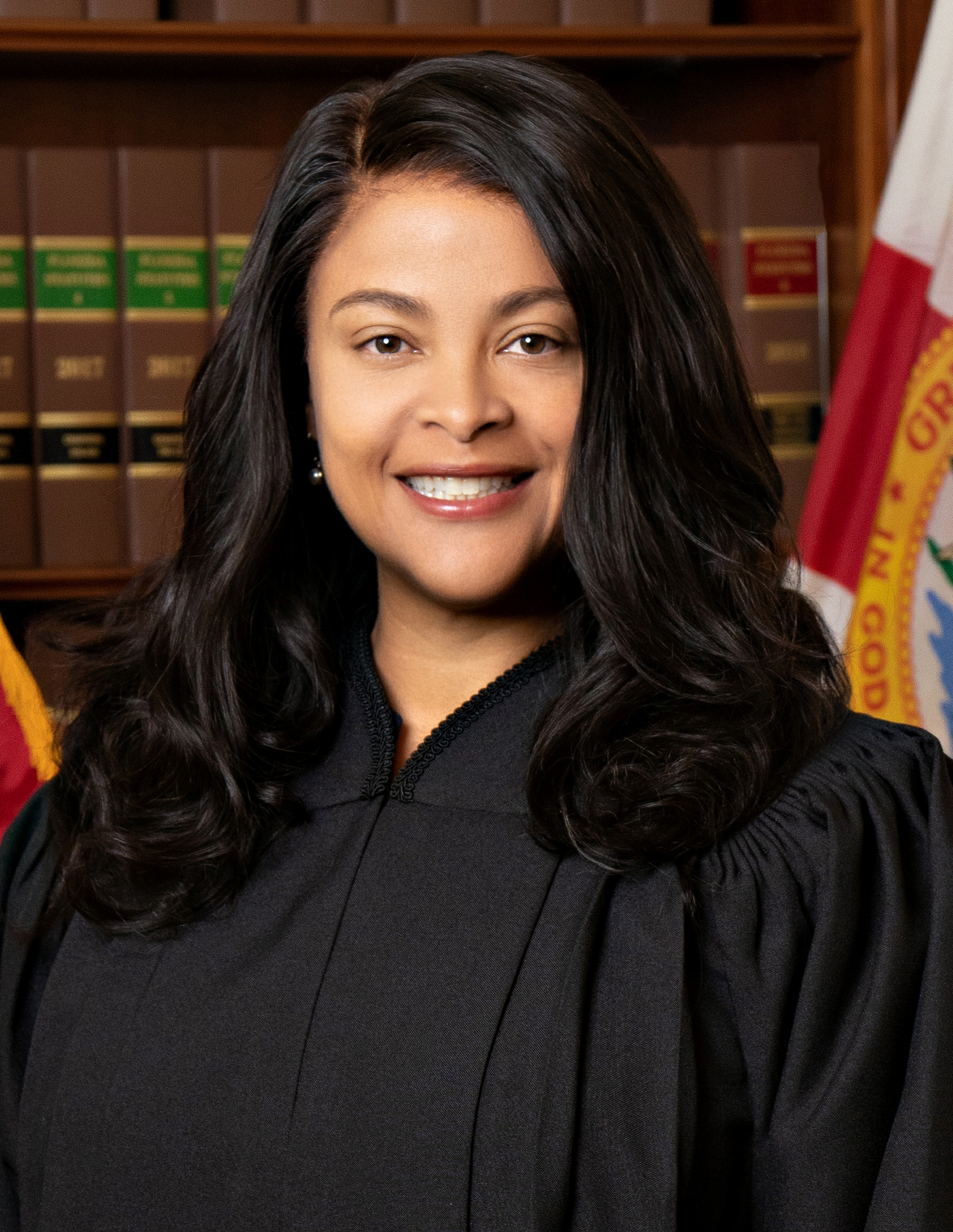
Justice Renatha Francis

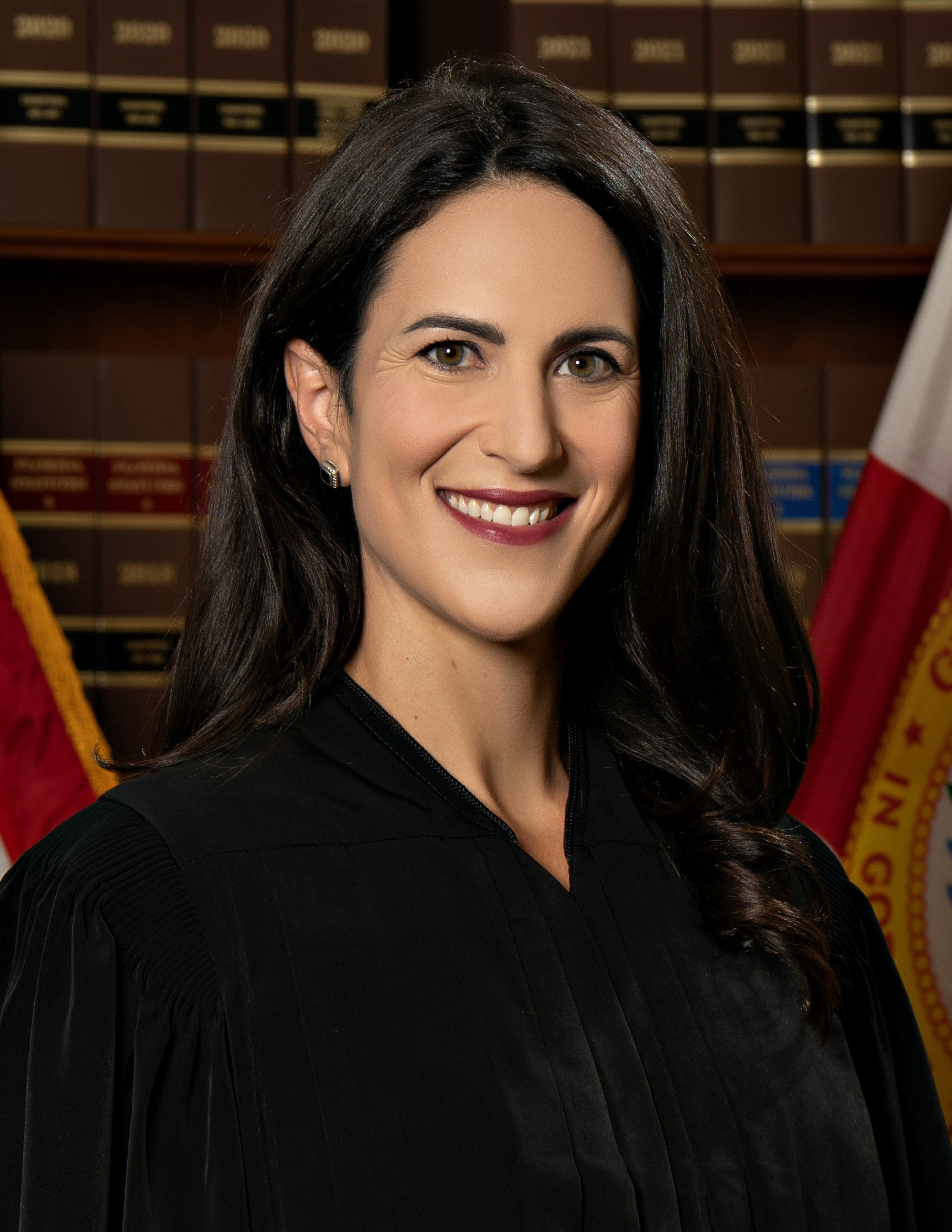
Justice Meredith Barrios

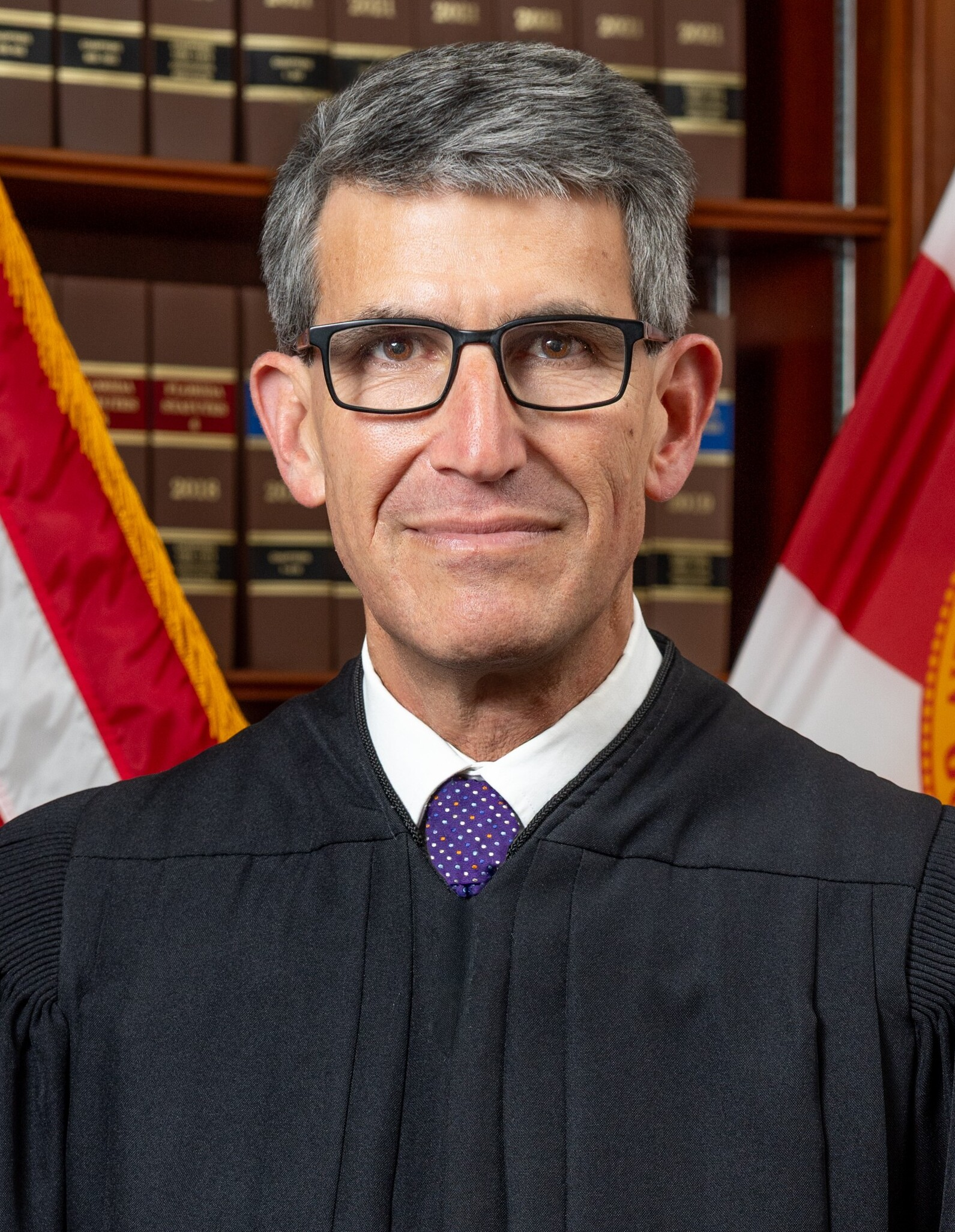
Justice Adam Tanenbaum

== Notable cases and precedent ==
=== State and local cases ===
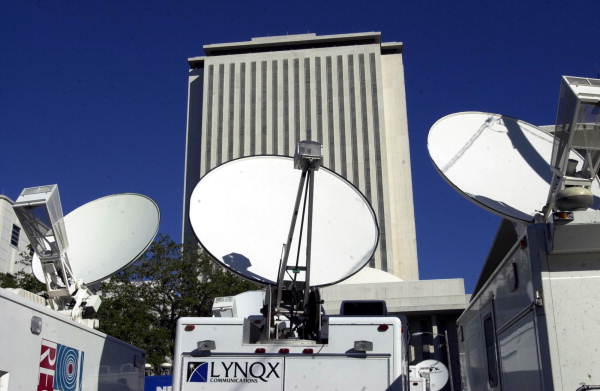
Close-up view of satellite trucks parked at the Florida State Capitol near the Florida Supreme Court during the 2000 presidential election vote dispute

In 1999, a dissenting opinion by Justice Leander J. Shaw Jr. sparked a worldwide debate over the use of Old Sparky, Florida's electric chair, which helped lead to events that caused the Florida Legislature to adopt lethal injection as the state's method of execution only a few months later.

In 2004, the Court struck down another piece of legislation from the Florida Legislature that was designed to reverse a lower court decision in the Terri Schiavo case.

In 2006, the Court struck down a law passed by the Florida Legislature that had created the first statewide education voucher program in the United States. That same year in Engle v. Liggett Group, it also ordered decertification of a class action lawsuit against big tobacco companies that effectively reversed the largest punitive damage jury award, $145 billion, in U.S. history.

In 2013, Governor Rick Scott signed the Timely Justice Act (HB 7101) which overhauled the processes for capital punishment. The United States Supreme Court struck down part of this law in January 2016 in Hurst v. Florida, declaring that a judge determining the aggravating facts to be used in considering a death sentence with only a non-binding recommendation from the jury based on a majority vote was insufficient and violated the Sixth Amendment guarantee of a jury trial. The Florida Legislature passed a new statute to comply with the judgement in March 2016, changing the sentencing method to require a 10-juror supermajority for a sentence of death with a life sentence as the alternative. This new sentencing scheme was struck down by the Florida Supreme Court in a ruling 5–2 in October 2016, which held that a death sentence must be issued by a unanimous jury. The United States Supreme Court later left this decision undisturbed. Governor Scott in early 2017 signed a new law requiring a unanimous jury.

=== 2000 presidential election ===
In the 2000 presidential election controversy, the Supreme Court of the United States overturned the Florida Supreme Court after it had ordered a statewide recount. Notably, arguments before the Florida Supreme Court in the 2000 presidential election cases were the first appellate court proceedings in history broadcast live in their entirety on major television networks in the United States and throughout the world. An estimated one-quarter of the entire fleet of satellite trucks used by broadcasters in North America was present in Tallahassee at the height of the controversy. These events later were dramatized in the 2008 HBO movie Recount.

Former chief justice Charles T. Wells, who presided over the two historic cases argued at the state's highest court, wrote a first-person account of the controversy, Inside Bush v. Gore, published in 2013.

== Library ==
The library of the Florida Supreme Court has been in existence since Florida was granted statehood in 1845. While it is the oldest state-supported library in Florida, its main purpose at the start was to serve the Supreme court. This purpose continues today, with the addition of serving the Office of the State Courts Administrator and lower Florida courts.

When it began, the library clerk was the staff member that handled all reference questions and served as librarian. It was not until 1956, under section 25.341 of the Florida Statutes, that the Supreme Court had a separate librarian administering the library including reference.

The library holds various collections to assist professionals and members of the public. Some examples are court decisions, statutes, regulations, jury instructions, legal periodicals, and treatises, in both print and online format. One interesting fact about these collections is that they do not circulate outside of the building. The Library has an online catalog.

== See also ==
- Florida Constitution
- Government of Florida
- Judiciary of Florida
- List of justices of the Florida Supreme Court
- Florida Democratic Party
- Republican Party of Florida
