= Rivers H. Buford =

American judge (1878–1959)

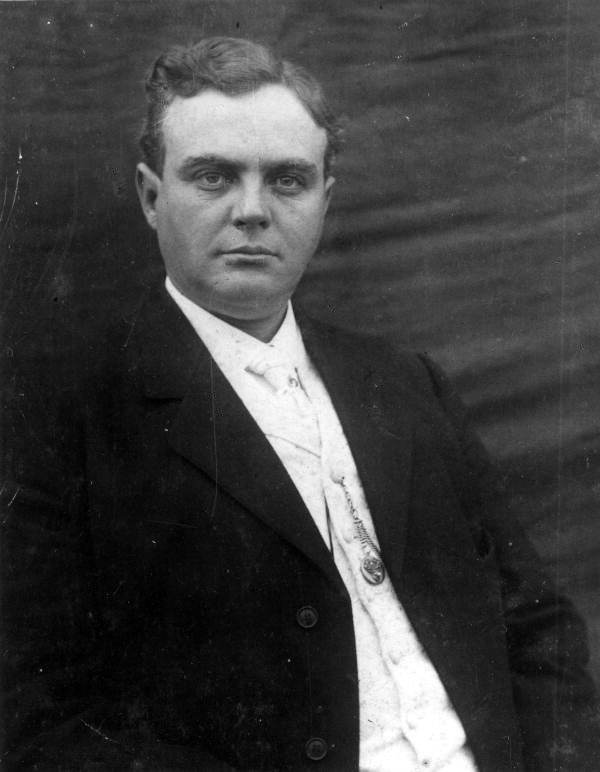

21st Chief Justice of Florida
- In office January 1943 – January 9, 1945
- Preceded by: Armstead Brown
- Succeeded by: Roy H. Chapman
- In office March 5, 1931 – January 10, 1933
- Preceded by: Louie W. Strum
- Succeeded by: Fred H. Davis

Justice of the Supreme Court of Florida
- In office December 4, 1925 – April 3, 1948
- Appointed by: John W. Martin
- Preceded by: Thomas F. West
- Succeeded by: T. Frank Hobson

22nd Florida Attorney General
- In office January 4, 1921 – December 4, 1925
- Governor: Cary A. Hardee
- Preceded by: Van C. Swearingen
- Succeeded by: J. B. Johnson

State Attorney for the Fourteenth Judicial Circuit Court of Florida
- In office 1915–1920
- Governor: Park Trammell; Sidney Johnston Catts

State Attorney for the Ninth Judicial Circuit Court of Florida
- In office 1912–1915
- Governor: Albert W. Gilchrist; Park Trammell

Prosecuting Attorney for Gadsden County
- In office 1909–1911
- Appointed by: Albert W. Gilchrist

Member of the Florida House of Representatives from the Calhoun district
- In office 1901–1902

Personal details
- Born: January 18, 1878 Pulaski, Tennessee, US
- Died: March 17, 1959 (aged 81) Tallahassee, Florida, US
- Party: Democratic
- Spouse(s): Nora Lee Milliken Mary Cornelia Munroe (m. 1904) Mary Hollingsworth
- Children: 6
- Occupation: Attorney

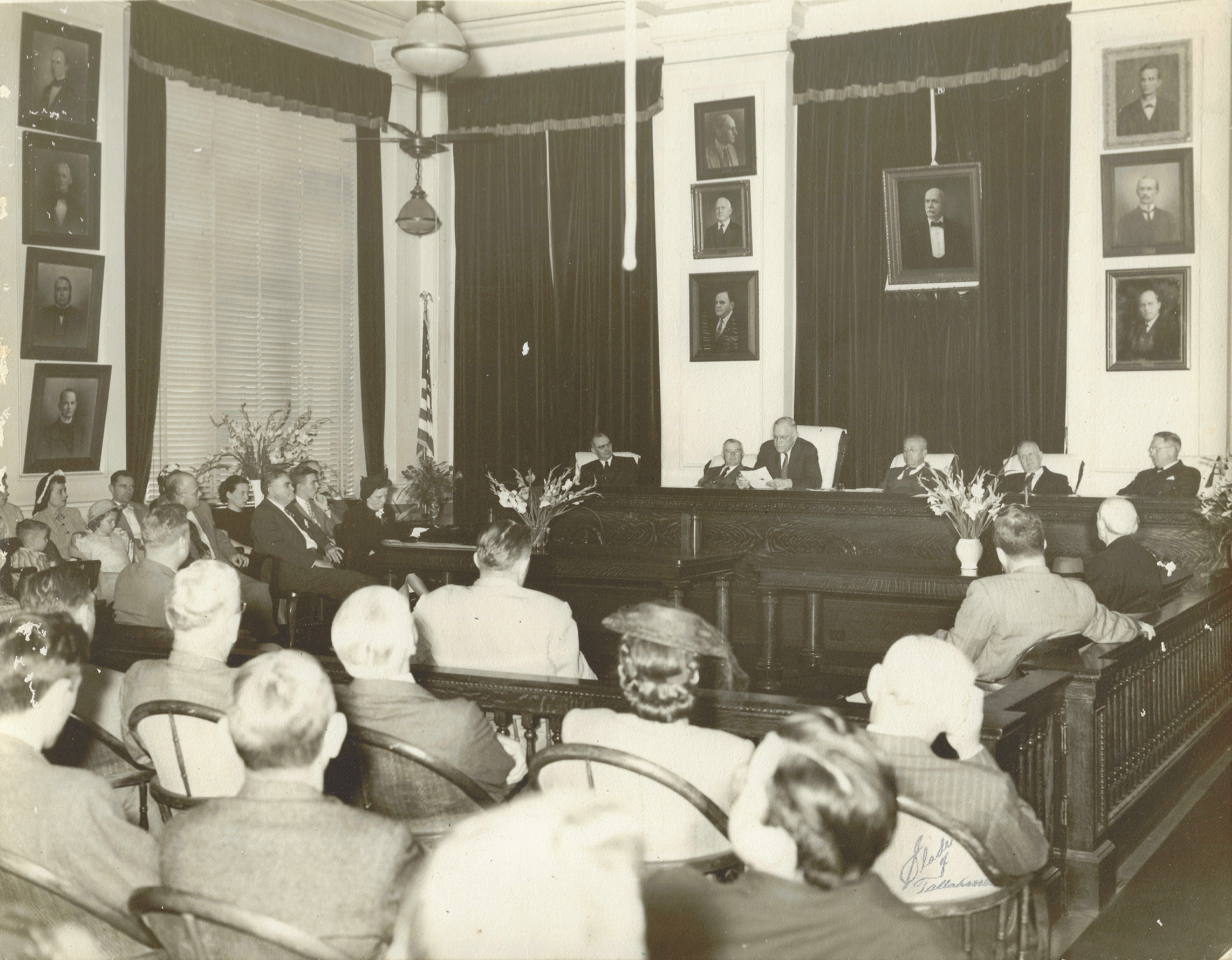
Testimonial upon the retirement of Judge Rivers Buford in the Florida Old Supreme Court Room, Nov. 29 1947. Rivers sits between the viewer and the flowers on the left of the photo.

Rivers Henderson Buford (January 18, 1878 – March 17, 1959) was an American attorney and politician who served twice as the chief justice of the Florida Supreme Court.

== Early life and education ==
Buford was born on January 18, 1878, in Pulaski, Tennessee. Through his mother, Martha Bolling Rivers, Buford is a direct descendant of Pocahontas. Buford lived in Pulaski until 1882, when his father moved the family to Wewahitchka, Florida, at the time in Calhoun County, in order to take a surveying position.

Buford did not have a formal education. He worked as a lumberer until 1894 when he moved to Tallahassee, Florida to read law under attorney Fred T. Myers. Buford was admitted to the Florida Bar in 1900, and he began a private law practice in Blountstown, Florida, the same year.

== Political career ==
In 1901, Buford, still a practicing attorney, was elected to represent Calhoun County in the Florida House of Representatives. He served in this position until 1902, when he moved to Marianna, Florida, in neighboring Jackson County, where he continued his law practice.

In 1909, Florida Governor Albert W. Gilchrist appointed Buford as the prosecuting attorney for nearby Gadsden County, a position he served in until 1911 when he returned to Marianna. In 1912, Buford was elected as the state attorney for Florida's Ninth Judicial Circuit. The circuit court was split up in 1915, and Buford continued to serve as the state attorney, now for the Fourteenth Judicial Circuit.

=== Florida Attorney General ===
In 1920, Buford was elected as the 22nd Florida Attorney General, overseeing a tumultuous period in Floridian law. As a result of World War I cutting off vacation access to the French Rivera, Miami, Florida, was propped up as an alternative due to its similar Mediterranean climate. This led to a land boom, in which numerous planned communities in South Florida, such as Coral Gables and Boca Raton, were created.

As a result of the success brought to South Florida as a result of the land boom, many of the wealthy tourists were at odds with Florida's prohibition laws, put in place by Buford's predecessor Van C. Swearingen. It was particularly difficult to enforce prohibition in South Florida due to rum runners operating out of nearby Cuba and The Bahamas. These rum runners often had the support of the wealthy Northern tourists who frequented Miami in the summer.

While South Florida was prospering during Buford's tenure, the same could not be said for North Florida and Central Florida, both of which struggled with increased racial tensions and the rise of the Second Ku Klux Klan. Buford turned a blind eye to the lynchings and burnings that occurred during the Perry massacre and the Rosewood massacre. Additionally, he chose not to investigate the Ocoee massacre, which occurred at the end of Swearingen's term.

Buford also did little to stop the abuse of migrant workers, who worked for only a few dollars a week in the tropical sun. These workers were housed in derelict company towns, which often lacked schools and hospitals. These company towns also gave way to the rise of jook-joints, dance halls which were usually the only form of recreation in those towns.

In 1925, Buford, with the aid of the United States Coast Guard, heavily restricted the ability for rum runners to safely operate in South Florida. This, coupled with devastating hurricanes and high land prices, led to a real estate market crash, wherein no new customers were arriving, and current landowners were being forced to sell their land for little profit.

=== Florida Supreme Court ===
Despite Buford's disastrous reputation in hindsight, at the time he remained a popular figure in Floridian political circles, culminating in his appointment to the Florida Supreme Court on December 4, 1925, by Governor John W. Martin. While on the court, Buford was twice elected Chief Justice, serving from 1931 until 1933, and from 1943 until 1945.

Buford was noted for his colorful personality, and he was praised as one of the court's finest minds. Widely admired for his skill as a public speaker, Buford holds the record for the most opinions published in the Florida Supreme Court, having delivered 2,657 different opinions.

Buford, swearing he would never wear a black robe, retired from the court on April 3, 1948, shortly before the robes were introduced. He pursued real estate in Tallahassee after his retirement.

== Personal life and death ==
Buford married Nora Lee Milliken. They had no children. He later married Mary Cornelia Munroe, the daughter of a physician from Quincy, Florida. Buford and Munroe had five children together.

After Munroe's death in 1924, Buford married Mary Hollingsworth. They had one child together, also named Rivers Henderson Buford, Jr., in 1927. The young Buford would go on to become a successful attorney. He died in 2016.

Buford was a Freemason, and was a member of the Morocco Temple in Jacksonville, Florida.

Buford died in Tallahassee on March 17, 1959.
