= 1936 United States presidential election in Florida =

- November 8, 1936

Nominee	Franklin D. Roosevelt	Alf Landon
Party	Democratic	Republican
Home state	New York	Kansas
Running mate	John Nance Garner	Frank Knox
Electoral vote	7	0
Popular vote	249,117	78,248
Percentage	76.08%	23.90%
County results
Roosevelt
50–60%
60–70%
70–80%
80–90%
90–100%
President before election
Franklin D. Roosevelt
Democratic
Elected President
Franklin D. Roosevelt
Democratic

The 1936 United States presidential election in Florida was held on November 8, 1936. Florida voters chose seven electors, or representatives to the Electoral College, who voted for president and vice president.

Ever since the disfranchisement of blacks at the beginning of the 1890s, Florida had been a one-party state ruled by the Democratic Party. The disfranchisement of blacks and poor whites by poll taxes in 1889 had left the Republican Party – between 1872 and 1888 dependent upon black votes – virtually extinct.

With the single exception of William Howard Taft's win in Calhoun County in 1908 the Democratic Party won every county in Florida in every presidential election from 1892 (Note: In the 1892 presidential election, Republican Benjamin Harrison was not on the ballot and the party backed Populist James B. Weaver.) until 1916. Only twice – and never for more than one term – did any Republican serve in either house of the state legislature between 1896 and 1928. Despite this Democratic dominance and the restrictions on the franchise of the poorer classes due to the poll tax, significant socialist movements were to develop and persist in Tampa and to a lesser extent over other parts of the state, especially against the powerful Ku Klux Klan. There was also a powerful Prohibitionist movements in older North Florida, which saw the Prohibition Party even win the governorship for one term under the notorious anti-Catholic minister Sidney J. Catts.

The 1920s saw the GOP increase its vote totals above those from traditional Unionists (which Florida entirely lacked) in Texas, Arkansas, Alabama or Georgia, aided by a growing "Presidential Republican" vote in southern Florida from migrants from northern states. In 1928, Florida, especially the western Panhandle pineywoods, turned dramatically away from the Democratic Party due to the nomination of Catholic Al Smith, with the result that Herbert Hoover became the first Republican to win a statewide election since the end of Reconstruction. However, the Depression and elimination of anti-Catholicism saw a return to normal overwhelming Democratic dominance in 1932. Despite this, Hoover's gains in newer South and Central Florida were not completely lost, as Republicans still managed 40% of the vote in Osceola, Charlotte, and Pinellas counties, all of which were beginning to see large-scale migration from historically Republican Northern states.

In 1932, Florida would elect David Sholtz as governor who was closely allied with President Roosevelt and strongly in favor of the New Deal. He would even fashion himself politically in a manner that was similar to Roosevelt. Roosevelt would face an assassination attempt in Miami's Bayfront Park in February 1933. Roosevelt would visit Florida on March 23, 1936, going to Rollins College in Winter Park to do a ceremony there. The event would attract sizable crowds and it is believed the presidential election occurring in November would be a sizable motivator for his trip. It was estimated that 75,000 to 100,000 people would watch the motorcade that ended up driving for 10 miles and David Sholtz would ride alongside him.

A number of conservative Southern newspapers – in Florida, the Jacksonville Times-Union – were opposed to Roosevelt and despite the extreme historical hostility towards the GOP, supported Republican nominee Alf Landon in all but name. Nonetheless, a combination of powerful political funding of the Democratic Party from textile and other businesses, and support for FDR's New Deal in the anti-Smith pineywoods, meant that Landon had no hope of making any gains on Herbert Hoover's performance in 1932. Incumbent President Roosevelt won by 170,869 votes or 52.18%, carrying as in 1932 every county in the state. Roosevelt's 76.08% is the second-best ever Democratic performance in Florida behind only Grover Cleveland's 1892 performance and the best ever Democratic performance for a Democrat with a Republican opponent.

== Democratic primary ==
Florida held a presidential primary for the Democratic Party on June 2, 1936. Roosevelt won most of the vote in every county in Florida.

Candidate	Number of votes	%
Franklin D. Roosevelt	242,982	89.67%
Joseph Coutremarsh	27,982	10.33%
Total	270,964	100%

== Results ==
Electoral results
Presidential candidate	Party	Home state	Popular vote		Electoral vote	Running mate		
Presidential candidate	Party	Home state	Count	Percentage	Electoral vote	Vice-presidential candidate	Home state	Electoral vote
Franklin D. Roosevelt	Democratic	New York	249,117	76.08%	7	John Nance Garner	Texas	7
Alf Landon	Republican	Kansas	78,248	23.90%	0	Frank Knox	Illinois	0
Write-ins	—	—	56	0.02%	0	—	—	0
Norman Thomas	Socialist	New York	9	0.00%	0	George A. Nelson	Wisconsin	0
William Lemke	Write-in	North Dakota	1	0.00%	0	Thomas C. O'Brien	Massachusetts	0
Earl Browder	Write-in	—	1	0.00%	0	James W. Ford	New York	0
Total			327,436	100%	7			7
Needed to win					266			266

=== Results by county ===
County	Franklin D. Roosevelt Democratic		Alf Landon Republican		Various candidates Other parties		Margin		Total votes cast
County	#	%	#	%	#	%	#	%	Total votes cast
Alachua	4,788	84.33%	890	15.67%			3,898	68.65%	5,678
Baker	1,555	93.06%	116	6.94%			1,439	86.12%	1,671
Bay	3,202	85.55%	541	14.45%			2,661	71.09%	3,743
Bradford	1,494	83.60%	293	16.40%			1,201	67.21%	1,787
Brevard	2,300	66.72%	1,147	33.28%			1,153	33.45%	3,447
Broward	4,385	69.70%	1,906	30.30%			2,479	39.41%	6,291
Calhoun	1,043	85.21%	181	14.79%			862	70.42%	1,224
Charlotte	782	58.80%	548	41.20%			234	17.59%	1,330
Citrus	1,366	89.57%	159	10.43%			1,207	79.15%	1,525
Clay	1,251	69.00%	562	31.00%			689	38.00%	1,813
Collier	902	91.11%	88	8.89%			814	82.22%	990
Columbia	2,783	93.42%	196	6.58%			2,587	86.84%	2,979
Dade	28,007	73.08%	10,295	26.86%	21	0.05%	17,712	46.22%	38,323
DeSoto	1,594	74.00%	560	26.00%			1,034	48.00%	2,154
Dixie	1,170	94.81%	64	5.19%			1,106	89.63%	1,234
Duval	25,989	82.88%	5,368	17.12%			20,621	65.76%	31,357
Escambia	9,138	85.36%	1,567	14.64%			7,571	70.72%	10,705
Flagler	507	82.71%	106	17.29%			401	65.42%	613
Franklin	1,413	91.87%	125	8.13%			1,288	83.75%	1,538
Gadsden	2,572	92.85%	198	7.15%			2,374	85.70%	2,770
Gilchrist	836	93.72%	56	6.28%			780	87.44%	892
Glades	523	69.00%	235	31.00%			288	37.99%	758
Gulf	844	92.24%	71	7.76%			773	84.48%	915
Hamilton	1,554	95.51%	73	4.49%			1,481	91.03%	1,627
Hardee	2,142	71.73%	844	28.27%			1,298	43.47%	2,986
Hendry	741	76.00%	234	24.00%			507	52.00%	975
Hernando	1,115	78.08%	313	21.92%			802	56.16%	1,428
Highlands	1,898	68.97%	842	30.60%	12	0.44%	1,056	38.37%	2,752
Hillsborough	20,202	79.03%	5,361	20.97%			14,841	58.06%	25,563
Holmes	3,213	80.63%	772	19.37%			2,441	61.25%	3,985
Indian River	1,270	70.48%	532	29.52%			738	40.95%	1,802
Jackson	3,757	91.46%	351	8.54%			3,406	82.91%	4,108
Jefferson	1,243	90.73%	127	9.27%			1,116	81.46%	1,370
Lafayette	1,084	93.13%	80	6.87%			1,004	86.25%	1,164
Lake	4,045	66.53%	2,034	33.45%	1	0.02%	2,011	33.08%	6,080
Lee	2,549	69.12%	1,137	30.83%	2	0.05%	1,412	38.29%	3,688
Leon	3,770	93.16%	277	6.84%			3,493	86.31%	4,047
Levy	2,003	91.63%	183	8.37%			1,820	83.26%	2,186
Liberty	800	92.59%	64	7.41%			736	85.19%	864
Madison	2,278	92.53%	184	7.47%			2,094	85.05%	2,462
Manatee	3,487	70.56%	1,455	29.44%			2,032	41.12%	4,942
Marion	4,664	85.99%	760	14.01%			3,904	71.98%	5,424
Martin	778	70.41%	327	29.59%			451	40.81%	1,105
Monroe	2,605	90.23%	282	9.77%			2,323	80.46%	2,887
Nassau	1,095	81.90%	242	18.10%			853	63.80%	1,337
Okaloosa	2,433	84.19%	457	15.81%			1,976	68.37%	2,890
Okeechobee	655	77.88%	186	22.12%			469	55.77%	841
Orange	7,314	62.42%	4,394	37.50%	9	0.08%	2,920	24.92%	11,717
Osceola	1,622	59.57%	1,101	40.43%			521	19.13%	2,723
Palm Beach	9,635	68.25%	4,478	31.72%	4	0.03%	5,157	36.53%	14,117
Pasco	2,229	65.79%	1,159	34.21%			1,070	31.58%	3,388
Pinellas	12,072	59.57%	8,183	40.38%	10	0.05%	3,889	19.19%	20,265
Polk	10,441	71.45%	4,164	28.49%	9	0.06%	6,277	42.95%	14,614
Putnam	2,709	73.53%	975	26.47%			1,734	47.07%	3,684
St. John's	3,411	75.87%	1,085	24.13%			2,326	51.73%	4,496
St. Lucie	1,946	79.66%	497	20.34%			1,449	59.31%	2,443
Santa Rosa	2,934	79.77%	744	20.23%			2,190	59.54%	3,678
Sarasota	2,418	69.62%	1,055	30.38%			1,363	39.25%	3,473
Seminole	2,580	74.20%	897	25.80%			1,683	48.40%	3,477
Sumter	1,724	70.14%	734	29.86%			990	40.28%	2,458
Suwannee	2,863	93.41%	202	6.59%			2,661	86.82%	3,065
Taylor	1,897	93.73%	127	6.27%			1,770	87.45%	2,024
Union	1,089	92.44%	89	7.56%			1,000	84.89%	1,178
Volusia	7,924	61.63%	4,934	38.37%			2,990	23.25%	12,858
Wakulla	1,417	96.92%	45	3.08%			1,372	93.84%	1,462
Walton	2,778	84.49%	510	15.51%			2,268	68.98%	3,288
Washington	2,289	82.40%	486	17.49%	3	0.11%	1,803	64.90%	2,778
Totals	249,117	76.08%	78,248	23.90%	71	0.02%	170,869	52.18%	327,436
