= Thomas F. West =

American judge (1874–1931)

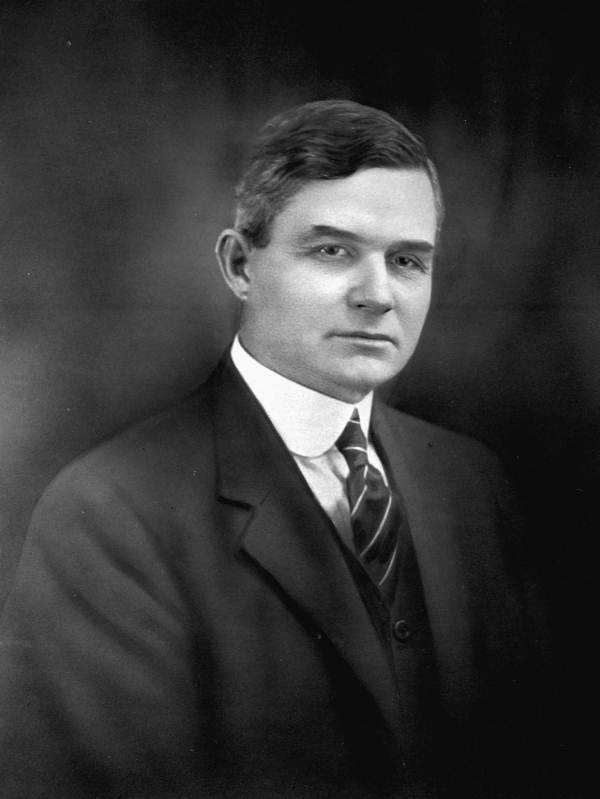

Judge of the First Judicial Circuit Court of Florida
- In office December 3, 1925 – February 23, 1931
- Appointed by: John W. Martin

Chief Justice of the Supreme Court of Florida
- In office February 28, 1923 – December 3, 1925
- Preceded by: R. Fenwick Taylor
- Succeeded by: Armstead Brown

Justice of the Supreme Court of Florida
- In office September 1, 1917 – December 3, 1925
- Appointed by: Sidney Johnston Catts
- Preceded by: Thomas M. Shackleford
- Succeeded by: Rivers H. Buford

President of the Florida Bar
- In office 1915–1916
- Preceded by: W. H. Price
- Succeeded by: Nathan Philemon Bryan

20th Florida Attorney General
- In office January 7, 1913 – September 1, 1917
- Governor: Park Trammell; Sidney Johnston Catts
- Preceded by: Park Trammell
- Succeeded by: Van C. Swearingen

Member of the Florida Senate from the Santa Rosa district
- In office 1904–1912

Member of the Florida House of Representatives from the Santa Rosa district
- In office 1902–1904

Personal details
- Born: November 23, 1874 Milton, Florida, U.S.
- Died: February 23, 1931 (aged 56) Pensacola, Florida, U.S.
- Party: Democratic
- Spouse: Alma Chaffin
- Children: 2
- Education: Washington and Lee College
- Occupation: Attorney

Thomas Franklin West (November 23, 1874 – February 23, 1931) was an American attorney and politician from the state of Florida. West served as a justice on the Florida Supreme Court.

== Early life and education ==
West was born on November 23, 1874, in Milton, Florida. He attended Washington and Lee College in Virginia, graduating with a law degree in 1899. The following year, West was admitted into the Florida Bar, and began a private practice in Milton.

== Political career ==
=== Florida Legislature ===
West, a Democrat, was elected to the Florida House of Representatives in 1902, representing Santa Rosa County. In 1903, Governor William Sherman Jennings appointed him to the commission tasked with revising the state's statutes.

He served until 1904, when he was elected to the Florida Senate for the same county. In 1905, he introduced the original plans for the drainage of the Everglades, aided by Governor Napoleon B. Broward.

While in the state senate, West also worked with the Governor Albert W. Gilchrist, a progressive Democrat, to propose an amendment to the Florida Constitution which called for the adoption of two popular Progressive Era reforms, the initiative and referendum. The proposition, designated as House Joint Resolution 222, easily passed both chambers of the Florida Legislature, despite the protest of the conservative minority. In 1912, however, anti-progressives were able to legally prevent the amendment from appearing on the ballot that year.

=== Florida Attorney General ===
West served in the Florida Senate for two terms until he was elected Florida Attorney General in 1912. During his tenure, West most notably oversaw two tax-related cases: one brought by the Pullman Company arguing against the taxation of sleeping car companies, and the other, Rast v. Van Demis and Lewis Company (1916), arguing against licensing taxes. Both cases were ruled in favor of the taxes. In 1915, West did not accept an appointment to Florida's First Circuit Court opting to run for reelection in 1916 instead.

West additionally served as the President of the Florida Bar from 1915 until 1916.

In the 1916 Florida gubernatorial election, West refused to endorse the Democratic candidate, former Florida Treasurer William V. Knott, claiming he was dishonest and had no regard for the law. West instead endorsed the Prohibition candidate, pastor Sidney Johnson Catts, who had initially run for the Democratic nomination, losing to Knott in the primary. Catts defeated Knott by over 9,000 votes, becoming one of two elected Prohibition candidates, alongside Charles Hiram Randall, a U.S. Representative from California. West was reelected in the same election cycle.

=== Later career ===
As thanks for his endorsement, Catts appointed West to the Florida Supreme Court on September 1, 1917, after the resignation of Justice Thomas M. Shackleford. West was selected as Chief Justice by the court on February 28, 1923, and served in that position until December 3, 1925, when he was appointed by Governor John W. Martin to Florida's First Judicial Circuit Court, the same position he refused a decade prior.

== Personal life and death ==
West married fellow Floridian Alma Chaffin.

West worked as a judge until the day of his death, dying from influenza in Pensacola, Florida, on February 23, 1931.
