= J. B. Johnson (Florida politician) =

American politician

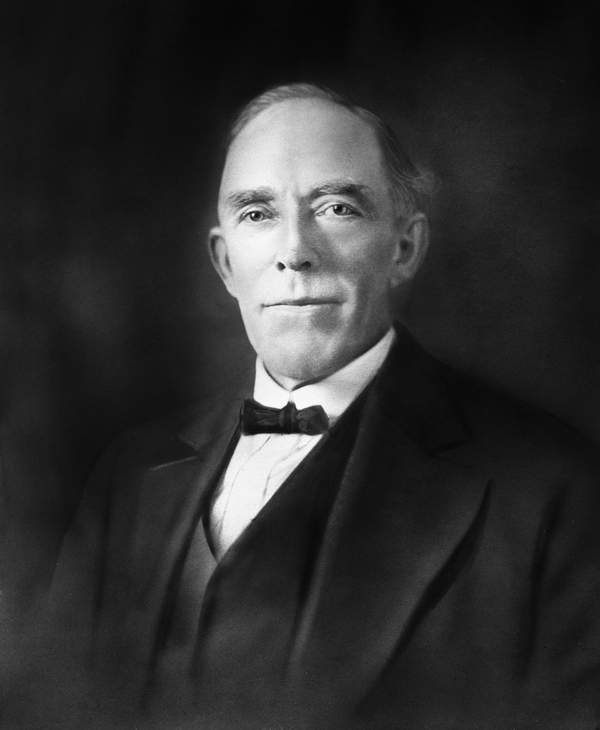

Judge of the Second Judicial Circuit Court of Florida
- In office June 4, 1927 – ?
- Appointed by: John W. Martin

23rd Florida Attorney General
- In office December 4, 1925 – June 4, 1927
- Governor: John W. Martin
- Preceded by: Rivers Buford
- Succeeded by: Fred Henry Davis

28th President of the Florida Senate
- In office 1917–1917
- Preceded by: Cary A. Hardee
- Succeeded by: Cary A. Hardee

Personal details
- Born: October 15, 1868 Live Oak, Florida, U.S.
- Died: June 26, 1940 (aged 71) Live Oak, Florida, U.S.
- Party: Democratic
- Spouse: Mary Wagner (m. 1902; died 1923)
- Occupation: Attorney

Military service
- Allegiance: United States of America
- Branch/service: Florida Army National Guard
- Years of service: 1898
- Rank: First Sergeant
- Unit: 1st Florida Volunteer Infantry Regiment
- Battles/wars: Spanish–American War

John B. Johnson (October 15, 1868 – June 26, 1940), more commonly referred to as J. B. Johnson, was an American attorney and politician who served as the 23rd Florida Attorney General.

== Early life and military service ==
Johnson was born in Live Oak, Florida, on October 15, 1868. On April 23, 1898, Johnson enlisted in the United States Army during the Spanish–American War. He served as a first sergeant in Company L of the 1st Florida Infantry. His regiment did not see any combat, remaining in Tampa, Florida, and later Huntsville, Alabama, for the majority of the war. Johnson was mustered out of the Army on December 3, 1898.

Educated in local schools, Johnson was admitted to the Florida Bar in 1903, and began a private practice in Live Oak.

== Political career ==
In 1907, Johnson, a Democrat, was elected as the mayor of Live Oak. He was simultaneously elected to the Florida Senate, representing District 27, which encompassed Suwanee County. While in the senate, Johnson opposed legislature regulating child labor, and, as a fervent Methodist, he was a supporter of women's suffrage.

In 1913, Johnson was appointed for a one-year term as the President pro tempore of the Florida Senate by Senate President Ion L. Farris, and later in 1917, he would become the President of the Florida Senate, serving for only that year. Johnson did not seek reelection to either the senate or the mayoral office in 1922, opting to return to private practice.

In 1925, Johnson was appointed as the 23rd Florida Attorney General by newly elected Governor John W. Martin, succeeding Rivers Buford, who Martin had appointed to the Florida Supreme Court. Johnson served as the Florida Attorney General until Martin appointed him as the judge of the Second Judicial Circuit Court of Florida.

== Personal life and death ==
Johnson died in Live Oak on June 26, 1940. Johnson was married to Mary Wagner on 1902. They were married until her death in 1923 and had two children with her: Wagner B. and John Paul.

Johnson was a member of the Freemasons.
