= 1924 Florida gubernatorial election =

- November 4, 1924
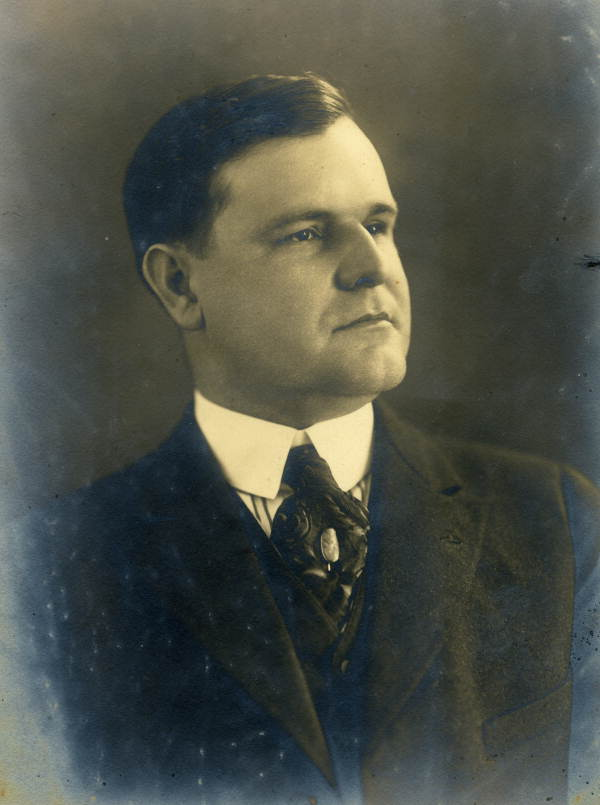

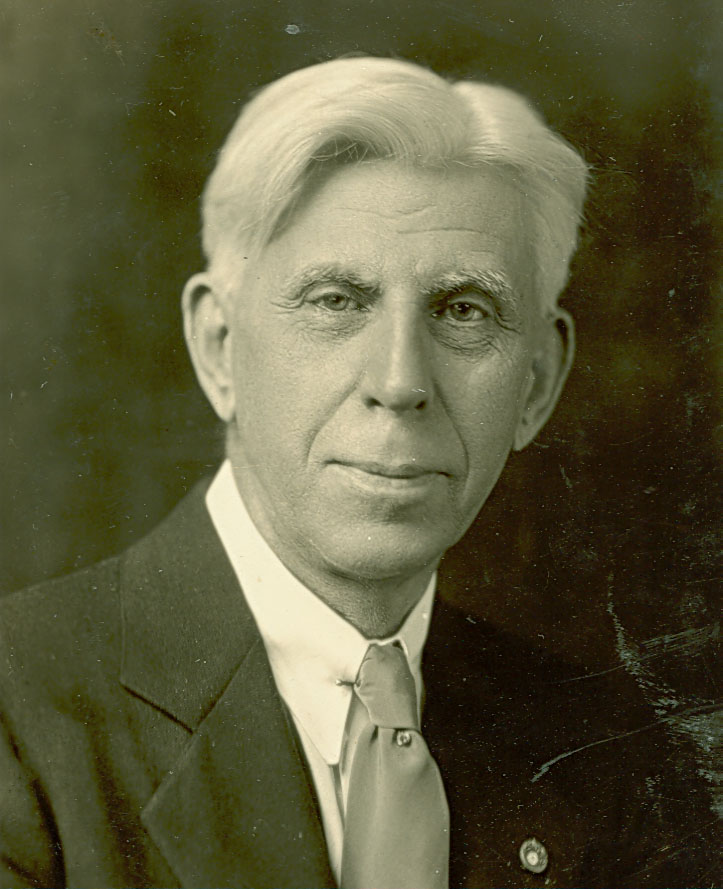
Nominee	John W. Martin	William R. O'Neal
Party	Democratic	Republican
Popular vote	84,181	17,499
Percentage	82.79%	17.21%
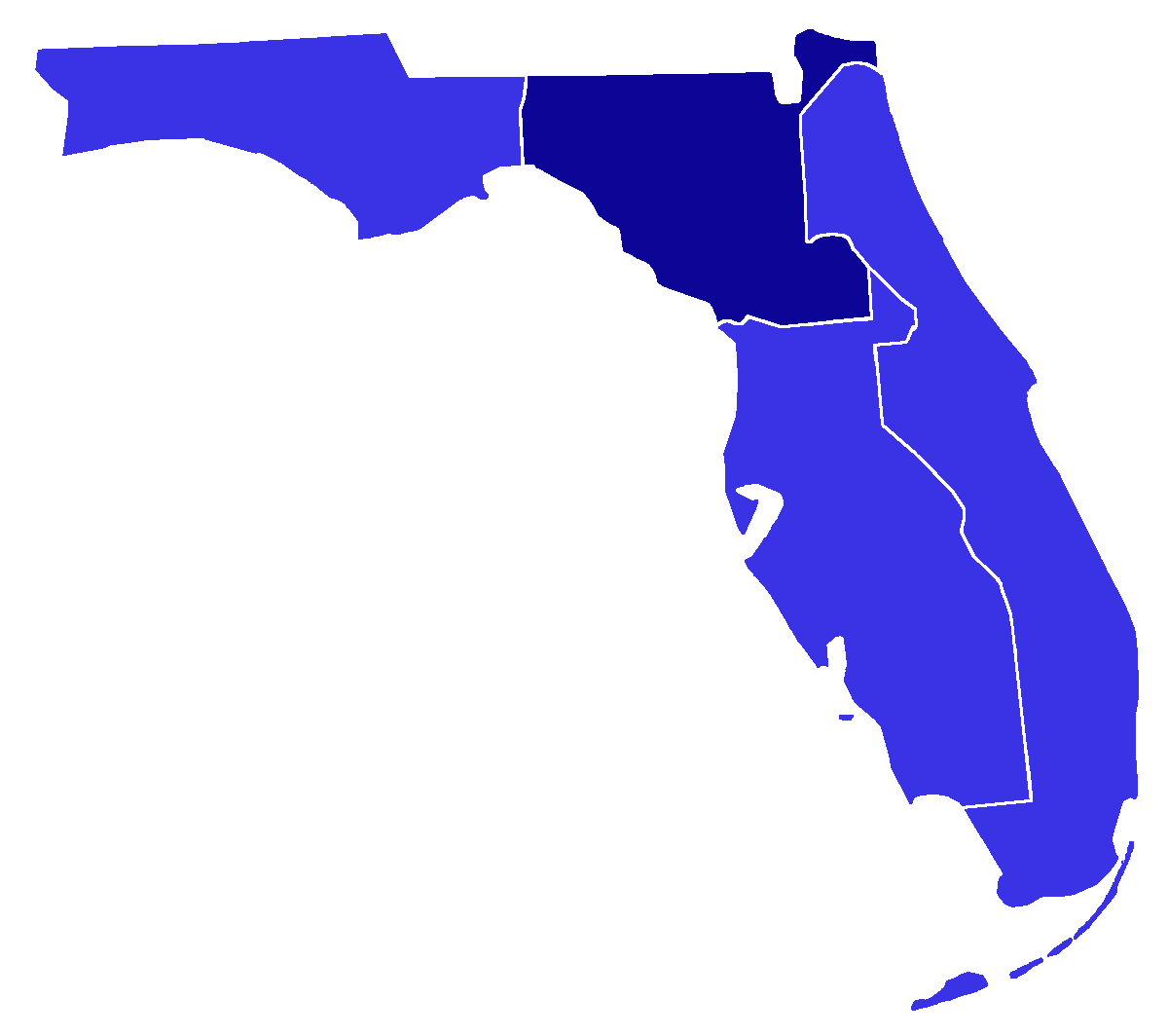
- Martin: 60–70% 70–80% 80–90% >90%
Governor before election
Cary A. Hardee
Democratic
Elected Governor
John W. Martin
Democratic

The 1924 Florida gubernatorial election was held on November 4, 1924. Democratic nominee John W. Martin defeated Republican nominee William R. O'Neal with 82.79% of the vote.

== Primary elections ==
Primary elections were held on June 3, 1924.

=== Democratic primary ===
==== Candidates ====
- John W. Martin, former Mayor of Jacksonville
- Sidney Johnston Catts, former Governor
- Frank E. Jennings, former Speaker of the State House of Representatives
- Worth W. Trammell, former State Representative
- Charles H. Spencer

==== Results ====
Democratic primary results
Party	Candidate	Votes	%
Democratic	John W. Martin	55,715	37.98
Democratic	Sidney Johnston Catts	43,230	29.47
Democratic	Frank E. Jennings	37,962	25.88
Democratic	Worth W. Trammell	8,381	5.71
Democratic	Charles H. Spencer	1,408	0.96
Total votes		146,696	100.00

== General election ==
=== Candidates ===
- John W. Martin, Democratic
- William R. O'Neal, Republican, businessman, trustee of Rollins College, president of the Orlando City Council, anti-racism activist.

=== Results ===
1924 Florida gubernatorial election
Party	Candidate	Votes	%	±%
Democratic	John W. Martin	84,181	82.79%	
Republican	William R. O'Neal	17,499	17.21%	
Majority		66,682		
Turnout				
Democratic hold		Swing		

==== County Results ====
County	John W. Martin Democratic		William R. O'Neal Republican		Totals
County	#	%	#	%	Totals
Alachua	2,345	87.70%	329	12.30%	2,674
Baker	352	84.41%	65	15.59%	417
Bay	1,014	84.29%	189	15.71%	1,203
Bradford	582	90.09%	64	9.91%	646
Brevard	1,257	80.47%	305	19.53%	1,562
Broward	690	75.16%	228	24.84%	918
Calhoun	464	93.36%	33	6.64%	497
Charlotte	352	81.11%	82	18.89%	434
Citrus	450	94.14%	28	5.86%	478
Clay	420	82.84%	87	17.16%	507
Collier	201	97.10%	6	2.90%	207
Columbia	822	93.62%	56	6.38%	878
Dade	5,753	80.39%	1,403	19.61%	7,156
DeSoto	745	85.14%	130	14.86%	875
Dixie	285	97.94%	6	2.06%	291
Duval	8,779	82.31%	1,887	17.69%	10,666
Escambia	3,313	86.73%	507	13.27%	3,820
Flagler	347	88.52%	45	11.48%	392
Franklin	419	88.77%	53	11.23%	472
Gadsden	736	95.09%	38	4.91%	774
Glades	296	84.09%	56	15.91%	352
Hamilton	709	86.78%	108	13.22%	817
Hardee	878	82.67%	184	17.33%	1,062
Hendry	149	91.98%	13	8.02%	162
Hernando	342	90.24%	37	9.76%	379
Highlands	641	85.58%	108	14.42%	749
Hillsborough	6,269	87.06%	932	12.94%	7,201
Holmes	886	78.06%	249	21.94%	1,135
Jackson	1,812	88.26%	241	11.74%	2,053
Jefferson	606	95.28%	30	4.72%	636
Lafayette	372	95.88%	16	4.12%	388
Lake	1,901	75.38%	621	24.62%	2,522
Lee	1,144	88.20%	153	11.80%	1,297
Leon	1,046	94.40%	62	5.60%	1,108
Levy	670	87.01%	100	12.99%	770
Liberty	242	94.90%	13	5.10%	255
Madison	537	95.89%	23	4.11%	560
Manatee	1,570	83.11%	319	16.89%	1,889
Marion	1,757	89.96%	196	10.04%	1,953
Monroe	1,108	90.75%	113	9.25%	1,221
Nassau	667	92.90%	51	7.10%	718
Okaloosa	769	85.16%	134	14.84%	903
Okeechobee	269	90.57%	28	9.43%	297
Orange	2,701	69.22%	1,201	30.78%	3,902
Osceola	1,313	70.59%	547	29.41%	1,860
Palm Beach	2,947	79.03%	782	20.97%	3,729
Pasco	1,019	73.84%	361	26.16%	1,380
Pinellas	3,776	66.27%	1,922	33.73%	5,698
Polk	4,173	82.28%	899	17.72%	5,072
Putnam	1,243	82.54%	263	17.46%	1,506
Santa Rosa	836	92.27%	70	7.73%	906
Sarasota	497	85.54%	84	14.46%	581
Seminole	1,334	81.94%	294	18.06%	1,628
St. Johns	1,676	88.72%	213	11.28%	1,889
St. Lucie	1,210	81.54%	274	18.46%	1,484
Sumter	571	89.22%	69	10.78%	640
Suwannee	1,080	93.99%	69	6.01%	1,149
Taylor	533	91.11%	52	8.89%	585
Union	340	94.97%	18	5.03%	358
Volusia	3,025	79.96%	758	20.04%	3,783
Wakulla	359	92.53%	29	7.47%	388
Walton	903	87.25%	132	12.75%	1,035
Washington	679	83.52%	134	16.48%	813
Total	84,181	82.79%	17,499	17.21%	101,680
