= Van C. Swearingen =

American lawyer and politician (1873–1943)

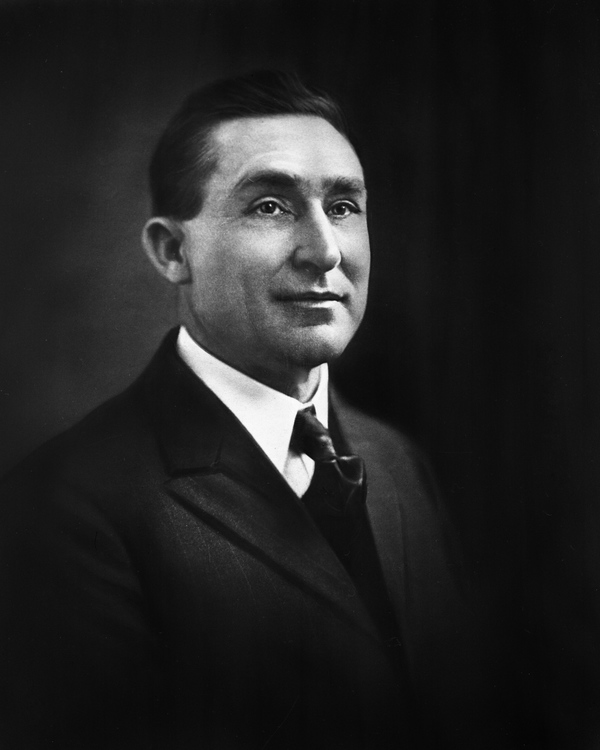

21st Florida Attorney General
- In office September 1, 1917 – January 4, 1921
- Governor: Sidney Johnston Catts
- Preceded by: Thomas F. West
- Succeeded by: Rivers Buford

30th Mayor of Jacksonville
- In office 1913–1915
- Preceded by: William S. Jordan
- Succeeded by: J. E. T. Bowden

Judge of the Municipal Court of Jacksonville, Florida
- In office 1911–1913
- Appointed by: Albert W. Gilchrist

Personal details
- Born: February 2, 1873 Nassau County, Florida, U.S.
- Died: March 3, 1943 (aged 70) Miami, Florida, U.S.
- Political party: Democratic
- Spouse: Alice Padgett (m. 1899)
- Children: 6
- Education: Mercer University (LL.B)
- Occupation: Attorney

Van Cicero Swearingen (February 2, 1873 – March 3, 1943) was an American attorney and politician who served as the 21st Florida Attorney General, serving from 1917 until 1921.

== Early life and education ==
Swearingen was born on February 2, 1873, in Nassau County, Florida. After being educated in local schools, Swearingen attended Mercer University in Macon, Georgia, graduating with his Bachelor of Laws degree in 1899. After graduating, he moved to Jacksonville, Florida, and began a private practice.

== Political career ==
=== Mayor of Jacksonville ===
In 1911, Governor Albert W. Gilchrist appointed Swearingen, a Democrat, to Jacksonville's municipal court. He served on the court until 1913, when he successfully ran for mayor of Jacksonville, defeating Socialist Thomas W. Cox with over 92% of the vote. As mayor, Swearingen began cracking down on vice, closing the bordellos and keeping minors out of pool halls. This struck a nerve with many in Jacksonville who saw value in the city's red light district. Swearingen even used spies in the form of undercover police officers to help find hidden bordellos.

Swearingen sought reelection in 1915, though he faced three challengers in the Democratic primary: businessman Rudolph Grunthal, physician Charles Johnson, and former mayor J. E. T. Bowden. Though Swearingen came in first during the first round of the primary, he was defeated in the runoff by Bowden, receiving just 41.5% of the vote. Bowden would go on to win in the general election, defeating Socialist I. C. Baldwin.

=== Florida Attorney General ===
In 1917, newly elected Governor Sidney Johnston Catts, a member of the Prohibition Party, appointed the incumbent Florida Attorney General, Thomas F. West, to the Florida Supreme Court. Seeing Swearingen's efforts in cracking down on Jacksonville's red light district, Catts appointed him to finish the remaining 3 years of West's term. Swearingen's tenure as Florida Attorney General remains controversial, Swearingen oversaw the implementation of prohibition in Florida. Despite making use of his spy network from Jacksonville, Swearingen was unable to combat rum runners coming from Cuba and the Bahamas.

Additionally, the Ocoee massacre occurred near the end of Swearingen's tenure. In response to African-Americans attempting to vote in November of 1920 in the town of Ocoee, Florida, the entire black community of North Ocoee was razed to the ground, with as many as 56 blacks lynched or burned in their own homes. Swearingen, a noted racist, did nothing in the aftermath of the massacre to bring the perpetrators to justice.

In 1920, Swearingen did not run for reelection, instead deciding to run for Florida governor. Swearingen faced the Speaker of the Florida House of Representatives Cary A. Hardee and State Senator Lincoln Hulley in the Democratic primary. Swearingen was defeated by Hardee by over 22,000 votes. Hardee would go on to win in the general election.

After this loss, Swearingen retired, moving to Miami, Florida, in 1925.

== Personal life and death ==
Swearingen married Alice Padgett on January 1, 1899. They had 6 children together. Additionally, Swearingen was a member of multiple fraternal orders, including the Freemasons, the Shriners from Jacksonville's Morocco Temple, the Independent Order of Odd Fellows, and the Knights of Pythias.

Swearingen died at his home in Miami on March 3, 1943.

== Electoral history ==
1920 Florida gubernatorial election, Democratic primary
Party	Candidate	Votes	%	±%
Democratic	Cary A. Hardee	52,591	59.48%	N/A
Democratic	Van C. Swearingen	30,240	34.20%	N/A
Democratic	Lincoln Hulley	5,591	6.32%	N/A
Majority		22,351	25.28%	N/A
Turnout		88,422		

1915 Jacksonville mayoral election, Democratic runoff
Party	Candidate	Votes	%	±%
Democratic	J. E. T. Bowden	2,655	58.44%	N/A
Democratic	Van C. Swearingen (inc.)	1,888	41.56%	N/A
Majority		767	16.88%	N/A
Turnout		4,543		

1915 Jacksonville mayoral election, Democratic primary
Party	Candidate	Votes	%	±%
Democratic	Van C. Swearingen (inc.)	1,541	36.01%	N/A
Democratic	J. E. T. Bowden	1,360	31.78%	N/A
Democratic	Charles W. Johnson	1,123	26.24%	N/A
Democratic	Rudolph Grunthal	255	5.96%	N/A
Majority		181	4.23%	N/A
Turnout		4,279		

1913 Jacksonville mayoral election, General election
Party	Candidate	Votes	%	±%
Democratic	Van C. Swearingen	1,364	92.41%	+9.69%
Socialist	Thomas W. Cox	112	7.59%	−9.69%
Majority		1,252	84.82%	+19.38%
Turnout		1,476		

1913 Jacksonville mayoral election, Democratic runoff
Party	Candidate	Votes	%	±%
Democratic	Van C. Swearingen	2,492	53.78%	N/A
Democratic	William S. Jordan (inc.)	2,142	46.22%	N/A
Majority		350	7.56%	N/A
Turnout		4,634		

1913 Jacksonville mayoral election, Democratic primary
Party	Candidate	Votes	%	±%
Democratic	Van C. Swearingen	2,056	46.04%	N/A
Democratic	William S. Jordan (inc.)	1,354	30.32%	N/A
Democratic	John Joseph Ahern	601	13.46%	N/A
Democratic	S. T. Shaylor	267	5.98%	N/A
Democratic	G. T. Christie	187	4.19%	N/A
Majority		702	15.72%	N/A
Turnout		4,465		
