= Fred Henry Davis =

American judge (1894–1937)

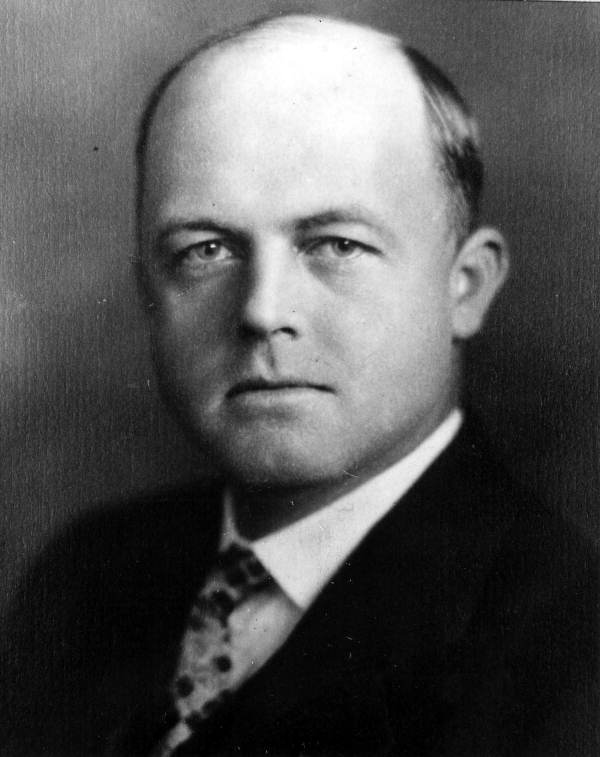

22nd Chief Justice of Florida
- In office January 10, 1933 – January 8, 1935
- Preceded by: Rivers H. Buford
- Succeeded by: James B. Whitfield

Justice of the Supreme Court of Florida
- In office March 9, 1931 – June 20, 1937
- Appointed by: Doyle E. Carlton
- Preceded by: Louie W. Strum
- Succeeded by: Roy H. Chapman

24th Florida Attorney General
- In office June 4, 1927 – March 9, 1931
- Governor: John W. Martin; Doyle E. Carlton
- Preceded by: J. B. Johnson
- Succeeded by: Cary D. Landis

Speaker of the Florida House of Representatives
- In office 1927 – June 4, 1927
- Preceded by: A. Y. Milam
- Succeeded by: Samuel W. Getzen

Member of the Florida House of Representatives from the Leon district
- In office 1920 – June 4, 1927

Prosecuting Attorney for Leon County
- In office 1919–1920
- Appointed by: Sidney Johnston Catts

Special Assistant United States Attorney for the Northern District of Florida
- In office 1917–1917

Personal details
- Born: May 18, 1894 Greenville, South Carolina, US
- Died: June 20, 1937 (aged 43) Jacksonville, Florida, US
- Party: Democratic
- Spouse: Frances M. Chambers (m. 1921)
- Children: 1
- Occupation: Attorney

Military service
- Allegiance: United States
- Branch/service: Florida Army National Guard
- Years of service: 1917–1927
- Rank: Major
- Unit: 124th Infantry Regiment
- Commands: Governor's Guards
- Battles/wars: World War I

Fred Henry Davis (May 18, 1894 – June 20, 1937) was an American attorney and politician from the state of Florida, serving as Chief Justice of the Supreme Court of Florida from 1933 until 1935.

== Early life and military service ==
Davis was born on May 18, 1894, in Greenville, South Carolina, though he settled in Tallahassee, Florida, with his family at an early age. He was admitted to the Florida Bar in 1914 and became a practicing attorney in Wakulla County, Florida.

In 1917, Davis, a Democrat, became the Special Assistant United States Attorney for the Northern District of Florida. He resigned the same year to enlist in the Florida Army National Guard, serving as a private with the 124th Infantry during World War I, though he did not go overseas with the American Expeditionary Force. On December 10, 1918, Davis was discharged from the United States Army and was sent to Camp Hancock, near Augusta, Georgia, to begin his officers' training.

Davis quickly worked his way up the ranks, becoming a lieutenant and later a major in the Army Reserve Corps. Davis commanded Company M of the 124th Infantry, which, in 1924, was designated as the Governor's Guards, a historic infantry unit dating back to the Third Seminole War. Davis retired from the military in 1927.

== Political career ==
After his return to Florida from Camp Hancock in 1919, Davis was appointed as the Prosecuting Attorney for Leon County, Florida, by Governor Sidney Johnson Catts. In 1920, Davis was elected to the Florida House of Representatives, representing Leon County.

He was re-elected in 1922 and 1924. Davis also served as the special counsel for the Florida Railroad Commission in 1925 He was re-elected to the Florida House in 1926 and was selected Speaker of the Florida House of Representatives in 1927. He would only serve for a few months, however, as he was appointed the 24th Florida Attorney General on June 4, 1927, by Governor John W. Martin, finishing the term of J. B. Johnson, who had been appointed to a state circuit court. Davis was elected to a full term in 1928.

On March 9, 1931, Governor Doyle E. Carlton appointed Davis to the Supreme Court of Florida. Davis was selected as Chief Justice on January 10, 1933, serving in that role until January 8, 1935. He continued to serve on the bench until his death in 1937.

== Personal life ==
In 1921, Davis married Frances M. Chambers. They had two daughters.

Davis was a practicing Methodist. He was a member of many veterans' organizations, including the American Legion, the Military Order of the World Wars, the Reserve Officers Association, and the Sons of Confederate Veterans. Additionally, Davis was also a member of several fraternal orders, namely the Freemasons, the Knights Templar, the Shriners, Elks, Lions, Odd Fellows, and Phi Alpha Delta.

== Death ==
On June 20, 1937, Davis died of a sudden heart attack while on a visit to Jacksonville, Florida.

Legal offices
Preceded by J. B. Johnson	Florida Attorney General; 1927–1931	Succeeded by Cary D. Landis
