= 1932 Florida gubernatorial election =

- November 8, 1932
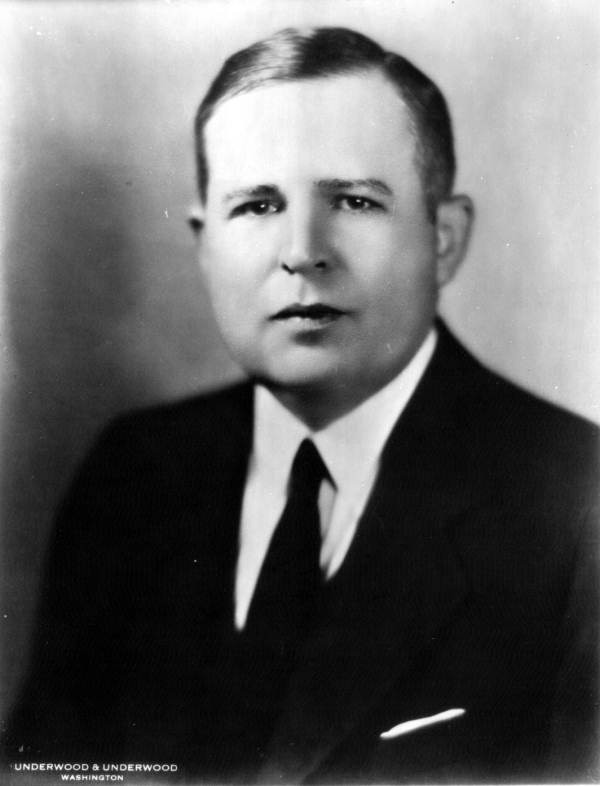

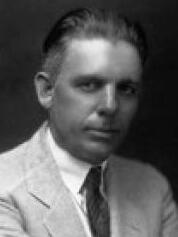
| Nominee | David Sholtz | William J. Howey |
| Party | Democratic | Republican |
| Popular vote | 186,270 | 93,323 |
| Percentage | 66.62% | 33.38% |

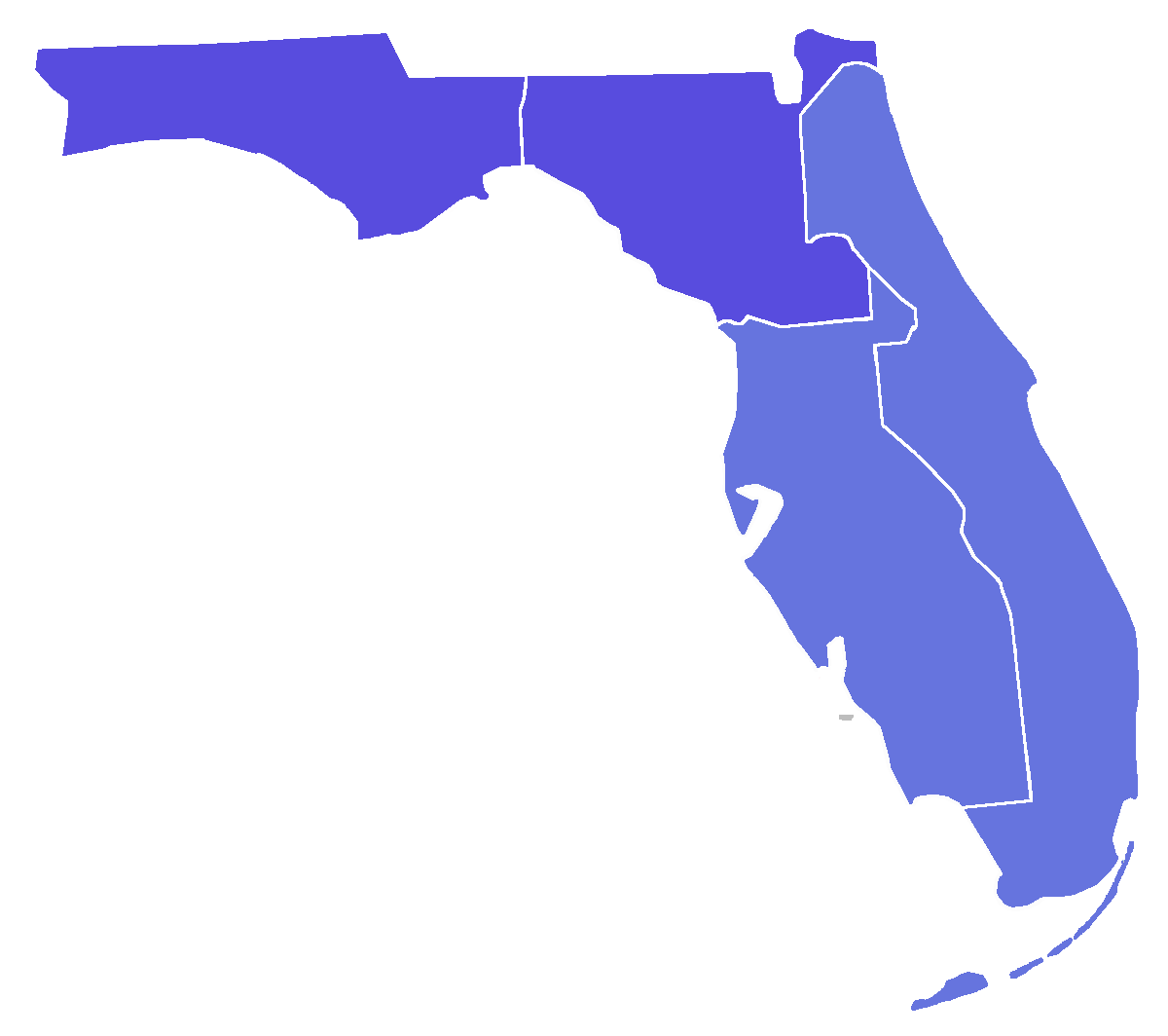
Sholtz
50–60%
60–70%
70–80%
80–90%
Governor before election
Doyle E. Carlton
Democratic
Elected Governor
David Sholtz
Democratic

The 1932 Florida gubernatorial election was held on November 8, 1932. Democratic nominee David Sholtz defeated Republican nominee William J. Howey with 66.62% of the vote.

== Primary elections ==
Primary elections were held on June 7, 1932.

=== Democratic primary ===
During the Democratic primary, the campaign platforms for several candidates are known. David Sholtz would run on a campaign involving: increasing government services, giving back pay for teachers, making school terms 9 months long, free textbook for school students, creating a workers' compensation law, increasing bank regulation and providing more funding for public welfare. Carl Maples would pitch himself as being someone who supported a localized self-government. Former governor Cary A. Hardee would emphasize his record when he was governor while running in the primaries. Another former governor, John W. Martin would emphasize that he led to many roads being paved in Florida and would promise that if elected for a second nonconsecutive term as governor he would give: "a dollar in his pocket and a smile on his face."

Many political observers believed that former governors John W. Martin and Cary A. Hardee would face off against each other in a runoff race.

==== Candidates ====
- David Sholtz, former State Representative
- John W. Martin, former Governor
- Cary A. Hardee, former Governor
- Stafford Caldwell, attorney for Florida East Coast Railway
- Charles W. Durrance
- T. S. Hart
- Arthur Gomez, State Senator for the 24th District
- J. Thomas Watson, State Representative

=== Endorsements ===
David Sholtz

U.S. Senators

- Duncan Fletcher, U.S. Senator from Florida (1909–1936)

==== Results ====
Democratic Primary Runoff by county Sholtz: 50–60%; 60–70%; 70–80%; 80–90%; Martin: 50–60%; 60–70%; 70–80%

Democratic primary results
| Party | Candidate | Votes | % |
|---|---|---|---|
| Democratic | John W. Martin | 66,940 | 24.19 |
| Democratic | David Sholtz | 55,406 | 20.02 |
| Democratic | Cary A. Hardee | 50,427 | 18.22 |
| Democratic | Stafford Caldwell | 44,938 | 16.24 |
| Democratic | Charles W. Durrance | 36,291 | 13.12 |
| Democratic | T. S. Hart | 9,525 | 3.44 |
| Democratic | Arthur Gomez | 9,244 | 3.34 |
| Democratic | J. Thomas Watson | 3,949 | 1.43 |
| Total votes | | 276,720 | 100.00 |

Democratic primary runoff results
| Party | Candidate | Votes | % |
|---|---|---|---|
| Democratic | David Sholtz | 173,540 | 62.80 |
| Democratic | John W. Martin | 102,805 | 37.20 |
| Total votes | | 276,345 | 100.00 |

==== Runoff Results by county ====
| County | David Sholtz | | John W. Martin | | Total votes |
| County | # | % | # | % | Total votes |
|---|---|---|---|---|---|
| Alachua | 2,836 | 60.55% | 1,848 | 39.45% | 4,684 |
| Baker | 647 | 41.66% | 906 | 58.34% | 1,553 |
| Bay | 1,903 | 50.22% | 1,886 | 49.78% | 3,789 |
| Bradford | 1,029 | 60.57% | 670 | 39.43% | 1,699 |
| Brevard | 1,482 | 57.33% | 1,103 | 42.67% | 2,585 |
| Broward | 3,231 | 79.90% | 813 | 20.10% | 4,044 |
| Calhoun | 890 | 43.65% | 1,149 | 56.35% | 2,039 |
| Charlotte | 716 | 65.93% | 370 | 34.07% | 1,086 |
| Citrus | 1,029 | 59.51% | 700 | 40.49% | 1,729 |
| Clay | 1,137 | 57.08% | 855 | 42.92% | 1,992 |
| Collier | 158 | 33.83% | 309 | 66.17% | 467 |
| Columbia | 1,676 | 52.00% | 1,547 | 48.00% | 3,223 |
| Dade | 15,630 | 71.90% | 6,109 | 28.10% | 21,739 |
| DeSoto | 1,936 | 72.78% | 724 | 27.22% | 2,660 |
| Dixie | 563 | 42.91% | 749 | 57.09% | 1,312 |
| Duval | 16,877 | 62.53% | 10,115 | 37.47% | 26,992 |
| Escambia | 5,545 | 64.19% | 3,093 | 35.81% | 8,638 |
| Flagler | 323 | 52.35% | 294 | 47.65% | 617 |
| Franklin | 303 | 24.32% | 943 | 75.68% | 1,246 |
| Gadsden | 1,052 | 46.22% | 1,224 | 53.78% | 2,276 |
| Gilchrist | 319 | 29.24% | 772 | 70.76% | 1,091 |
| Glades | 363 | 45.43% | 436 | 54.57% | 799 |
| Gulf | 272 | 30.73% | 613 | 69.27% | 885 |
| Hamilton | 602 | 36.31% | 1,056 | 63.69% | 1,658 |
| Hardee | 2,430 | 71.85% | 952 | 28.15% | 3,382 |
| Hendry | 482 | 52.85% | 430 | 47.15% | 912 |
| Hernando | 1,105 | 68.17% | 516 | 31.83% | 1,621 |
| Hillsborough | 21,510 | 80.18% | 5,316 | 19.82% | 26,826 |
| Holmes | 1,564 | 36.46% | 2,726 | 63.54% | 4,290 |
| Indian River | 1,048 | 52.96% | 931 | 47.04% | 1,979 |
| Jackson | 2,590 | 32.55% | 5,368 | 67.45% | 7,958 |
| Jefferson | 763 | 42.63% | 1,027 | 57.37% | 1,790 |
| Lafayette | 280 | 23.61% | 906 | 76.39% | 1,186 |
| Lake | 2,415 | 64.73% | 1,316 | 35.27% | 3,731 |
| Lee | 2,409 | 61.52% | 1,507 | 38.48% | 3,916 |
| Leon | 857 | 22.12% | 3,018 | 77.88% | 3,875 |
| Levy | 1,257 | 56.78% | 957 | 43.22% | 2,214 |
| Liberty | 259 | 22.62% | 886 | 77.38% | 1,145 |
| Madison | 1,294 | 58.39% | 922 | 41.61% | 2,216 |
| Manatee | 3,546 | 84.41% | 922 | 15.59% | 4,201 |
| Marion | 2,365 | 56.04% | 1,855 | 43.96% | 4,220 |
| Martin | 460 | 46.05% | 539 | 53.95% | 999 |
| Monroe | 2,245 | 66.44% | 1,134 | 33.56% | 3,379 |
| Nassau | 995 | 55.65% | 793 | 44.35% | 1,788 |
| Okaloosa | 1,561 | 54.68% | 1,294 | 45.32% | 2,855 |
| Okeechobee | 694 | 66.79% | 345 | 33.21% | 1,039 |
| Orange | 5,151 | 77.92% | 1,460 | 22.08% | 6,611 |
| Osceola | 1,583 | 70.32% | 668 | 29.68% | 2,251 |
| Palm Beach | 8,600 | 77.52% | 2,494 | 22.48% | 11,094 |
| Pasco | 2,582 | 75.23% | 850 | 24.77% | 3,432 |
| Pinellas | 7,124 | 75.71% | 2,285 | 24.29% | 9,409 |
| Polk | 8,873 | 78.89% | 2,375 | 21.11% | 11,248 |
| Putnam | 1,889 | 58.16% | 1,359 | 41.84% | 3,248 |
| Santa Rosa | 1,740 | 46.30% | 2,018 | 53.70% | 3,758 |
| Sarasota | 1,904 | 73.20% | 697 | 26.80% | 2,601 |
| Seminole | 2,155 | 70.04% | 922 | 29.96% | 3,077 |
| St. Johns | 2,792 | 63.34% | 1,616 | 36.66% | 4,408 |
| St. Lucie | 1,287 | 63.15% | 1,616 | 36.85% | 2,038 |
| Sumter | 1,389 | 58.51% | 985 | 41.49% | 2,374 |
| Suwannee | 1,142 | 40.73% | 1,662 | 59.27% | 2,804 |
| Taylor | 753 | 41.28% | 1,071 | 58.72% | 1,824 |
| Union | 628 | 53.09% | 555 | 46.91% | 1,183 |
| Volusia | 6,830 | 71.96% | 2,661 | 28.04% | 9,491 |
| Wakulla | 358 | 22.28% | 1,249 | 77.72% | 1,607 |
| Walton | 1,700 | 46.81% | 1,932 | 53.19% | 3,632 |
| Washington | 1,189 | 31.17% | 2,625 | 68.83% | 3,814 |
| Totals | 173,540 | 62.80% | 102,805 | 37.20% | 276,345 |

== General election ==
William J. Howey ran on a similar campaign platform to 1928. During his 1932 platform he promised to reduce the amount of circuit courts, replace county school boards with appointed superintendents and give parole to prisoners after serving 1/3 of their sentence. He supported refinancing the state's bonds at lower interest rates. As a way to pay off the state's debts, he proposed stopping all road construction and diverting the funds instead to paying off the state's debts. Howey was in favor of giving more legal rights to women and was fond of the benefits of having a two party system in the state. The Republicans favored abolishing the poll tax in the state while the Democrats were against this as they saw this as a major blow to white supremacy in the state.

=== Candidates ===
- David Sholtz, Democratic
- William J. Howey, Republican, businessman, real estate developer and mayor of Howey-in-the-Hills.

=== Results ===
1932 Florida gubernatorial election
| Party | Candidate | Votes | % | ±% |
|---|---|---|---|---|
| Democratic | David Sholtz | 186,270 | 66.62% | |
| Republican | William J. Howey | 93,323 | 33.38% | |
| Majority | | 92,947 | | |
| Turnout | | | | |
| Democratic hold | | Swing | | |

==== Results by county ====
| County | David Sholtz Democratic | | William J. Howey Republican | | Total votes |
| County | # | % | # | % | Total votes |
|---|---|---|---|---|---|
| Alachua | 3,099 | 67.92% | 1,464 | 32.08% | 4,563 |
| Baker | 1,019 | 75.76% | 326 | 24.24% | 1,345 |
| Bay | 2,493 | 79.50% | 643 | 20.50% | 3,136 |
| Bradford | 1,217 | 79.65% | 311 | 20.35% | 1,528 |
| Brevard | 1,606 | 54.76% | 1,327 | 45.24% | 2,933 |
| Broward | 3,173 | 61.34% | 2,000 | 38.66% | 5,173 |
| Calhoun | 1,049 | 72.44% | 399 | 27.56% | 1,448 |
| Charlotte | 835 | 60.20% | 552 | 39.80% | 1,387 |
| Citrus | 1,081 | 77.60% | 312 | 22.40% | 1,393 |
| Clay | 1,082 | 58.52% | 767 | 41.48% | 1,849 |
| Collier | 373 | 80.91% | 88 | 19.09% | 461 |
| Columbia | 2,213 | 82.39% | 473 | 17.61% | 2,686 |
| Dade | 16,530 | 59.88% | 11,077 | 40.12% | 27,607 |
| DeSoto | 1,504 | 67.69% | 718 | 32.31% | 2,222 |
| Dixie | 1,002 | 84.56% | 183 | 15.44% | 1,185 |
| Duval | 15,949 | 62.77% | 9,460 | 37.23% | 25,409 |
| Escambia | 5,441 | 68.70% | 2,479 | 31.30% | 7,920 |
| Flagler | 415 | 71.43% | 166 | 28.57% | 581 |
| Franklin | 893 | 83.61% | 175 | 16.39% | 1,068 |
| Gadsden | 1,660 | 82.71% | 347 | 17.29% | 2,007 |
| Gilchrist | 629 | 72.80% | 235 | 27.20% | 864 |
| Glades | 448 | 62.14% | 273 | 37.86% | 721 |
| Gulf | 567 | 83.14% | 115 | 16.86% | 682 |
| Hamilton | 867 | 69.36% | 383 | 30.64% | 1,250 |
| Hardee | 2,200 | 69.38% | 971 | 30.62% | 3,171 |
| Hendry | 624 | 72.64% | 235 | 27.36% | 859 |
| Hernando | 975 | 70.14% | 415 | 29.86% | 1,390 |
| Highlands | 1,539 | 66.22% | 785 | 33.78% | 2,324 |
| Hillsborough | 17,962 | 73.55% | 6,460 | 26.45% | 24,422 |
| Holmes | 2,384 | 75.44% | 776 | 24.56% | 3,160 |
| Indian River | 1,033 | 59.27% | 710 | 40.73% | 1,743 |
| Jackson | 4,127 | 77.30% | 1,212 | 22.70% | 5,339 |
| Jefferson | 1,287 | 87.25% | 188 | 12.75% | 1,475 |
| Lafayette | 826 | 86.40% | 130 | 13.60% | 956 |
| Lake | 2,601 | 51.35% | 2,464 | 48.65% | 5,065 |
| Lee | 2,381 | 66.34% | 1,208 | 33.66% | 3,589 |
| Leon | 2,656 | 81.70% | 595 | 18.30% | 3,251 |
| Levy | 1,418 | 79.40% | 368 | 20.60% | 1,786 |
| Liberty | 584 | 82.14% | 127 | 17.86% | 711 |
| Madison | 1,484 | 80.17% | 367 | 19.83% | 1,851 |
| Manatee | 2,834 | 65.25% | 1,509 | 34.75% | 4,343 |
| Marion | 2,385 | 57.32% | 1,776 | 42.68% | 4,161 |
| Martin | 700 | 58.53% | 496 | 41.47% | 1,196 |
| Monroe | 2,648 | 87.11% | 392 | 12.89% | 3,040 |
| Nassau | 907 | 59.91% | 607 | 40.09% | 1,514 |
| Okaloosa | 1,841 | 79.15% | 485 | 20.85% | 2,326 |
| Okeechobee | 717 | 78.79% | 193 | 21.21% | 910 |
| Orange | 4,859 | 56.61% | 3,725 | 43.39% | 8,584 |
| Osceola | 1,467 | 55.40% | 1,181 | 44.60% | 2,648 |
| Palm Beach | 7,732 | 65.04% | 4,156 | 34.96% | 11,888 |
| Pasco | 2,217 | 64.43% | 1,224 | 35.57% | 3,441 |
| Pinellas | 9,787 | 57.83% | 7,138 | 42.17% | 16,925 |
| Polk | 8,785 | 66.66% | 4,393 | 33.34% | 13,178 |
| Putnam | 1,894 | 57.73% | 1,387 | 42.27% | 3,281 |
| Santa Rosa | 2,318 | 73.08% | 854 | 26.92% | 3,172 |
| Sarasota | 1,839 | 67.61% | 881 | 32.39% | 2,720 |
| Seminole | 2,008 | 63.10% | 1,174 | 36.90% | 3,182 |
| St. Johns | 3,043 | 66.07% | 1,563 | 33.93% | 4,606 |
| St. Lucie | 1,479 | 73.55% | 532 | 26.45% | 2,011 |
| Sumter | 1,523 | 65.25% | 811 | 34.75% | 2,334 |
| Suwannee | 1,758 | 77.31% | 516 | 22.69% | 2,274 |
| Taylor | 1,134 | 73.21% | 415 | 26.79% | 1,549 |
| Union | 846 | 83.60% | 166 | 16.40% | 1,012 |
| Volusia | 7,197 | 59.44% | 4,910 | 40.56% | 12,107 |
| Wakulla | 913 | 84.85% | 163 | 15.15% | 1,076 |
| Walton | 2,238 | 80.13% | 555 | 19.87% | 2,793 |
| Washington | 1,975 | 70.23% | 837 | 29.77% | 2,812 |
| Total | 186,270 | 66.62% | 93,323 | 33.38% | 279,593 |

Counties that flipped from Republican to Democratic

- Dade
- DeSoto
- Hardee
- Lake
- Manatee
- Marion
- Orange
- Pasco
- Pinellas
- Sarasota
