= T. Frank Hobson =

American judge (1900–1966)

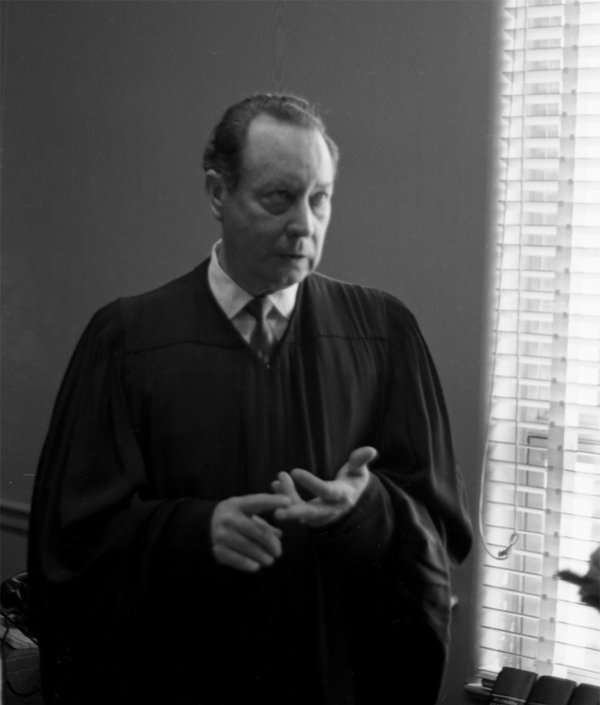
Hobson in 1961.

Tolbert Frank Hobson (August 1, 1900 – August 3, 1966) was a justice of the Florida Supreme Court from 1948 to 1962.

Hobson was born in Hagler, Alabama in 1900 but grew up in Jacksonville, Florida. His father, W.A. Hobson, founded the Hobson Memorial Baptist Church. Hobson attended Duval County schools and Marion Military Institute in Alabama. He graduated from Wake Forest University in 1922 and married Mabel Miller the following year. Hobson then attended Stetson University College of Law, graduating in 1924 and passing the bar the same year. He began his legal practice in St. Petersburg, Florida in 1925, and joined the board of law examiners in 1926. In 1928, Hobson was appointed to the Sixth Judicial Circuit Court, in Pinellas County and served for 20 years.

Governor Millard F. Caldwell appointed Hobson to fill Rivers H. Buford's vacancy on the Florida Supreme Court in 1948, and he assumed the role on April 6. Later in the year, he ran as a Democrat for the seat and was elected. On the bench, Hobson became known for unusual work habits, often working late into the night and sleeping during the day. Justice Richard Ervin wrote that Justice Hobson "did not like pretense or hypocrisy. . . [and] would smile broadly when someone was obviously being petty or pontifical or political or catering to special interests . . . for personal glory." He was named chief justice in January 1953, though he relinquished this role due to health problems on March 14. Hobson earned a Distinguished Service Award from Stetson University in 1954. His health problems persisted, and on February 13, 1962, Hobson resigned as Justice, with Caldwell being appointed in his place.

After retiring from the Supreme Court, Hobson joined his son T. Frank Hobson Jr. on the 2nd District Court of Appeal. Hobson died of a heart attack at Johns Hopkins Hospital in Baltimore, Maryland on August 3, 1966. He had been in the hospital for a checkup with a heart specialist. His wife Mabel died on March 8, 1994.

Political offices
Preceded by Rivers H. Buford	Justice of the Florida Supreme Court; 1948–1962	Succeeded by Millard F. Caldwell
