= J. E. T. Bowden =

American politician (1857–1930)

J.E.T. Bowden

24th & 31st Mayor of Jacksonville
- In office 1899–1901
- Preceded by: Raymond D. Knight
- Succeeded by: Duncan U. Fletcher
- In office 1915–1917
- Preceded by: Van C. Swearingen
- Succeeded by: John W. Martin

Personal details
- Born: September 14, 1857 Spartanburg, South Carolina, U.S.
- Died: November 19, 1930 (aged 73) Jacksonville, Florida, U.S.

James Edwin Theodore Bowden (September 14, 1857 – November 19, 1930) was an American politician. He served as the 24th and 31st preconsolidation mayor of Jacksonville, Florida from 1899 to 1901 and again from 1915 to 1917.

Bowden moved to Waycross, Georgia and served in the Georgia House of Representatives and Georgia Senate. He married Cora Elizabeth King of Arcadia, Florida, daughter of Ziba King.

== See also ==
- List of former members of the Georgia State Senate
