= Ocoee massacre =

1920 mass violence in Florida, U.S.

Coordinates: 28.5933°N 81.5276°W

- Part of the Nadir of American race relations
- Location: Ocoee, Florida
- Date: November 2–3, 1920
- Attack type: Massacre
- Deaths: 30–80 black people 2 white rioters
- Perpetrator: White mobs
- No. of participants: 200+

The Ocoee massacre was an act of mass racial violence in November 1920. During the massacre, a white mob attacked African American residents in the northern parts of Ocoee, Florida, a town located in Orange County near Orlando. Ocoee was the home to 255 African-Americans and 560 white residents according to the 1920 Census. The massacre took place on November 2, the day of the US presidential election, leaving a lasting impact; the 1930 census showed 1,180 whites, 11 Native Americans, and 2 African Americans (0.2%).

By most estimates, a total of 30–80 black people were killed during what has been considered the "single bloodiest day in modern American political history". Most African American-owned buildings and residences in northern Ocoee were burned to the ground. Other African Americans living in southern Ocoee were later killed or driven out of town by the threat of further violence being used against them. Thus, Ocoee essentially became an all-white or "sundown" town.

It is believed that the attack was intended to prevent black citizens from voting. Poll taxes had been imposed as de facto disenfranchisement in Florida since the beginning of the 20th century. In Ocoee and across the state, various black organizations had been conducting voter registration drives for a year. Those who registered to vote registered almost exclusively as Republicans because blacks were not permitted to join the all-white Democratic Party.

Following a confrontation with a Black man named Mose Norman as he attempted to vote, reinforcements from Orlando and Orange County were called upon, contributing to a mob that laid waste to the African-American community in northern Ocoee and eventually lynching Perry, who was in custody at the Orange County Sheriff's Office, shooting and taking his body to Orlando, where he was hanged from a lightpost to intimidate other black people. Norman escaped, never to be found. Hundreds of other African Americans fled the town, leaving behind their homes and possessions. The white mobs burned at least twenty-five black-owned homes, two churches, and a black fraternal lodge.

"Most of the people living in Ocoee don't even know that this happened there", said Pamela Schwartz, chief curator of the Orange County Regional History Center, which sponsored an exhibit on it. For almost a century, many descendants of survivors were not aware of the massacre that occurred in their hometown.

== Background ==
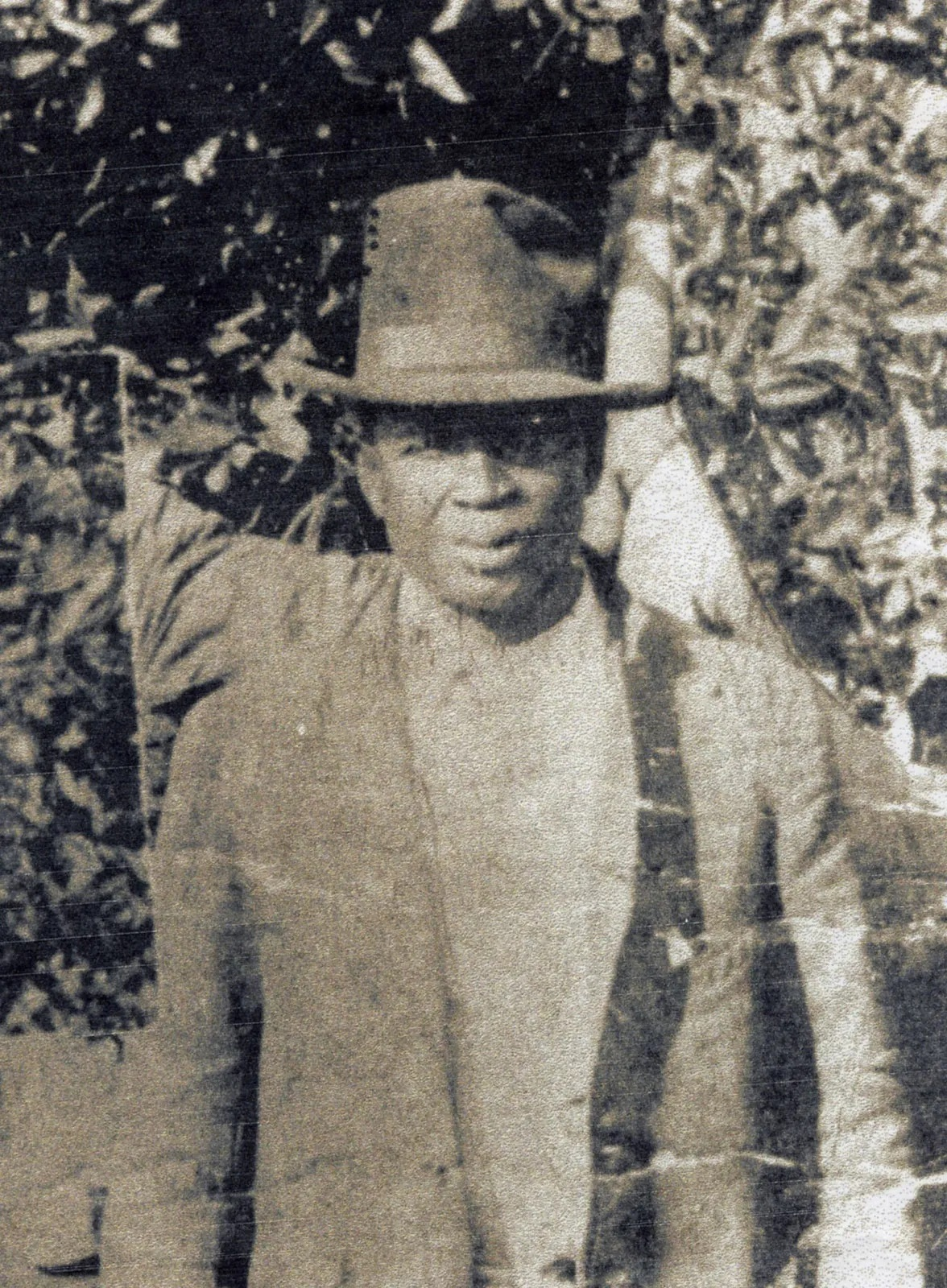
Julius "July" Perry, a black resident of Ocoee, Florida, who was lynched on Nov. 3, 1920, during the Ocoee massacre.

Twenty-eight enslaved persons and Ocoee's first white settler, the slave owner, James D. Starke, are included in the 1860 Orange County Census. Beginning in 1888, many African American residents of Ocoee were able to purchase farmland, "bringing them wealth and security often denied to Black folks in the Jim Crow South".

Orange County, as well as the rest of Florida, had been "politically dominated by Southern white Democrats" (also known as Dixiecrats) since the end of Reconstruction. In the weeks leading up to the presidential election of 1920, African Americans throughout the South were registering to vote in record numbers. At the same time the Ku Klux Klan (KKK) had established many new chapters since 1915. Three weeks before election day, the KKK threatened the African American community that "not a single Negro would be permitted to vote."

Judge John Moses Cheney, a Republican running for the United States Senate from Florida, participated actively in the campaign to register African Americans to vote in Florida. As a lawyer, he had represented African American clients during the segregation era. Mose Norman and July Perry, both "prosperous African American landowners in Ocoee," led the local voter registration efforts in Orange County, paying the poll tax for those who could not afford it. In an effort to preserve white one-party rule, the KKK "marched in full regalia through the streets of Jacksonville, Daytona and Orlando" to intimidate opponents. Because African Americans had supported the Republican Party since Reconstruction, the KKK threatened Judge Cheney prior to the election.

Sam Salisbury was a police chief in Orlando, Florida. A native of New York, Salisbury served in the US military and was known as Colonel Sam Salisbury. A white supremacist and a member of the KKK, Salisbury bragged about his involvement in the violent oppression and intimidation of African Americans attempting to vote in the previous 1920 election. He was one of the leaders of the events leading up to the Ocoee massacre. He was injured in an attack he led on July Perry's home in Ocoee.

== Massacre ==
=== Election day ===
African Americans were met with resistance from the white community when they attempted to vote on election day. Poll workers challenged whether African American voters were really registered. The voters had to prove they were registered by appearing before the notary public, R. C. Biegelow, who was regularly sent on fishing trips so that he was impossible to find. However, African Americans, including Mose Norman, persisted but were "pushed and shoved away" from the polls.

Norman contacted Judge John Cheney, who told him that interference with voting was illegal and told him to write the names of the African Americans who were denied their constitutional rights, as well as the names of the whites who were violating them. Norman later returned to the polling place in Ocoee. It is not clear whether Norman's shotgun was stolen from his car while he attempted to vote, but whites at the polls drove off Norman using his own shotgun.

The white community began to form a mob and paraded up and down the streets, growing "more disorderly and unmanageable". The rest of the African Americans gave up on trying to vote and left the polling place. Later during the evening, Sam Salisbury, the former chief of police of Orlando, was called to lead a lynch mob to "find and punish Mose Norman." He later proudly bragged about his part in the events.

Regarding the KKK, historian David Chalmers asserts: "the evidence does not point to Klan responsibility or participation in the election day race riot in Ocoee in 1920."

=== Invasion of Perry's home ===
The armed white mob was on its way to Norman's home when someone informed them that their target had been seen at the home of July Perry. The mob, by then numbering about 100 men, arrived at Perry's house demanding that Perry and Norman surrender. When they received no answer, they attempted to break down the front door. Perry, who had been warned about the mob, fired gunshots from inside the home in self-defense. Exactly how many people were defending the house is uncertain; the whites estimated that there were several armed African Americans. Zora Neale Hurston wrote that Perry had defended his home alone. Sam Salisbury knocked the back door open and was shot in the arm, becoming the first white casualty. Two other whites, veterans Elmer McDaniels and Leo Borgard, were killed when they also tried to enter through the back door. Their bodies were found hours later in the backyard.

The white mob withdrew and put out a call for reinforcements to whites in Orlando, Apopka, and Orange County, either calling them by phone or sending for them by car. During the two- to three-hour lull while the whites were recruiting other men, July Perry, injured in the conflict, attempted to flee with the help of his wife into a cane patch. He was found by the white mob at dawn and arrested. After Perry was treated at a hospital for his wounds, he was taken by a white mob from a vehicle while being transferred to a jail. They lynched him, "and left his body hanging from a telephone post beside the highway." The lynchers hung Perry's body from a tree near the home of Judge Cheney. Norman was never found. Much of the trouble was attributed to "outsiders" from Winter Garden and Orlando. At least twenty-five black-owned homes, two churches, and a black fraternal lodge were burned.

=== Destruction of Ocoee ===
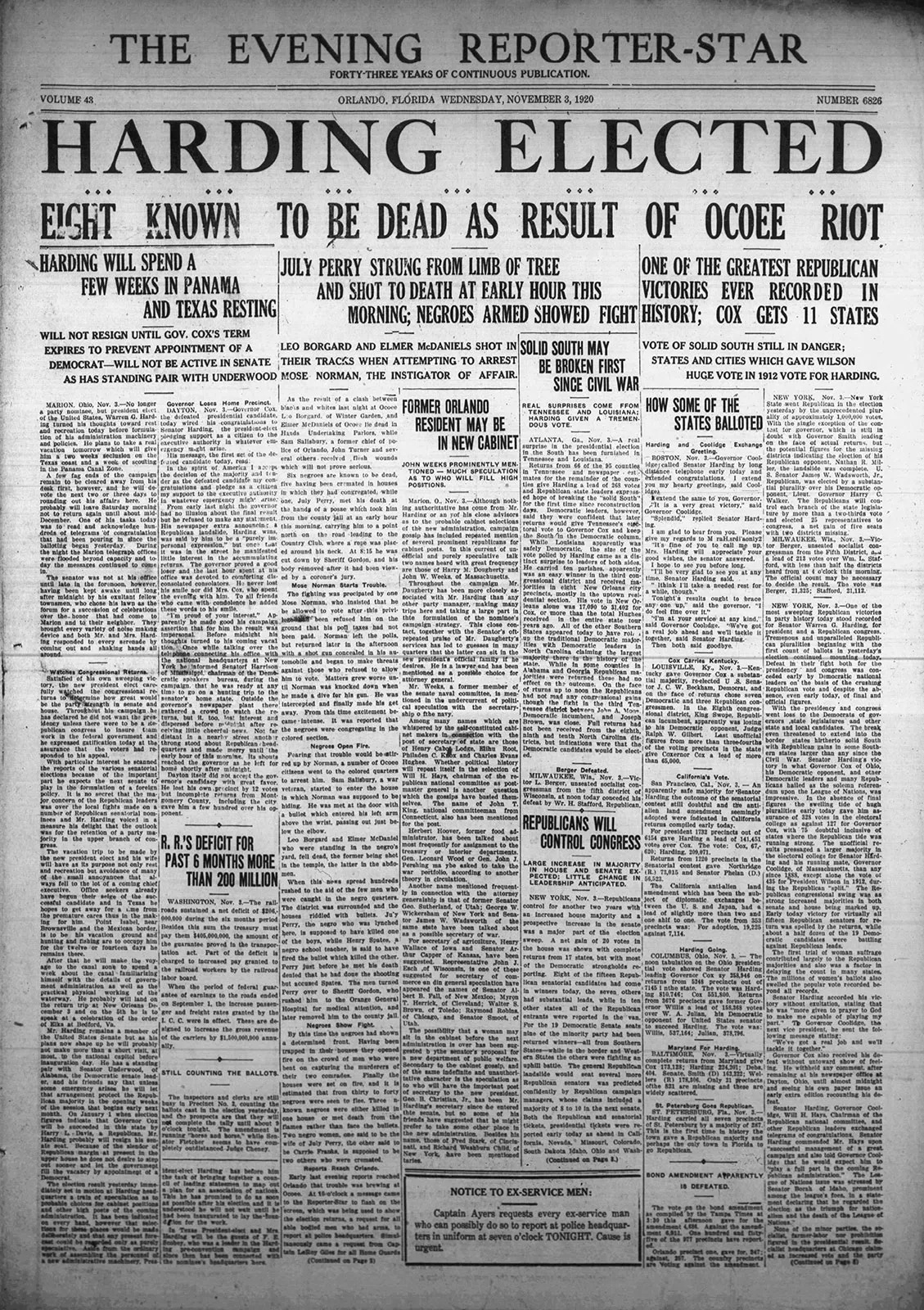
Front page of the Orlando Evening Reporter-Star, on Nov. 3, 1920, documents the Ocoee massacre.

With the reinforcement of some 200 men, the white mob took the massacre to the rest of the African-American community in northern Ocoee. The "white paramilitary forces surrounded the northern Ocoee black community and laid siege to it." They set fire to rows of African American houses; those inside were forced to flee and many were shot by whites. At least 20 buildings were burned in total, including every African American church, schoolhouse, and lodge room in the vicinity. African American residents fought back in an evening-long gunfight lasting until as late as 4:45 a.m., their firearms later found in the ruins after the massacre ended. Eventually, black residents were driven into the nearby orange groves and swamps, forced to retreat until they were driven out of town. The fleeing sought refuge in the surrounding woods or in the neighboring towns of Winter Garden and Apopka, which had substantial populations of black people.

The siege of Ocoee claimed numerous African American victims. Langmaid, an African American carpenter, was beaten and castrated. Maggie Genlack and her pregnant daughter died while hiding in her home; their bodies were found partially burned underneath it. Roosevelt Barton, an African American hiding in July Perry's barn, was shot after the mob set fire to the barn and forced him to flee. Hattie Smith was visiting her pregnant sister-in-law in Ocoee when her sister-in-law's home was set on fire. Smith fled, but her sister-in-law's family was killed while they hid and waited for help that never came.

== Aftermath ==
=== Expulsion of African Americans ===
The African American residents of southern Ocoee, while not direct victims of the massacre, were later threatened into leaving. Annie Hamiter, an African American woman residing in southern Ocoee (sometimes referred to as Mrs. J. H. Hamiter), suspected that the massacre was planned so that whites could seize the property of prosperous African Americans for nothing. According to Hamiter, people in southern Ocoee were coerced by the threat of being shot and burned out if they did not "sell out and leave." About 500 African Americans in total were rapidly driven out of Ocoee, resulting in its population being nearly all white. That fall, white residents had to work to harvest the citrus crop because black laborers had fled the region. No African American residents settled there again "until sixty-one years later in 1981".

=== Subsequent events ===
July Perry's body was found "riddled with bullets" and swinging on a telephone post by the highway. According to The Chicago Defender, his body was left near a sign reading, "This is what we do to niggers that vote". Another source has said he was hanged near the home of a judge who supported the black voter franchise. A local photographer was selling photos of Perry's body for 25 cents each; several stores placed the photo on exhibition by their windows. No one was prosecuted for his murder. Perry's wife, Estelle Perry, and their daughter were wounded during the shooting at their home, but survived. The authorities sent them to Tampa for treatment in order "to avoid further disturbance."

Walter White of the NAACP arrived in Orange County a few days after the riot to investigate events. He was traveling undercover as a white northerner interested in buying orange grove property in the county. He found that the whites there were "still giddy with victory." A local real estate agent and a taxi cab driver told him that about 56 African Americans were killed in the massacre. White's NAACP report recorded around thirty dead. A Methodist pastor, Reverend J. A. Long, and a Baptist minister, Reverend H. K. Hill, both from Orlando, reported that they had heard of 35 African-American deaths in Ocoee as a result of the fires and shootings. Charles Cowe in 1970 described 12 dead. A University of Florida student who interviewed local residents for a history term paper claimed in 1949 that "About thirty to thirty-five [murdered] is the most common estimate of the old timers." The exact number could never be determined. White also learned that many black residents thought the massacre was due to the white community's jealousy of prosperous African Americans, such as Norman and Perry.

The Bureau of Investigation came to Ocoee to investigate the massacre, but the agents were only interested in the possibility of election fraud.

Supporters urged the House Election Committee of Congress to investigate the riot and voter suppression in Florida, with a view to suing under the Fourteenth Amendment, but it failed to act.

== Remembrance and study ==
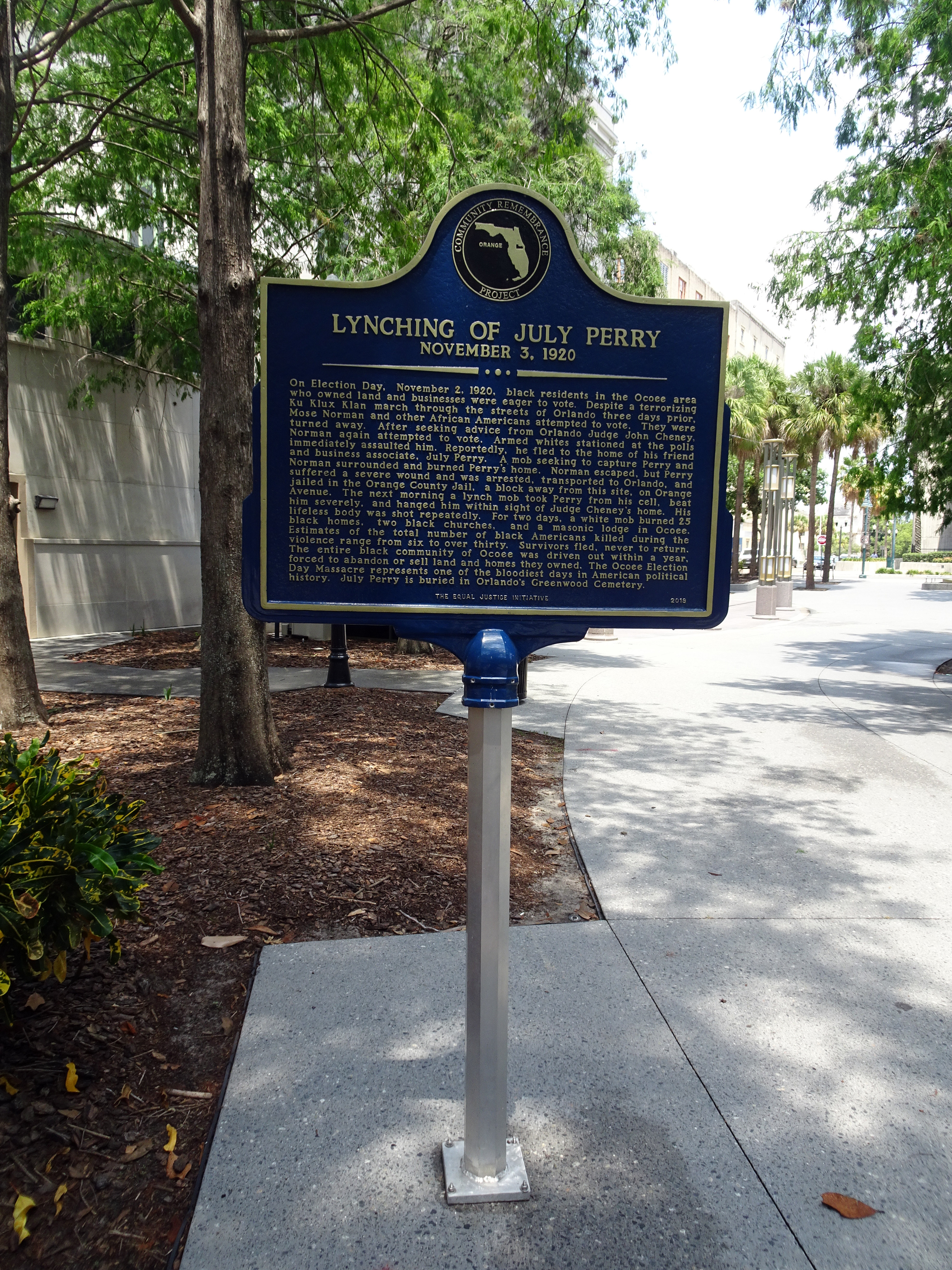
A historical marker in remembrance of July Perry was erected by the Equal Justice Initiative at the Orange County Regional History Center in Orlando.

- In 1969, Lester Dabbs, a future mayor of Ocoee, wrote his master's thesis on the massacre.
- In the 1990s, the Democracy Forum and West Orange Reconciliation Task Force, made up of residents of Ocoee and Orange County, organized discussions to explore the events and honor the victims.
- On Martin Luther King Day in 2010, the town of Ocoee sponsored a commemoration that included keynote speaker Professor Paul Ortiz from the University of Florida, author of a history of the events that occurred in the 1920 Election Day massacre.
- At 10:30 a.m. on June 21, 2019, a historical marker honoring July Perry was placed during a ceremony in Heritage Square outside of the Orange County Regional History Center.
- Melissa Fussell, a central Florida native and then William & Mary law student, wrote a law review piece exploring the details of the tragedy, including widespread concealment and property loss, and advocating redress for its victims and their descendants.
- The Peace and Justice Institute at Valencia College hosted a series of workshops in Central Florida titled "1920 Ocoee and Beyond: Paths to Truth and Reconciliation" in 2018 with digital archives, panel discussions, and group serial testimony to bring light to the massacre and the racial injustices still occurring today.
- In 2018, the city of Ocoee released a proclamation acknowledging the massacre. A formal apology to descendants is "in the works".
- The Florida legislature has passed a law requiring that the Ocoee Election Day massacre be taught in Florida schools. On June 23, 2020, Florida Governor Ron DeSantis signed into law House Bill 1213 (2020), which directs the Commissioner of Education's African-American History Task Force to determine ways in which the 1920 Ocoee Election Day Riots will be included in required instruction on African-American history.
- On October 3, 2020, the Orange County Regional History Center opened the landmark exhibition, "Yesterday, This Was Home: The Ocoee Massacre of 1920", recognizing the centenary of the massacre. It includes original research, an interactive land deed map of black landowners, testimony of family descendants, and a full series of educational programming.
- On November 2, 2020, 100 years after the massacre, Florida Governor Ron DeSantis proclaimed "Ocoee Massacre Remembrance Day".

== Representation in other media ==
- Bianca White and Sandra Krasa produced a documentary film about the riot and related events, Go Ahead On, Ocoee (2002), produced by the University of Florida.
- In the spring of 2020, a short docuseries entitled "The Ocoee Massacre" was posted on YouTube on May 25, 2020, relating the events of the Ocoee Massacre.
- On November 1, 2020, WFTV 9 (ABC) in Orlando broadcast a documentary on the Ocoee Massacre, which was subsequently released to many streaming services on the 100th anniversary the next day.

== See also ==
- 1906 Atlanta race massacre
- List of incidents of civil unrest in the United States
- Mass racial violence in the United States
- Newberry Six lynchings
- Perry massacre
- Red Summer
- Rosewood massacre
- Van C. Swearingen
- Tulsa race massacre

== Bibliography ==
- Hurston, Zora N. "The Ocoee Riot", 3 pages, Box 2, folder, "Atrocities Perpetrated Upon June 1938" (WPA Papers), Florida Negro Papers. http://digital.lib.usf.edu/SFS0021874/00001 (accessed February 22, 2018)
- Ortiz, Paul (2006). Emancipation Betrayed: The Hidden History of Black Organizing and White Violence in Florida From Reconstruction to the Bloody Election of 1920. University of California Press. ISBN 978-0-520-25003-1.
