= David Sholtz =

American politician (1891–1953)

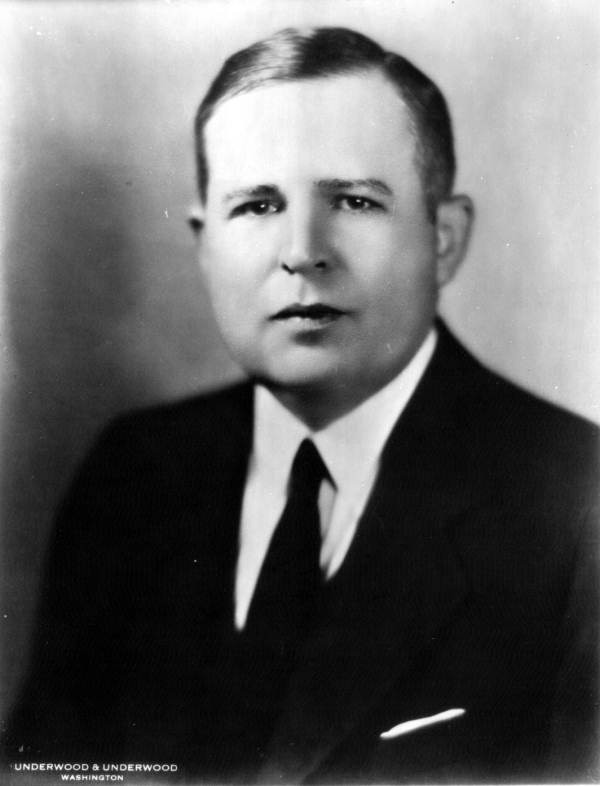
- Sholtz in 1936

26th Governor of Florida
- In office January 3, 1933 – January 5, 1937
- Preceded by: Doyle E. Carlton
- Succeeded by: Fred P. Cone

President of the Florida Chamber of Commerce
- In office 1928–1929

State Attorney for the Seventh Judicial Circuit Court of Florida
- In office 1919–1921

Member of the Florida House of Representatives
- In office 1917

Personal details
- Born: October 6, 1891 New York City, U.S.
- Died: March 21, 1953 (aged 61) Key West, Florida, U.S.
- Party: Democratic
- Spouse: Alice Agee
- Children: 3
- Education: Yale University (BA); Stetson University (LLB)

Military service
- Allegiance: United States
- Branch/service: United States Navy
- Battles/wars: World War I

David Sholtz (October 6, 1891 – March 21, 1953) was the 26th Governor of Florida. Prior to serving as Governor he had been a state attorney serving Florida's 7th Judicial Circuit Court and previously a member of the Florida House of Representatives.

== Early life and education ==
Sholtz was born on October 6, 1891, in Brooklyn, New York, to Michael and Annie (Bloom) Sholtz who were both described as being Russian Jewish. David was one of three siblings in his family. His father, Michael, immigrated to the United States when he was 15.

Sholtz attended Public School #41 in Brooklyn and graduated from Boys High School in 1910. When David was in high school he was the editor of the school's publication and the manager of its baseball team. He was a member of the Arista honor society and was the founder of a fraternity there.

After graduating from high school he attended Yale University. After graduating from Yale, where he was a member of the Acacia fraternity, he earned a law degree from Stetson University Law School in 1914. This enabled him to become a Florida lawyer without having to take the bar examination, as Florida then adhered to the diploma privilege.

== Career ==
=== Early career ===
With his law degree, he started a law practice in Daytona Beach, Florida. Sholtz entered politics when he became a one-term member of the Florida House of Representatives in 1917, however Sholtz ended up resigning as he enlisted to serve in the U.S. Navy when the United States entered World War I. During the war he had the rank of ensign and served under the Censorship Board being stationed in Key West and Havana, Cuba.

After that, he was a State Attorney from 1919 to 1921 serving for the 7th Judicial Circuit, becoming the city judge of Daytona Beach in 1921. After serving as Daytona Beach's city judge he was the president of the Florida Chamber of Commerce from 1928 to 1929. His experiences meeting Floridians from a variety of different backgrounds as the president of the Florida Chamber of Commerce convinced him that he could be elected as governor.

=== 1932 gubernatorial campaign ===
When Sholtz ran for Governor, his platform included increasing government services, free school textbooks, 9-month school terms, back pay for teachers, workers compensation, increasing banking regulations, and more funding for the public welfare. Sholtz had no money for campaign advertisements apart from mailing a few campaign letters, which required him to go door-to-door for donations. He mainly used a flatbed truck with 2 loudspeakers mounted on it while driving across the state. A dynamic public speaker, he rarely used notes for speeches and his speaking abilities were comparable to Huey Long and while speaking he often gave an impression of authenticity.

His primary election opponent John W. Martin played up the fact that Sholtz was of Jewish ancestry in an anti-Semitic attack on him. It eventually became one of the most significant aspects of the campaign season. Martin even wrote to Germany in an attempt to get sworn depositions proving he was Jewish. Sholtz ended up ignoring the attacks that Martin made on him . In reality, Sholtz was an active member of an Episcopal Church in Daytona Beach. Sholtz's victory in the primary was unexpected at the time as most political analysts were expecting either Cary A. Hardee or John W. Martin, both former governors of Florida, to win the primary. The Florida Democratic primary was held on June 7, 1932. In the primary, Sholtz ended up in 2nd place out of 7 candidates.

Sholtz advanced to the runoff election for the primary that was held on June 28. In the runoff he faced off against former Governor Martin and Sholtz ended up winning the election.

During the general election in November he ran against Republican candidate William J. Howey, the mayor of Howey-in-the-Hills. David Sholtz ended up receiving 286,270 votes or 66.62% of the vote. Sholtz also ended up winning a majority of the vote in every county. While William J. Howey received 93,323 or 33.38% of the vote.

=== Governorship ===
==== Overview ====
Taking the oath on January 4, 1933, he became governor during the Great Depression. During his tenure as governor, he established the Florida Park Service and Florida Citrus Commission, passed a workers' compensation law, mandated free textbooks in public schools, and funded salaries for public school teachers. While in office, he was a strong advocate of governmental restructuring.

Sholtz is considered to be a New Deal Democrat.

==== Lynching of Claude Neal ====
During Sholtz's tenure as governor, the lynching of Claude Neal occurred and there was national attention surrounding the incident. Walter Francis White, the NAACP Secretary sent a telegram to Schultz on October 26, 1934, telling him that the mob who had abducted him was planning on burning him at a stake and that he rescue him and put him in a safe location. Sholtz responded saying that he couldn't send Florida National Guard troops to Greenwood without the Jackson County Sheriff, Flake Chambliss asking for the National Guard first; which Chambliss hadn't asked up until that point. After Neal's body was removed from where it was located, most of the mob surrounding him had left but a smaller mob had formed at close to noon during that day. The mob tried targeting local African-Americans that day and the police did not intervene because the mob threatened to beat anyone in the police force it came into contact with. The mayor of Marianna called Sholtz asking for assistance which he granted sending in the Florida National Guard to restore order and the mob dispersed.

==== Other events ====
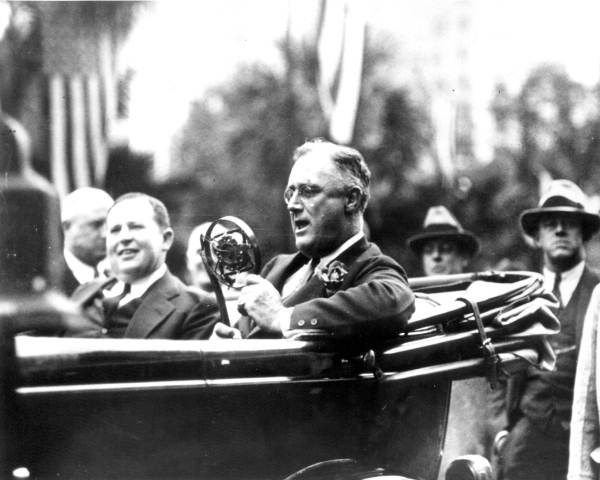
Sholtz (left) with then President-elect Franklin D. Roosevelt in Jacksonville, February 1933

During his first message to the state legislature he commended President Franklin D. Roosevelt, saying:

President Roosevelt has boldly shown the way to the nation and Congress has worked with him for the solution of national problems. I can only ask that you, within all Constitutional grounds, work with me in the solution of our state problem.

Also during his first state legislature message, Sholtz recommended reducing the cost of license tags to what he saw as a reasonable price of $5 along with a "conservation department for the state" to be established. He also wanted to have a balanced and well made budget for the state. Sholtz proposed that income received from car license taxes and a one mill school tax from construction along with the state's share of pari-mutuel betting could be used as a way to pay for the school fund allowing for teachers to be paid in regular money instead of scrip. He thought that the money generated from these 3 sources be enough to pay for teacher salaries and textbooks.

Sholtz managed to overcome the strong opposition publishers had to providing free public school textbooks. Publishers thought his plan was "socialistic" and tried to persuade members of the legislature to their side. Despite the publisher's resistance he managed to get it. Sholtz countered it successfully and managed to get it passed.

The relief programs he created did end up being popular. Towards the end of his administration, accusations of bribery along with in corruption in the gaming and racing commissions circulated, which hampered his reputation with Floridians.

=== Later life ===
After leaving the Governor's Mansion on January 5, 1937, Sholtz unsuccessfully ran for the U.S. Senate in 1938, losing the Democratic primary to Claude Pepper. He spent most of his time in New York after his term as governor, but he retained his residency in Florida. He died while visiting Key West, Florida in 1953 and is buried at the Cedar Hill Memory Gardens in Daytona Beach, Florida.

== Personal life ==
Sholtz was involved in freemasonry being a York and Scottish Rite Mason, rising to be a 33rd degree Mason. Along with freemasonry, he was a Shriner and a member of the Elks where he was elected to be the Grand Exalted Ruler. Dave Sholtz was the first Elk from the State of Florida to serve as Grand Exalted Ruler of the Elks, and held that office during the years 1936-1937. He was involved with the American Legion as well.

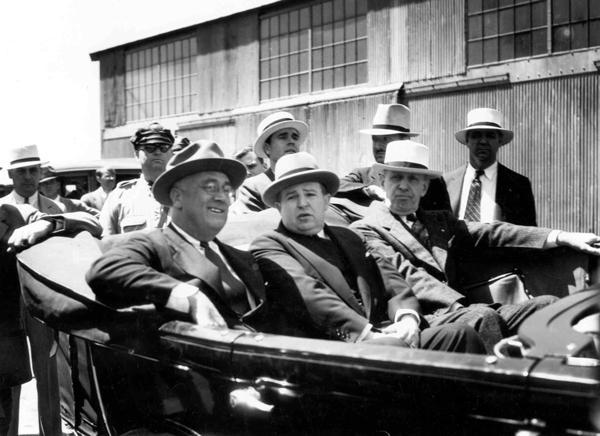
Sholtz with President Franklin D. Roosevelt (FDR) and Jacksonville Mayor John T. Alsop when FDR visited the city sometime during 1933–34.

David Sholtz married Alice May Agee in 1926 and had one child and adopted two children with her. Sholtz was a personal friend of President Franklin D. Roosevelt. He was described by those who knew him as having a kind, warm hearted and projecting personality. Sholtz was known to have had a summer home in Henderson County, North Carolina. During visits to his North Carolina summer house, Sholtz and his wife liked to keep a low profile.

Party political offices
Preceded by Doyle E. Carlton	Democratic nominee for Governor of Florida; 1932	Succeeded by Fred P. Cone
Political offices
Preceded by Doyle E. Carlton	Governor of Florida; 1933–1937	Succeeded by Fred P. Cone
