= Cary A. Hardee =

American politician (1876–1957)

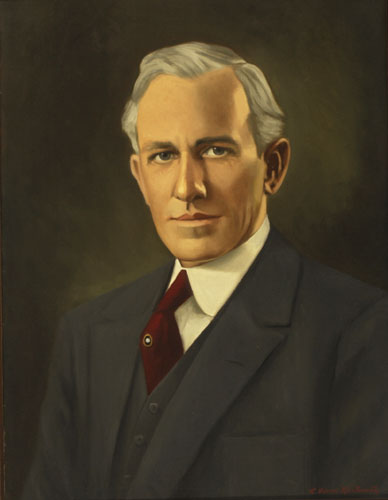

23rd Governor of Florida
- In office January 4, 1921 – January 6, 1925
- Preceded by: Sidney J. Catts
- Succeeded by: John W. Martin

Speaker of the Florida House of Representatives
- In office 1915–1917
- Preceded by: Ion Farris
- Succeeded by: George H. Wilder

Member of the Florida House of Representatives
- In office 1915–1919

Personal details
- Born: November 13, 1876 Taylor County, Florida, U.S.
- Died: November 21, 1957 (aged 81) Live Oak, Florida, U.S.
- Party: Democratic
- Spouse: Maude Randell Hardee

Cary Augustus Hardee (November 13, 1876 – November 21, 1957) was an American educator, lawyer, banker, and conservative politician who served as the 23rd governor of Florida.

== Biography ==
=== Early life and career ===
Born in Taylor County, Florida, he spent most of his life in Live Oak, Florida. He was a teacher until 1900 when he was admitted to the bar and began practicing law. Additionally, he was a banker, establishing the First National Bank of Live Oak in 1902 and later serving as its president. He also organized the Mayo State Bank and was president of the Branford State Bank.

=== Political career ===
In 1905 he became the state's attorney for the Third Judicial District. He served as a member of the Florida House of Representatives from 1915 to 1919, and was Speaker of the Florida House.

=== Gubernatorial campaign issues ===
Hardee identified his positions on the issues of better and more efficient government, taxation, waterways and roads, agriculture, and veterans' affairs in a 1920 newspaper article. He was elected in 1920.

=== Governorship ===
He took office as governor on January 4, 1921. During his term, the state adopted constitutional amendments that reapportioned the legislature and prohibited the levying of state income and inheritance taxes along with starting the first state gasoline tax. Six counties were created during his tenure as governor. He also halted the practice of leasing state prisoners out to private businesses, following the death of Martin Tabert. During his term as governor, electrocution became a legal method of execution in Florida.

Hardee was less willing to spend state funds than his predecessor, the populist Sidney Johnston Catts. During his tenure, the state cut the budgets of all three of Florida's state universities - the University of Florida, the Florida State College for Women, and Florida A&M University. Hardee particularly targeted Florida A&M, which due to segregation only served African-American students. Since he believed a more educated black populace would be more likely to leave the state in search of better opportunities, he instructed his appointees to the Florida Board of Control to abolish the liberal arts program at the school and convert it into a purely vocational college. FAMU president Nathan B. Young resisted these efforts, but was eventually forced to resign; in response, students at FAMU staged a violent strike that led to the destruction of multiple campus buildings.

He offered to send in National Guard troops in response to the Rosewood Massacre but the local sheriff refused the offer.

=== Post-governorship ===
Hardee left office on January 6, 1925. He ran for governor again in 1932, but lost the Democratic primary.

He was a banker in Live Oak until his death in 1957.

== Honors and memorials ==
Hardee County, Florida is named in his honor.

== Electoral history ==
1932 Florida Democratic gubernatorial primary
Party	Candidate	Votes	%
Democratic	John W. Martin	66,940	24.19
Democratic	David Sholtz	55,406	20.02
Democratic	Cary A. Hardee	50,427	18.22
Democratic	Stafford Caldwell	44,938	16.24
Democratic	Charles W. Durrance	36,291	13.12
Democratic	T. S. Hart	9,525	3.44
Democratic	Arthur Gomez	9,244	3.34
Democratic	J. Thomas Watson	3,949	1.43
Total votes		276,720	100.00

1920 Florida gubernatorial election
Party	Candidate	Votes	%	±%
Democratic	Cary A. Hardee	103,407	77.94%	
Republican	George E. Gay	23,788	17.93%	
Socialist	F.C. Whitaker	2,823	2.13%	
Independent	W.L. VanDuzer	2,654	2.00%	
Majority		79,619		
Turnout				
Democratic hold		Swing		

1920 Florida Democratic gubernatorial primary
Party	Candidate	Votes	%
Democratic	Cary A. Hardee	52,591	59.48
Democratic	Van C. Swearingen	30,240	34.20
Democratic	Lincoln Hulley	5,591	6.32
Total votes		88,422	100.00

Party political offices
Preceded by William V. Knott	Democratic nominee for Governor of Florida; 1920	Succeeded by John W. Martin
Political offices
Preceded by Sidney J. Catts	Governor of Florida; January 4, 1921 – January 6, 1925	Succeeded by John W. Martin
