= John W. Martin =

American politician (1884–1958)

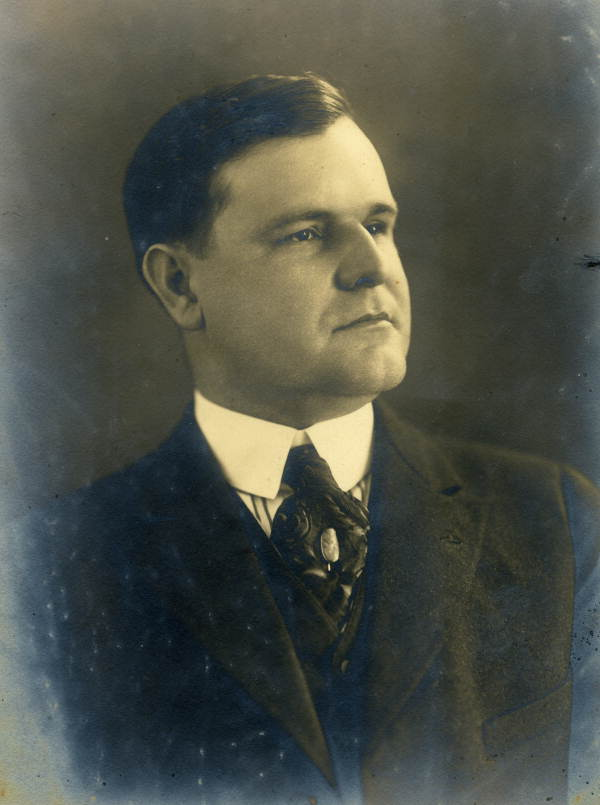

24th Governor of Florida
- In office January 6, 1925 – January 8, 1929
- Preceded by: Cary A. Hardee
- Succeeded by: Doyle E. Carlton

32nd Mayor of Jacksonville
- In office 1917–1923
- Preceded by: J. E. T. Bowden
- Succeeded by: John T. Alsop

Personal details
- Born: June 21, 1884 Plainfield, Florida, U.S.
- Died: February 22, 1958 (aged 73) St. Augustine, Florida, U.S.
- Party: Democratic
- Spouse: Lottie Wilt Pepper Martin

John Wellborn Martin (June 21, 1884 – February 22, 1958) was an American politician who served as the 24th Governor of Florida, from 1925 to 1929. He also served as the 32nd Mayor of Jacksonville, from 1917 to 1923. Born in Plainfield in Marion County, Florida, Martin and his family moved to Jacksonville in 1899. Despite only about four years of formal education, he studied law and was admitted to the Florida Bar in 1914. Three years later, Martin ran for Mayor of Jacksonville and easily defeated incumbent J. E. T. Bowden, becoming the city's youngest mayor at age 32. He was easily re-elected twice in landslide victories and served three consecutive terms.

Martin declined to seek a fourth term in 1923 and instead ran for Governor of Florida in 1924. In the Democratic Party primary, he defeated four other candidates, including former Governor Sidney Johnston Catts. With the Democratic primary then being tantamount to election, Martin won the general election with nearly 83% of the vote against Republican William R. O'Neal. During his tenure, tourism, land speculation, and road development increased, despite the collapse of the land boom in the mid-1920s. The contemporaneous Constitution of Florida barred Martin from seeking a second consecutive term in 1928. He unsuccessfully ran for United States Senator in 1928 and Governor of Florida again in 1932. Martin died on February 22, 1958, about a month after having a severe heart attack.

== Early life ==
Martin was born in Plainfield in Marion County, Florida, one of five children born to John M. Martin and Willie Owens Martin. His paternal grandfather was John Marshall Martin, a slaveowner who served in the Confederate Army and the Confederate Congress, and his maternal grandfather was James Byeram Owens, a slaveowner who served in the Provisional Congress of the Confederate States.

During his childhood, Martin worked on his father's plantation and received a country school education, but estimated that he had only about four years of formal education. Martin and his family moved to Jacksonville in 1899. He married Lottie Pepper in 1907. The couple had one child, John Wellborn Martin, Jr., but he died during infancy. Martin had studied law since his family moved to Jacksonville and passed the Florida Bar exam in 1914, before establishing a law career. Prior to seeking public office, Martin toured the state and gave a number of speeches in favor of President Woodrow Wilson's policies.

== Mayor of Jacksonville and Governor of Florida ==
In 1917, he was elected Mayor of Jacksonville at age 32, becoming the youngest mayor in the city's history. Martin easily defeated incumbent J. E. T. Bowden by a vote of 2,890 to 2,056. He would easily be re-elected twice, winning 14 out of 15 of the city's wards in his third and final campaign for the office. During his tenure as Mayor of Jacksonville, Martin supported a progressive program of public improvements and sought reform for the fire and police departments.

Toward the end of his third term as Mayor of Jacksonville, Martin announced he would not seek re-election and instead declared his candidacy for 1924 Florida gubernatorial election. In the Democratic Party on June 3, Martin defeated former Governor Sidney Johnston Catts, Frank E. Jennings, Worth W. Trammell (brother of Senator and former Governor Park Trammell), and Charles H. Spencer. There were 55,715 votes for Martin, 43,230 votes for Catts, 37,962 votes for Jennings, 8,381 votes for Trammell, and 1,408 votes for Spencer. Because no candidate received a majority, the second choice of Jennings, Trammell, and Spencer voters were added to the totals for Martin and Catts. Martin won with 73,054 votes versus 49,297 votes for Catts. With the Democratic primary then being tantamount to election, Martin won the general election. He defeated Republican William R. O'Neal by a vote of 84,181 to 17,499, a margin of 65.58%.

Martin was inaugurated on January 6, 1925, and served until January 8, 1929. On May 30, 1925, the Florida Legislature established Martin County – named after Governor Martin while he was in office – created from about 556 sq mi (1,440 km^{2}) of land from southern St. Lucie County and northern Palm Beach County; the city of Stuart was designated the county seat. Indian River County was established on the same day. Later in 1925, the state's newest counties were established – Gulf and Gilchrist. During his tenure, tourism and land speculation purchases increased, road and highway developments were advanced, and an industrial plant for physically disabled prisoners was created. Martin also advocated for state-funded public schools and for granting free schoolbooks to all students through sixth grade.

Despite the growth, Martin also presided over the collapse of the Florida land boom of the 1920s. In a failed attempt to fight bad publicity about real estate scams, Martin and a delegation went to the Waldorf Astoria Hotel, owned by T. Coleman du Pont (an investor in Addison Mizner's projects), in New York City and held a seminar called "The Truth About Florida". Two of the worst hurricanes in the history of the state – the 1926 Miami and 1928 Okeechobee hurricanes – also occurred during Martin's tenure. The former devastated the areas in the vicinity of Miami and towns along the western shores of Lake Okeechobee, such as Clewiston and Moore Haven, leaving at least 372 fatalities and up to $125 million (1926 USD) in damage. The hurricane also resulted in further discussion between Martin and officials across the state about drainage projects around Lake Okeechobee. However, disputes about financing the projects left many residents along the lake vulnerable to flooding. After wreaking havoc in coastal Palm Beach County, the 1928 hurricane caused Lake Okeechobee to breach the then-4 ft (1.2 m) mud dikes at its southeastern shores, inundating areas with as much as 20 ft (6.1 m) of water. The cities of Belle Glade, Chosen, Miami Locks (today Lake Harbor), Pahokee, and South Bay were devastated, with the loss of more than 2,500 lives. After personally assessing the damage with Florida Attorney General Fred Henry Davis, chief engineer Fred C. Elliott, and Florida Adjutant General Vivian B. Collins, Martin telegraphed all mayors of Florida cities to send aid to the victims. Discussion about drainage and dikes along Lake Okeechobee re-commenced, but the projects did not begin until after the passage of the Rivers and Harbors Act of 1930, after Martin left office.

== Post-governorship ==
The Florida Constitution at the time barred a governor from serving two consecutive terms. Martin was succeeded by Doyle E. Carlton in January 1929. Martin decided to run for United States Senator in 1928. However, he was defeated by incumbent Park Trammell in the Democratic primary, losing by a vote of 138,534 to 100,454. Martin made his final run for political office in 1932, seeking the governorship of Florida again. He received the most votes in a seven candidate field that included state's attorney David Sholtz and former Governor Cary A. Hardee. However, he garnered only 24.19% of the vote, well short of a majority. Martin thus advanced to a run-off election against Sholtz, but was defeated by a wide margin of 62.8%—37.2%.

After retiring from politics, Martin built his own house in Tallahassee in 1933, which has been listed as a National Historic Place since 1986. After living at the property for about seven or eight years, Martin sold the house to local developers in 1941. He returned to Jacksonville, where he continued to practice law and became an investment broker. Martin was appointed a co-trustee of the Florida East Coast Railway, along with former Senator Scott Loftin. Upon Loftin's death in 1953, Martin became the sole trustee. On February 22, 1958, Martin died of a heart attack at East Coast Hospital in St. Augustine. He was buried at Evergreen Cemetery in Jacksonville.

Party political offices
Preceded by Cary A. Hardee	Democratic nominee for Governor of Florida; 1924	Succeeded by Doyle E. Carlton
Political offices
Preceded by Cary A. Hardee	Governor of Florida; January 4, 1921 – January 6, 1925	Succeeded by Doyle E. Carlton
Preceded by J. E. T. Bowden	Mayor of Jacksonville, Florida; January 4, 1918 – January 6, 1920	Succeeded by John T. Alsop
