= Sidney Johnston Catts =

22nd Governor of Florida

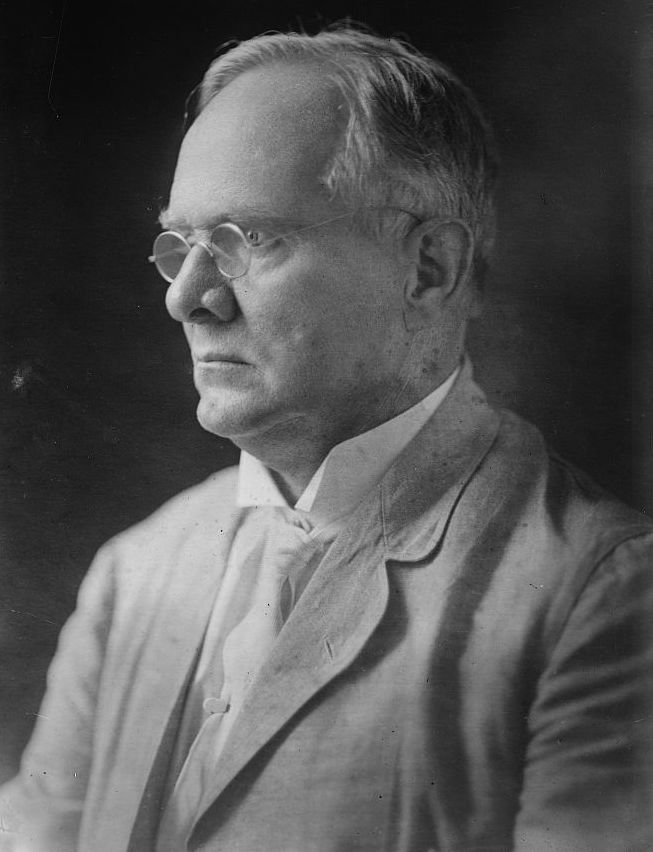
- Catts in 1916

22nd Governor of Florida
- In office January 2, 1917 – January 4, 1921
- Preceded by: Park Trammell
- Succeeded by: Cary A. Hardee

Personal details
- Born: July 31, 1863 Pleasant Hill, Alabama, C.S.A
- Died: March 9, 1936 (aged 72) DeFuniak Springs, Florida, U.S.
- Party: Democratic
- Other political affiliations: Prohibition
- Spouse: Alice May Campbell
- Children: 4
- Parents: Samuel W. Catts (father); Adeline Rebecca Smyly (mother)
- Relatives: William D. Bloxham (first cousin)

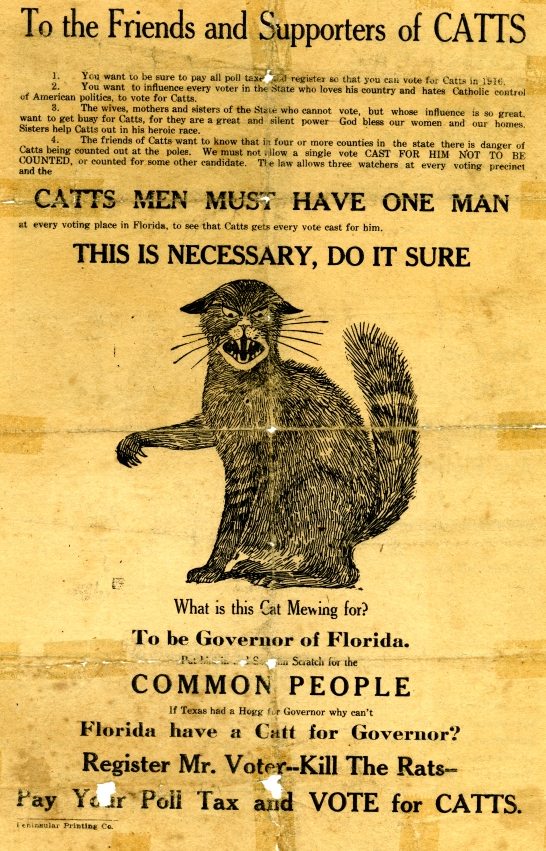
Campaign poster from the 1916 gubernatorial election.

Sidney Johnston Catts (July 31, 1863 – March 9, 1936) was an American politician, businessman, and anti-Catholic activist. He served as the 22nd governor of Florida from 1917 to 1921 as a member of the Prohibition Party, despite being a Democrat for most of his career. He became involved in criminal procedures due to his activities as governor and for business activities. Although he was later acquitted, he went bankrupt in the process.

== Early life ==
Sidney Johnston Catts was born on his father's plantation in Pleasant Hill, Alabama on July 31, 1863, to Adeline Rebecca Smyly and Samuel W. Catts, a Confederate captain, and was named after Confederate General Albert Sidney Johnston. In 1866, his nurse accidentally stabbed one of his eyes with a pair of scissors while cutting pictures causing him to lose sight in it.

He earned a law degree from Cumberland School of Law at Cumberland University in 1882. In 1885, he was ordained as a pastor and worked in Alabama until 1910, when he moved to Florida. He later became an insurance salesman and then a teacher. In November 1886, he married Alice May Campbell, a relative of Lord Colin Campbell.

== Career ==
=== U.S. House of Representatives campaigns ===
In March 1904, Catts announced that he would seek the Democratic nomination against James Thomas Heflin to represent Alabama's 5th congressional district in the United States House of Representatives. During the campaign Catts gave $250 to another politician to canvass a county, but that politician later placed a bet using the money that Heflin would win. Heflin defeated Catts in the primary and following his defeat Catts endorsed Heflin.

On April 7, 1930, he announced that he would seek the Democratic nomination in Florida's 3rd congressional district, but was defeated by incumbent Representative Tom Yon in the Democratic primary.

=== 1916 gubernatorial campaign ===
In 1914, Catts announced that he would run for the Democratic nomination for governor of Florida. Catts was the first political candidate to campaign using an automobile in Florida (a Ford Model T). This gave him an advantage by enabling him to visit areas in the state that were isolated and avoided by other candidates who preferred to campaign in towns that were close to or on railroads. For many in the state, it would have been the first time they had seen a car. He competed against William V. Knott who called for "economy in government," equalizing tax laws, making pensions for Civil War veterans bigger and improving roads. Catts mounted a loudspeaker to his car as well. He claimed that a group of Catholics in Apalachicola were planning to assassinate him and that he needed firearms handy as a result.

==== Democratic primary and recount ====
Catts contested the Democratic Party's primary that was held on June 6, 1916. The Bryan Primary law required that voting provided for a first and second choice ballot in the case of a runoff. Many voters didn't understand the procedure and ended up casting only first choice ballots. Some of the election officials would insist later on that voters were not aware the second choice votes were supposed to be counted as well. Both Catts and Knott accused each other of voter fraud. When all ballots were counted it was announced that Catts received 33,429 votes to Knott's 33,169. Knott went to court and demanded a recount, while Catts asserted that he would run in the general election no matter what the courts decided. The Florida Supreme Court ruled on August 9 that Knott had won the primary by 21 votes. In response, on October 10 Catts sought the nomination of the Prohibition Party, which held a convention in late June and nominated him for governor.

After the primary, he took 7 trips across the state between June and November. During this time most of his messaging from prior to the primaries remained the same; however, he additionally attacked the Catholic church claiming that they had provided funds that were used for the recount.

=== Governorship ===
==== Inauguration ====
Catts was inaugurated as governor on January 2, 1917. During the parade, cars were used for the first time and replace buggies that were previously used, with 50 cars participating in the parade. The Model T that Catts had used was adorned with a sign saying: "THIS IS THE CAR THAT GOT ME HERE" and his son Rozier would drive the car for him. Democratic justices of the Florida Supreme Court would refuse to take their places that were designated in the parade until Catts' attorney, W.W. Flournoy persuaded them to. The inauguration itself would be the first Florida inauguration to be filmed. In his inauguration speech, Catts stated:

Your triumph is no less in this good hour in beautiful Florida, for you have withstood the onslaughts of the county and state political rings, the corporations, the railroads, the fierce opposition of the press and organization of the negro voters of this state against you and the power of the Roman Catholic hierarchy against you. Yet over all of these the common people of Florida, the everyday cracker people have triumphed.

Towards the end of the day, an inaugural ball and banquet would be held. He and his wife would refuse to participate in the inaugural ball. Catts would opt out of having the traditional alcoholic punch that was served at the inaugural banquet.

==== Tenure ====
During his first message to the state legislature Catts would call for statewide prohibition, abolition of the convict lease system, an inheritance tax that would be graduated, more power for the state tax commission to investigate large corporations that were avoiding taxation, manual labor colleges for boys and girls, elimination of the Bryan primary law, taxation of church property and adoption of a guarantee law for banks. His address to the legislature was described as being well received by the press in Florida. The 1917 session of the state legislature would accomplish close to nothing in the end.

At the onset of World War I as Florida teemed with a never-before-seen wave of Anti-German sentiment, Catts attempted to exploit this to further his own anti-Catholic and racist agendas. The governor publicly theorized that the German-American monks of Saint Leo Abbey in Pasco County were planning to arm Florida's black community for a popular revolt in favor of Kaiser Wilhelm II, after which Pope Benedict XV would take over Florida and move the Holy See to nearby San Antonio (itself a largely German and Catholic community) and close all Protestant churches. These speeches caused some German-Americans in the area to migrate to other parts of the United States. The abbot of St. Leo, Right Rev. Charles Mohr, OSB, published several dignified responses to these conspiracy theories. In support of the St. Leo monks, many Pasco County Protestants made it a point to appear in public with local Catholics. Because of the backlash, Catts was forced to tone down his rhetoric when in the area.

In April 1917, he admitted that he sent an insulting letter to Attorney General Thomas Watt Gregory asking for Black Campbell, his brother-in-law who was in federal prison due to stealing $1,000 while serving as a bookkeeper in an Alabama bank, to be given a pardon.

In 1919 Catts publicly labeled black residents as part of "an inferior race," and refused to criticize two lynchings. He was quoted in the press as saying that "only the vagrant, vagabond, worthless negro is lynched". When the NAACP complained about these lynchings, Catts wrote denouncing the organization and blacks generally, declaring that "Your Race is always harping on the disgrace it brings to the state by a concourse of white people taking revenge for the dishonoring of a white woman, when if you would . . . [teach] your people not to kill our white officers and disgrace our white women, you would keep down a thousand times greater disgrace."

During April 1919, Catts would request the US Department of Labor abolish the Florida branch of the Division of Negro Economics. He would also say at the same time that he wanted the US Employment Service's head to be replaced with a personal friend of his. He accused the black officers of the Division of inciting race riots and also said they encouraged miscegenation.

Mulberry in Polk County witnessed strikes from phosphate miners starting in May 1919. 3,000 workers who were both black and white ended up participating. Catts along with Sheriff Logan toured the strike zone. After doing the tour he made an announcement saying he was in support of those who were striking. The mining companies responded to strikes by importing black laborers as replacements for those who were on strike. Miners who were on strike at one point ambushed a car convoy carrying these workers in the outskirts of Bartow killing a strikebreaker and wounding a mine guard who was a deputy sheriff. In another significant event during the strikes, a group of 4 white guards from Prairie Pebble Mine fired on Mulberry, resulting in the deaths of 3 African Americans. Sheriff Logan arrested and jailed the guards in Bartow. Catts ended up removing Logan from his office because he felt he did not do enough to prevent violence in the first place.

== Later life ==
Catts was ineligible to run for reelection in 1920, and he ran for the Democratic nomination for U.S. Senate, but lost by a large margin to incumbent Democratic Senator Duncan U. Fletcher.

On April 14, 1921, the Florida Senate voted to approve a resolution that would order a legislative investigation into Catts' pardons and appointments due to rumors about him accepting bribes in exchange for them and the state house voted to approve it four days later. On May 5 he was indicted by the Bradford county grand jury for accepting a $700 bribe to pardon J. J. Coleman, who was given life imprisonment in 1918 for the murder of a deputy sheriff, but resisted arrest for five days before surrendering. On May 19 a federal warrant against Catts was issued for the involuntary servitude of two black people forced to work on his plantation and he was arrested two days later and stated that at that time, "My enemies won't let me alone". While on bond awaiting trial Catts spoke at an Independence Day celebration in Macon, Georgia despite protests from members of the board of aldermen who stated that it was improper to have somebody that was indicted for criminal charges speak. On August 16, 1921, he stated that he was confident that he would be acquitted on all charges. In November his initial indictment was recharged and two other indictments for peonage were also issued. On May 16, 1922, his defense's motion to dismiss the indictments against Catts' bribery charges was accepted by the judge. On July 21 he filed a petition of voluntary bankruptcy as he had $44,000 in liabilities and less than $2,000 in assets. On November 20 he was acquitted by an all white jury for the involuntary servitude and bribery charges and the federal charges against him were later dropped.

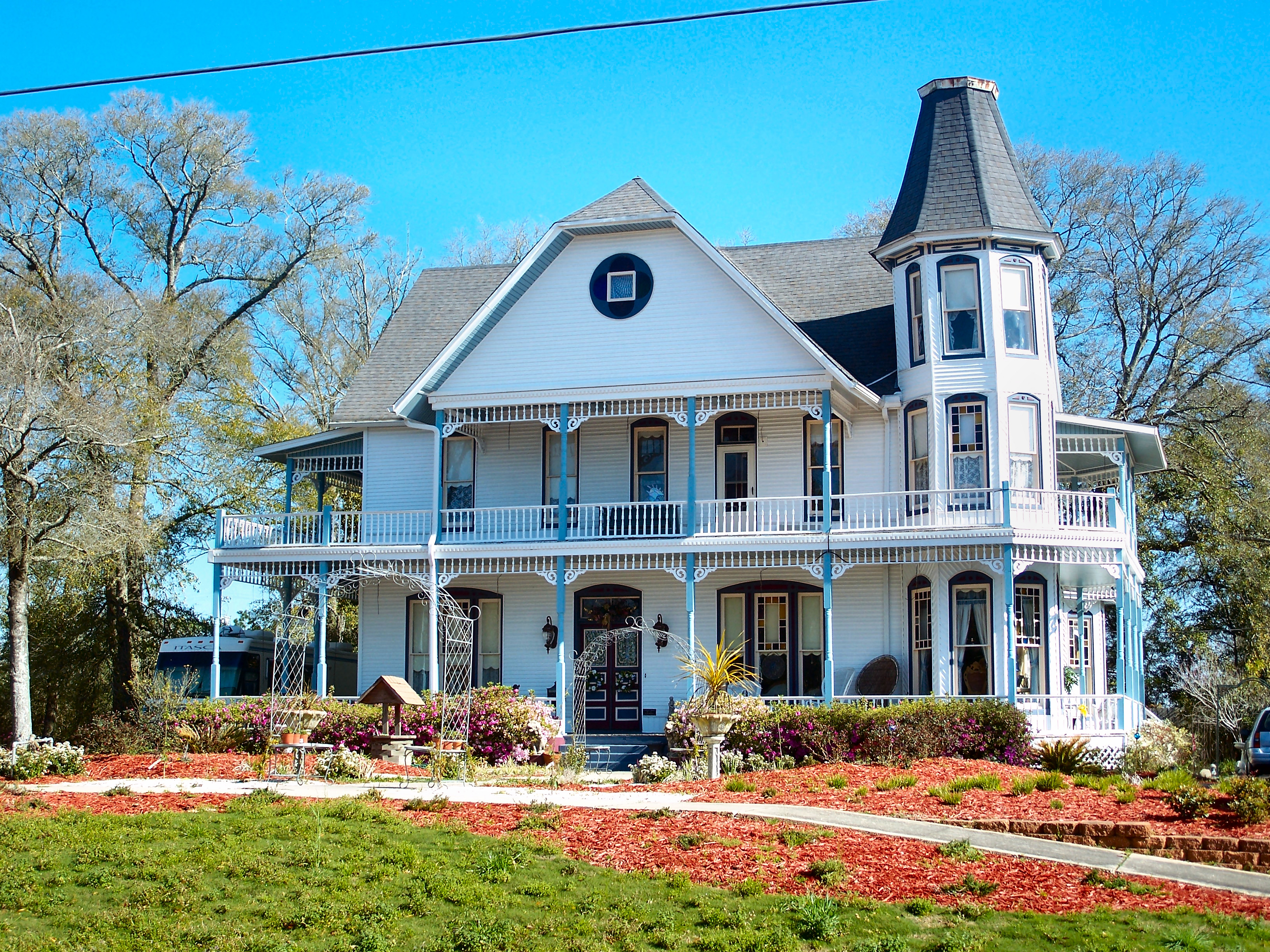
Catts' home Sun Bright in DeFuniak Springs, Florida.

Shortly after he left office he became involved in a company with F. L. Jester and in September 1921, he was called before a superior court for questioning for his involvement in a fraudulent business.

Catts ran for the Democratic nomination for governor in 1924 and 1928, but lost both times. During the 1928 presidential election he was one of the Democrats who supported Republican Herbert Hoover over Democrat Al Smith, who was Catholic.

On April 9, 1929, Catts was indicted by a federal grand jury in Jacksonville for aiding and abetting in counterfeiting money with multiple other people in a plan to distribute $1,000,000 in counterfeited money. His first trial in October resulted in a mistrial and was acquitted at his second trial.

Catts spent the final 8 years of his life in DeFuniak Springs where he became involved with real estate and farming.

On March 9, 1936, Catts died at his home, Sun Bright, in DeFuniak Springs, Florida at the age of 72. In 1979, the house he lived in from 1924 to 1936 was added to the National Register of Historic Places.

== Personal life ==
His wife Alice gave birth to a son, Sidney J. Catts Jr. on July 22, 1894, in Fort Deposit, Alabama. Catts Jr. would become a lawyer and eventually go into politics just like his father did. One of his sons, Rozier would eventually marry a Catholic woman from Key West. Catts would accept her as part of the family and say that any father should welcome the wife of his son no matter what her religion is. When Catts moved back to DeFuniak Springs for the final 8 years of his life, he was known to distill and drink peach brandy.

Catts was involved with Freemasonry. He was also a Woodman of the World and a member of the Knights of Pythias.

== Electoral history ==
Sidney Johnston Catts electoral history

1916 Florida gubernatorial election
Party	Candidate	Votes	%	±%
Prohibition	Sidney Johnston Catts	39,546	47.71%	+45.52%
Democratic	William V. Knott	27,946	36.61%	−43.81%
Republican	George W. Allen	10,333	12.47%	+7.01%
Socialist	C.C. Allen	2,470	2.98%	−4.17%
Independent	Noel A. Mitchell	193	0.23%	+0.23%
Total votes		82,885	100.00%	

1920 Florida Senate Democratic primary
Party	Candidate	Votes	%
Democratic	Duncan U. Fletcher (incumbent)	62,304	71.36%
Democratic	Sidney Johnston Catts	25,007	28.64%
Total votes		87,311	100.00%

1924 Florida gubernatorial Democratic primary
Party	Candidate	Round 1			Round 2	
Party	Candidate	Votes	%	Transfer	Votes	%
Democratic	John W. Martin	55,715	37.98%	+ 17,339	73,054	59.71%
Democratic	Sidney Johnson Catts	43,230	29.47%	+ 6,067	49,297	40.29%
Democratic	Frank E. Jennings	37,962	25.88%	37,962	Eliminated	
Democratic	Worth W. Trammell	8,381	5.71%	8,381	Eliminated	
Democratic	Charles H. Spencer	1,408	0.96%	1,408	Eliminated	
Total votes					132,250	100.0%

Party political offices
Preceded by J. W. Bingham	Prohibition nominee for Governor of Florida; 1916	Succeeded by None
Political offices
Preceded by Park Trammell	Governor of Florida; January 2, 1917 – January 4, 1921	Succeeded by Cary A. Hardee
