= List of justices of the Supreme Court of Florida =

The Supreme Court of Florida is the highest judicial body in the state and sits at the apex of the Florida State Courts System. Its membership consists of seven justices who are appointed by the Governor of Florida to 6-year terms and remain in office if retained in a general election near the end of each term. The seven justices elect one member from among themselves to serve as the chief for a two-year term beginning July 1st on even-numbered years. The Florida Constitution mandates that justices retire when they reach the age of 75.

== List of justices ==
- * denotes justices who served as chief justice for at least part of their tenure on the court while denotes currently-serving justices.

No.	Justice	Assumed office	Vacated office	Succeeded	Appointed by	Reason for leaving	Notes
1	Thomas Douglas* (1790–1855)	January 1846	1851	Inaugural	Legislature		
2	Thomas Baltzell* (1804–1866)	January 1846	1851	Inaugural	Legislature		
3	George S. Hawkins (1808–1878)	January 1846	1851	Inaugural	Legislature		
4	George W. MacRae (1802–1858)	January 4, 1847	January 7, 1848	Inaugural	Legislature		
5	Joseph B. Lancaster (1790–1856)	January 10, 1848	1853	Inaugural	Legislature		
6	Walker Anderson* (1801–1857)	January 1, 1851	May 4, 1853	Inaugural	Legislature	Resigned	
7	Leslie A. Thompson (1806–1874)	January 1, 1851	1853	Inaugural	Legislature	Defeated	
8	Albert G. Semmes (1810–1883)	January 1, 1851	1853	Inaugural	Legislature		
9	Benjamin D. Wright (1799–1874)	May 24, 1853	1853	Inaugural	Legislature	Defeated	
1	Thomas Douglas* (1637–1715)	1854	September 11, 1855	Inaugural	Direct election	Died in office	
2	Thomas Baltzell* (1804–1866)	1854	1859	Inaugural	Direct election	Defeated	
10	Charles H. DuPont* (1805–1877)	1854	1868	Inaugural	Direct election		
11	Bird M. Pearson* (1803–1859)	1856	1859	Inaugural	Direct election	Did not run for reelection	
12	William A. Forward (1812–1865)	1860	1865	Inaugural	Direct election	Did not run for reelection	
13	David S. Walker (1815–1891)	1860	1865	Inaugural	Direct election	Resigned	
14	Augustus Maxwell* (1820–1903)	1865	1866	Inaugural	William Marvin	Resigned	
15	James McNair Baker (1821–1892)	1865	1868	Inaugural	David S. Walker		
16	Samuel J. Douglas (1812–1873)	1866	1868	Inaugural	David S. Walker		
17	Ossian B. Hart (1821–1874)	1868	1873	Inaugural	Harrison Reed	Elected Governor of Florida	
18	James Westcott III (1838–1887)	1868	January 7, 1885	Inaugural	Harrison Reed	Resigned	
19	Edwin M. Randall* (1822–1895)	January 1869	January 7, 1885	Inaugural	Harrison Reed	Resigned	
20	Franklin D. Fraser (1819–1879)	January 16, 1873	May 1874	Hart	Ossian B. Hart	Resigned	
21	Robert B. Van Valkenburgh (1821–1888)	May 20, 1874	August 1, 1888	Fraser		Died in office	
22	George G. McWhorter (1833–1891)	January 13, 1885	July 1, 1887	Randall	Edward A. Perry	Resigned	
23	George P. Raney (1845–1911)	January 13, 1885	May 31, 1894	Westcott	Edward A. Perry	Resigned	
14	Augustus Maxwell* (1820–1903)	July 1, 1887	1890	McWhorter		Did not run for re-election	
24	Henry L. Mitchell (1831–1903)	August 7, 1888	January 1, 1891	Van Valkenburgh		Resigned	
25	R. Fenwick Taylor* (1849–1928)	January 1, 1891	February 28, 1925	Mitchell	Francis P. Fleming	Retired	
26	Milton H. Mabry (1851–1919)	January 1891	1903	Maxwell	Direct election	Did not run for reelection	
27	Benjamin S. Liddon (1853–1909)	June 1, 1894	January 1897	Raney		Resigned	
28	Francis B. Carter (1861–1937)	January 11, 1897	May 25, 1905	Liddon	William D. Bloxham	Resigned	
29	Thomas M. Shackleford (1859–1927)	December 1, 1902	September 1, 1917	Inaugural	William Sherman Jennings	Resigned	
30	Robert S. Cockrell (1866–1957)	December 1, 1902	January 2, 1917	Inaugural	William Sherman Jennings	Defeated	
31	Evelyn C. Maxwell (1863–1954)	December 1, 1902	February 15, 1904	Inaugural	William Sherman Jennings	Resigned	
32	William A. Hocker (1844–1918)	January 6, 1903	January 5, 1915	Mabry		Did not run for reelection	
33	James B. Whitfield (1860–1948)	February 15, 1904	January 4, 1943	Maxwell	William Sherman Jennings	Retired	
34	Charles B. Parkhill (1859–1933)	May 25, 1905	January 1912	Carter		Resigned	
35	W. H. Ellis (1867–1948)	January 5, 1915	November 1, 1938	Hocker	Direct election	Retired	
36	Jefferson B. Browne* (1857–1937)	January 2, 1917	May 20, 1925	Cockrell	Direct election	Resigned	
37	Thomas F. West (1874–1931)	September 1, 1917	December 3, 1925	Shackleford	Sidney Johnston Catts	Resigned	
38	William Glenn Terrell* (1878–1964)	May 15, 1923	January 12, 1964	Parkhill		Died in office	
39	Louie Willard Strum (1890–1954)	March 2, 1925	March 5, 1931	Taylor		Appointed to Federal District Court	
40	Armstead Brown (1875–1951)	July 1, 1925	December 1, 1946	Browne	John W. Martin	Retired	
41	Rivers H. Buford (1878–1959)	December 4, 1925	April 3, 1948	West	John W. Martin	Retired	
42	Fred Henry Davis (1894–1937)	March 9, 1931	June 20, 1937	Strum	Doyle E. Carlton	Died in office	
43	Roy H. Chapman (1883–1952)	June 23, 1937	August 9, 1952	Davis	Fred P. Cone	Died in office	
44	Elwyn Thomas (1894–1971)	November 1, 1938	January 7, 1969	Ellis	Direct election	Retired	
45	Alto Adams (1899–1988)	November 25, 1940	October 22, 1951	Inaugural	Fred P. Cone	Resigned	
46	Harold Sebring* (1898–1968)	January 5, 1943	September 15, 1955	Whitfield	Direct election	Appointed Dean of Stetson College of Law	
47	Paul D. Barns (1894–1973)	December 2, 1946	September 1, 1949	Brown	Direct election	Retired	
48	T. Frank Hobson (1900–1966)	April 6, 1948	February 13, 1962	Buford	Millard F. Caldwell	Retired	
49	B. K. Roberts* (1907–1999)	September 1, 1949	December 1, 1976	Barns	Fuller Warren	Retired	
50	John Mathews (1892–1955)	October 23, 1951	April 29, 1955	Adams	Fuller Warren	Died in office	
51	E. Harris Drew (1903–1978)	August 18, 1952	January 5, 1971	Chapman	Fuller Warren	Retired	
52	B. Campbell Thornal (1908–1970)	May 9, 1955	November 4, 1970	Mathews		Died in office	
53	Stephen C. O'Connell* (1916–2001)	October 21, 1955	October 15, 1967	Sebring	LeRoy Collins	Appointed president of the University of Florida	
54	Millard Caldwell* (1897–1984)	February 14, 1962	January 7, 1969	Hobson		Mandatory retirement	
55	Richard Ervin* (1905–2004)	January 17, 1964	January 6, 1975	Terrell		Retired	
45	Alto Adams (1899–1988)	November 13, 1967	August 1, 1968	O'Connell	Claude R. Kirk Jr.	Resigned	
56	Wade L. Hopping (1931–2009)	August 1, 1968	January 7, 1969	Adams	Claude R. Kirk Jr.	Defeated	
57	Vassar B. Carlton* (1912–2005)	January 7, 1969	February 28, 1974	Hopping	Direct election	Retired	
58	James C. Adkins* (1915–1994)	January 7, 1969	January 6, 1987	Caldwell	Direct election	Mandatory retirement	
59	Joseph A. Boyd Jr.* (1916–2007)	January 7, 1969	January 6, 1987	Thomas	Direct election	Mandatory retirement	
60	David McCain (1931–1986)	December 14, 1970	August 31, 1975	Thornal	Claude R. Kirk Jr.	Resigned before impeachment	
61	Hal P. Dekle (1917–2005)	January 5, 1971	April 30, 1975	Drew	Direct election	Resigned before impeachment	
62	Ben Overton* (1926–2012)	March 27, 1974	January 4, 1999	Carlton	Reubin Askew	Mandatory retirement	
63	Arthur J. England Jr.* (1932–2013)	January 8, 1975	August 9, 1981	Ervin	Direct election	Resigned	
64	Alan C. Sundberg* (1933–2002)	June 2, 1975	September 15, 1982	Dekle	Reubin Askew	Resigned	
65	Joseph W. Hatchett (1932–2021)	September 2, 1975	July 18, 1979	McCain	Reubin Askew	Appointed to the United States Court of Appeals for the Eleventh Circuit	
66	Frederick B. Karl (1924–2013)	January 4, 1977	April 5, 1978	Roberts	Direct election	Resigned	
67	James E. Alderman* (1936–2021)	April 5, 1978	August 31, 1985	Karl		Resigned	
68	Parker Lee McDonald* (1924–2017)	October 26, 1979	May 31, 1994	Hatchett		Retired	
69	Raymond Ehrlich* (1918–2015)	December 3, 1981	January 7, 1991	England	Bob Graham	Mandatory retirement	
70	Leander J. Shaw Jr.* (1930–2015)	January 10, 1983	January 6, 2003	Sundberg		Mandatory retirement	
71	Rosemary Barkett* (born 1939)	November 15, 1985	April 21, 1994	Alderman	Bob Graham	Appointed to the United States Court of Appeals for the Eleventh Circuit	
72	Stephen H. Grimes* (1927–2021)	January 30, 1987	November 17, 1997	Adkins	Bob Martinez	Mandatory retirement	
73	Gerald Kogan* (1933–2021)	January 30, 1987	December 31, 1998	Boyd	Bob Martinez	Retired	
74	Major B. Harding* (born 1935)	January 28, 1991	August 31, 2002	Ehrlich	Lawton Chiles	Retired	
75	Harry Lee Anstead* (born 1937)	August 29, 1994	January 5, 2009	Barkett	Lawton Chiles	Mandatory retirement	
76	Charles T. Wells* (born 1939)	June 9, 1994	March 3, 2009	McDonald	Lawton Chiles	Mandatory retirement	
77	Barbara Pariente* (born 1948)	December 10, 1997	January 8, 2019	Grimes	Lawton Chiles	Mandatory retirement	
78	R. Fred Lewis* (born 1947)	December 7, 1998	January 8, 2019	Kogan	Lawton Chiles	Mandatory retirement	
79	Peggy Quince* (born 1948)	January 5, 1999	January 8, 2019	Overton	Lawton Chiles / Jeb Bush	Mandatory retirement	
80	Raoul G. Cantero III (born 1960)	July 10, 2002	September 6, 2008	Harding	Jeb Bush	Returned to private practice	
81	Kenneth B. Bell (born 1956)	January 7, 2003	October 1, 2008	Shaw	Jeb Bush	Returned to private practice	
82	Charles Canady* (born 1954)	August 28, 2008	December 31, 2025	Cantero	Charlie Crist	Retired	
83	Ricky Polston* (born 1955)	October 1, 2008	March 31, 2023	Bell	Charlie Crist	Resigned	
84	Jorge Labarga* (born 1952)	January 2, 2009		Anstead	Charlie Crist		
85	James E. C. Perry (born 1944)	March 11, 2009	December 30, 2016	Wells	Charlie Crist	Mandatory retirement	
86	C. Alan Lawson (born 1961)	December 31, 2016	August 31, 2022	Perry	Rick Scott	Retired	
87	Barbara Lagoa (born 1967)	January 9, 2019	December 6, 2019	Lewis	Ron DeSantis	Appointed to the United States Court of Appeals for the Eleventh Circuit	
88	Robert J. Luck (born 1979)	January 14, 2019	November 19, 2019	Pariente	Ron DeSantis	Appointed to the United States Court of Appeals for the Eleventh Circuit	
89	Carlos G. Muñiz* (born 1969)	January 22, 2019		Quince	Ron DeSantis		
90	John D. Couriel (born 1978)	June 1, 2020		Lagoa	Ron DeSantis		
91	Jamie Grosshans (born 1978/1979)	September 14, 2020		Luck	Ron DeSantis		
92	Renatha Francis (born 1976/1977)	September 1, 2022		Lawson	Ron DeSantis		
93	Meredith Barrios (born 1983)	May 25, 2023		Polston	Ron DeSantis		
94	Adam Tanenbaum (born 1972)	January 14, 2026		Canady	Ron DeSantis		

== See also ==
- Florida Constitution
- Government of Florida
- Judiciary of Florida
