= Florida Constitutional Convention of 1838 =

Florida convention for statehood

Florida Constitutional Convention of 1838 was convened on December 3, 1838, to fulfill the requirement for a United States territory being admitted to the union as a state. An act was passed by the Florida Territorial Council in 1838, and approved by Governor Richard Keith Call, calling for the election of delegates in October 1838 to a convention to be held at St. Joseph, Florida.

The delegates were to draft a constitution and bill of rights for the Territory of Florida. The Constitutional Convention convened with Robert R. Reid presiding as president and Joshua Knowles secretary. The work of the convention was carried out by eighteen committees, whose members were familiar with that particular area of government. The process was a relatively simple one, since they used the constitutions of several other Southern states as models. Only on the subject of banking did much debate take place. The Convention adjourned sine die on January 11, 1839.

A handwritten copy of the 1838 Constitution or "Form of Government for the People of Florida," signed by Convention President, Robert Raymond Reid, and Convention Secretary, Joshua Knowles resides at the State Archives of Florida. Considered "a secretary's copy" this document is the only known copy of the 1838 Constitution. The original Constitution, signed by all the delegates, has never been found. The preamble to the Constitution of 1838:

We, the People of the Territory of Florida, by our Delegates in Convention, assembled at the City of St. Joseph, on Monday the 3d day of December, A.D. 1838, and of the Independence of the United States the sixty-third year, having and claiming the right of admission into the Union, as one of the United States of America, consistent with the principles of the Federal Constitution, and by virtue of the Treaty of Amity, Settlement, and Limits between the United States of America and the King of Spain, ceding the Provinces of East and West Florida to the United States; in order to secure to ourselves and our posterity the enjoyment of all the rights of life, liberty, and property, and the pursuit of happiness, do mutually agree, each with the other, to form ourselves into a Free and Independent State, by the name of the State of Florida.

== Delegates ==
This is a list of delegates to the Florida Constitutional Convention held in St. Joseph, Florida, 1838—1839:

- Richard C. Allen, Calhoun County
- Walker Anderson, Escambia County
- Thomas Baltzell, Jackson County
- C. E. Bartlett, Franklin County
- Abraham Bellamy, Jefferson County
- Samuel C. Bellamy, Jackson County
- Edmund Bird, Alachua County
- Thomas M. Blount, Escambia County
- Wilson Brooks, Columbia County
- Thomas Brown, Leon County
- Joseph B. Browne, Monroe County
- Edward C. Cabell, Jefferson County
- John G. Cooper Nassau County
- Alexander W. Crichton, Duval County
- William P. Duval, Calhoun County
- Richard Fitzpatrick, Dade County
- Isaac Garasson, Alachua County
- Samuel Y. Garey, Duval County
- William Haddock, Nassau County
- William B. Hooker, Hamilton County
- John M. G. Hunter, Gadsden County
- Edwin T. Jenckes, St. Johns County
- David Levy Yulee St. Johns, County
- Richard H. Long, Jackson County
- John W. Malone, Gadsden County
- William Marvin, Monroe County
- Banks Meacham, Gadsden County
- Richard J. Mays, Madison County
- Joseph McCants, Jefferson County
- Daniel G. McLean, Walton County
- George E. McClellan, Columbia County
- John C. McGehee, Madison County
- John L. McKinnon Walton County
- Jackson Morton, Escambia County
- Samuel Parkhill, Leon County
- John M. Partridge Jefferson County
- Leigh Read, Leon County
- Robert R. Reid, St. Johns County
- Stephen J. Roche, Washington County
- E. Robbins, Washington County
- Jose S. Sanchez St. Johns County
- Albert G. Semmes, Franklin County
- Samuel B. Stephens, Gadsden County
- John Taylor, Leon County
- Leslie A. Thompson, Leon County
- George Taliaferro Ward, Leon County
- Joseph B. Watts, Hamilton County
- John F. Webb, Columbia County
- James D. Westcott, Leon County
- E. K. White, Alachua County
- William H. Williams, Mosquito County
- Alfred L. Woodward, Jackson County
- Oliver Woods, Duval County
- Benjamin D. Wright, Escambia County
- William Wyatt, Leon County

== See also ==
- Constitution of Florida
- Florida Constitutional Convention of 1885
