= Leslie A. Thompson =

American judge (1806–1874)

Leslie Atchinson Thompson
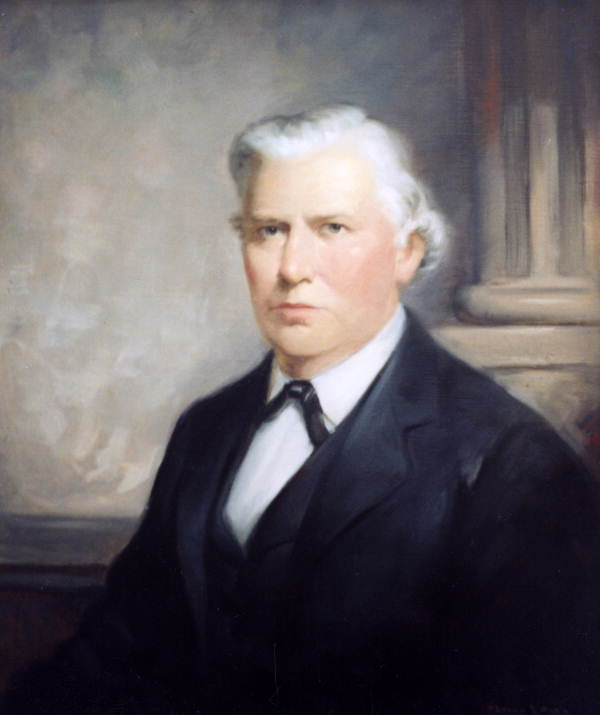
- Portrait of Florida Supreme Court Justice Leslie A. Thompson (circa 1851)

Member of the Texas House of Representatives from the 35th district
- In office July 7, 1856 – November 2, 1857
- Preceded by: Lorenzo Sherwood
- Succeeded by: Thomas Miller Joseph

Justice of the Florida Supreme Court
- In office 1851–1853
- Succeeded by: Thomas Douglas

Mayor of Tallahassee
- In office 1830 – 1830 (1st term); 1832 (2nd); 1840 (3rd)
- Preceded by: John Y. Garey (1st term); Charles Austin (2nd); R. B. Ker (3rd)
- Succeeded by: Charles Austin (1st term); Robert J. Hackley (2nd); Francis W. Eppes (3rd)

Personal details
- Born: October 8, 1806 Charleston, South Carolina, U.S.
- Died: January 23, 1874 (aged 67) Galveston, Texas, U.S.
- Party: Democratic
- Profession: Judge; Lawyer; Politician

Leslie Atchinson Thompson (October 8, 1806 – January 23, 1874) was a lawyer, author of works on legal subjects, politician, and judge. He was city clerk, treasurer, and mayor of Tallahassee. He also served as an associate justice of the Supreme Court of Florida from 1851 to 1853.

== Early life and education ==
Born in Charleston, South Carolina, "[t]he Thompson family moved to Savannah, Georgia, not long after Leslie was born". Thompson went to college in Savannah, and studied law in the office of a local judge to be admitted to the Georgia Bar in 1826. He moved to Tallahassee, Florida, the following year.

== Career and writing ==
Thompson opened a law practice in Tallahassee, which flourished. Thompson then "began to participate in the politics of the state capital", serving as city clerk, treasurer and mayor. In 1838, Thompson was selected to represent Leon County, Florida at the state's Constitutional Convention, held in St. Joseph, Florida from 1838 to 1839.

Thompson was "a prolific writer" who "authored several classic treatises on Florida law". Following Florida's ascension to statehood in 1845, the Florida Legislature appointed Thompson to compile a digest of the general and public laws of the state and territory, which sold 1,500 copies, and which placed Thompson "in the forefront of the legal profession", and "was a much-cited reference source for many years". Other writings by Thompson included "a compilation of the British statutes that were incorporated as part of Florida's laws", and the rules of practice for Florida's circuit courts.

== Judicial service ==
In January, 1851 the Florida legislature created a new three-member supreme court, with a chief justice and two associate justices to be elected by the legislature. Thompson was elected to a two-year term as an associate justice, along with Walker Anderson as chief justice Albert G. Semmes as the other associate justice. Anderson, Semmes, and Thompson "were important in establishing the Supreme Court of Florida as an independent judicial body".

In 1853, Thompson opted to run for a full term as chief justice, but was defeated in the popular election by Thomas Baltzell.

== Later life and death ==
Following his electoral defeat, Thompson moved to Galveston, Texas, where he was a city alderman of Galveston and a member of the Texas House of Representatives. He remained in the Legislature until November 2, 1857. Thompson died in 1874 in Galveston.

Texas House of Representatives
| Preceded by Lorenzo Sherwood | Member of the Texas House of Representatives from District 35 (Galveston); 1856–1857 | Succeeded by Thomas Miller Joseph |
Political offices
| Preceded by Newly established seat | Justice of the Florida Supreme Court; 1851–1853 | Succeeded by Thomas Douglas |
| Preceded by John Y. Garey; Charles Austin; R. B. Ker | Mayor of Tallahassee, Florida; 1830; 1832; 1840 | Succeeded by Charles Austin; Robert J. Hackley; Francis W. Eppes |
