= Joseph B. Lancaster =

American judge and politician

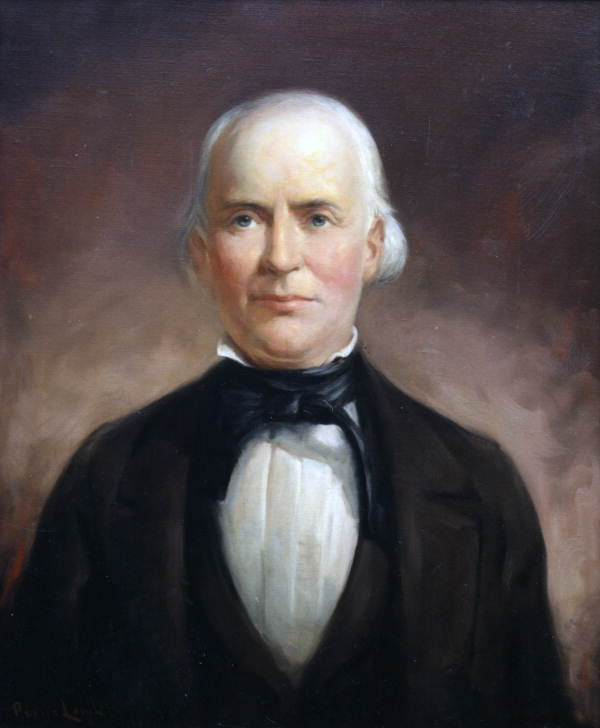
- Lancaster in 1847

4th Mayor of Jacksonville
- In office 1846–1847
- Preceded by: None
- Succeeded by: Oliver Wood

3rd Speaker of the Florida House of Representatives
- In office November 27, 1847 – December 23, 1847
- Preceded by: Robert Brown
- Succeeded by: John Chain

Justice of the Florida Supreme Court
- In office 1848–1850
- Preceded by: George W. MacRae
- Succeeded by: Walker Anderson

1st Mayor of Tampa
- In office February 14, 1856 – November 25, 1856
- Preceded by: None
- Succeeded by: Darwin A. Branch

Personal details
- Born: 1790 Kentucky
- Died: November 25, 1856 (aged 65–66) Tampa, Florida
- Party: Whig
- Spouse: Annie Blair
- Profession: Politician

Joseph Bradford Lancaster (1790 – November 25, 1856) was an American lawyer and Whig politician who served on the Florida Supreme Court from 1848 to 1850. An important figure in Florida law and politics, he was the last justice under the system in which the circuit court judges served also on the supreme court. He served as Mayor of Jacksonville, Florida from 1846 to 1847 and as the first Mayor of Tampa, Florida in 1856.

== Biography ==
Lancaster was born in Kentucky in 1790, the son of John and Catherine Miles Lancaster. He married Annie Blair, the daughter of a Presbyterian minister, in 1815. He read law, was admitted to the Kentucky bar, and opened a practice in Bardstown and Lebanon. He moved to Florida at the behest of former Bardstown resident Florida Governor William Pope DuVal. DuVal appointed him assistant secretary to the East Florida land commission. Lancaster opened a legal practice in St. Augustine.

He gained admission to the bar of the Florida Territorial Court of appeals and appointment to the Florida Territorial Legislative Council in 1825. He entered the lists politically when he defended Judge Joseph L. Smith against charges of abuse of power. The following year he was appointed justice of the peace of St. Johns County, Florida. He became judge of the Alachua County court in 1827 and conducted county's 1830 federal census. In 1831 the president appointed him the Port of St. Johns at Jacksonville's first collector. He was elected chief clerk of the territorial council in 1833 and for six successive years.

Governor DuVal appointed him Duval County lumber inspector in 1834. He served with distinction as a militia officer in the Second Seminole War and was badly wounded near Micanopy. Duval County voters elected him to the territorial house in 1839 and 1840 and yearly from 1842 to 1844. He presided over the house in 1843 and 1844. In 1845, he was nominated to run for Congress, but had to withdraw. The following year, the legislature appointed Benjamin D. Wright and George W. MacRae to the circuit court instead of Lancaster.

In 1846 Lancaster became Mayor of Jacksonville, serving one two-year term from 1846 to 1847. He was subsequently elected to the Florida House of Representatives, in an election tainted by accusations of election fraud. He was elected Speaker of the House, and the membership humorously revolved to rename the chamber the "House of Lancaster" and to wear red roses. The following year, he was appointed to the Southern Supreme Court. His impartiality and sound judgement refuted his critics fears. In 1850, the supreme court and the circuit court were separated, and he served on the circuit court until 1853, when he lost a three-way popular election. In 1852, the collapse of the Whig party prompted him to move to the American Party. Financial troubles led him to move to Tampa. He was elected Tampa's first Mayor on February 16, 1856.

He is buried at Oaklawn Cemetery in Tampa and has a memorial stone at Jacksonville's Old City Cemetery.

Political offices
| Preceded by None | Mayor of Tampa; 1856–1856 | Succeeded by Darwin Austen Branch |
| Preceded by unknown | Mayor of Jacksonville; 1846–1847 | Succeeded by Oliver Wood |
