= Hal P. Dekle =

American judge (1917–2005)

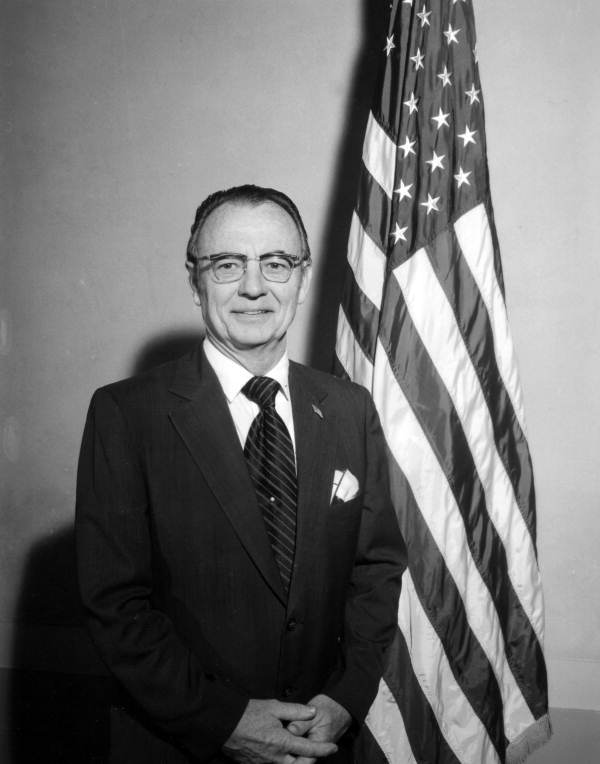
- Dekle in 1972

Justice of the Florida Supreme Court
- In office January 5, 1971 – April 30, 1975
- Preceded by: E. Harris Drew
- Succeeded by: Alan C. Sundberg

Personal details
- Born: November 21, 1917 Venice, Florida, U.S.
- Died: May 23, 2005 (aged 87) Brandon, Florida, U.S.

Hal Peb Dekle (November 21, 1917 – May 23, 2005) was a justice of the Supreme Court of Florida from January 5, 1971, to April 30, 1975.

Born in Venice, Florida, Dekle entered the practice of law in 1940, becoming successful in civil practice. He became a trial judge in Miami, and ran for a seat on the Florida Supreme Court in 1968, but lost in the primaries to Vassar B. Carlton. However, Dekle was then elected to in 1970, following the early retirement of Justice E. Harris Drew.

In 1975, Dekle was investigated along with fellow justice David McCain regarding "allegations they had intervened in cases to help friends", arising "when a clerk went public with details of a lawyer for a utility writing an opinion for the justices". Both justices resigned rather than face an impeachment investigation in the Florida House of Representatives.

Dekle died in Brandon, Florida.

Political offices
Preceded by E. Harris Drew	Justice of the Florida Supreme Court; 1971–1975	Succeeded by Alan C. Sundberg
