= Thomas M. Shackleford =

American judge (1859–1927)

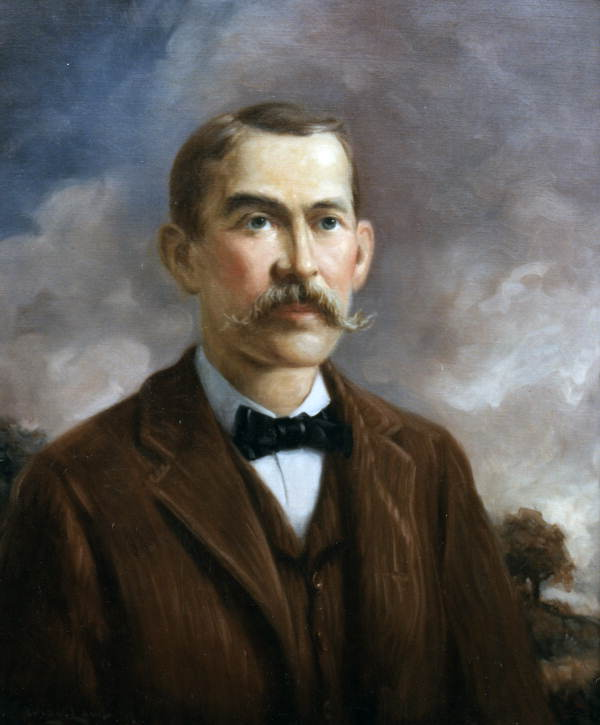
Painted portrait of Florida Supreme Court Justice Thomas M. Shackleford (circa 1902)

Thomas Mitchell Shackleford (November 14, 1859 – September 21, 1927) was a justice of the Florida Supreme Court from 1902 to 1917.

Shackleford was born in Fayetteville, Tennessee, on November 14, 1859. He studied at Burritt College in Spencer, Tennessee.

He was a lawyer in Tennessee for several months before moving to Lake Weir, Florida in 1882. Before his appointment to the Florida Supreme Court, he was a delegate to the Democratic National Convention in 1888, a presidential elector of Florida in 1892, and City Attorney of Tampa from 1900 to 1902. He had an influential role in forming the Florida Bar Association.

In December 1902, under the authority of a new amendment, Governor William Sherman Jennings appointed Evelyn C. Maxwell, Thomas M. Shackleford, and Robert S. Cockrell to seats on the six-man court. Shackleford served in office 14 years and 9 months. His terms were from December 1, 1902, to 1905, from 1909 until 1913, from January 1915 until September 1, 1917, and as chief justice from June 12, 1905, until January 4, 1909, and January 1913 until January 1915.

He died September 21, 1927, Tampa, Florida.

Political offices
Preceded by Newly created seat	Justice of the Florida Supreme Court; 1902–1917	Succeeded by Thomas F. West
