= George McCrae (disambiguation) =

George McCrae (born 1944) is an American soul and disco singer.

George McCrae may also refer to:

- Sir George McCrae (politician) (1860–1928), Scottish textile merchant and Liberal Party politician
- George Gordon McCrae (1833–1927), Australian poet

== See also ==
- George McRae (1858–1923), Scottish/Australian architect
- George W. MacRae, United States judge
