= Jefferson B. Browne =

American judge (1857–1937)

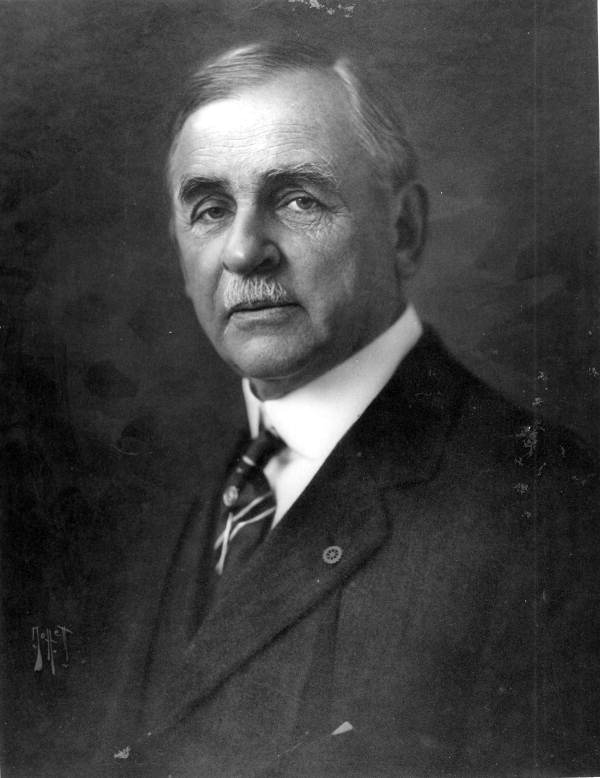
- Browne in 1917

Chief Justice of the Florida Supreme Court
- In office January 2, 1917 – January 1923

Justice of the Florida Supreme Court
- In office January 2, 1917 – May 20, 1925
- Preceded by: Robert S. Cockrell
- Succeeded by: Armstead Brown

Personal details
- Born: June 6, 1857 Key West, Florida, U.S.
- Died: May 4, 1937 (aged 79) Key West, Florida, U.S.

Jefferson Beale Browne (June 6, 1857 – May 4, 1937) was a public official and legislator who also served as a justice of the Florida Supreme Court from 1917 to 1925, including service as chief justice from 1917 to 1923.

Born in Key West, Monroe County, Florida, to businessman and politician Joseph Beverly Browne and Anne (Neives) Browne, Browne's "first job after graduating from high school was as assistant keeper on Fowey Rocks Lighthouse". As a lighthouse keeper, Browne was able to dedicate his long hours of isolation to studying the law. He then received a law degree from the University of Iowa. Browne thereafter had "a hopscotch career", including stints as a "county surveyor, postmaster, city attorney, president of the Florida Senate, U.S. Customs collector at the port of Key West, chief justice of the Florida Supreme Court, and chairman of the Florida Railroad Commission". In 1912, Browne wrote a history of Key West, Key West: The Old and the New.

Browne was "elected to the state Senate in 1890—and became president of the Senate at its first session in April, 1891". While serving in this office, he introduced an 1893 bill to grant Henry Flagler's Jacksonville, St. Augustine & Indian River Railway a charter to extend the railroad to the Florida Keys. In 1904, Browne was elected chairman of the Florida Railroad Commission.

Browne was elected to the Florida Supreme Court in 1916, served from January 2, 1917, to January 1923 as Chief Justice and from January 1923 to May 20, 1925, as an associate justice. As a Justice, Browne was particularly concerned with property rights, and avoiding government encroachment on such rights. He wrestled with the concept of prohibition of alcohol, a major political issue during his time on the court, writing of an inclination to support laws addressing the negative effects of alcohol consumption, but ultimately deciding that protecting personal property rights against government interference was an overriding concern.

Browne died in Key West.

Political offices
Preceded by Joseph B. Wall	President of the Florida Senate; 1891–1892	Succeeded by William H. Reynolds
Preceded by Robert S. Cockrell	Justice of the Florida Supreme Court; 1917–1925	Succeeded by Armstead Brown
