= Benjamin S. Liddon =

American judge (1853–1909)

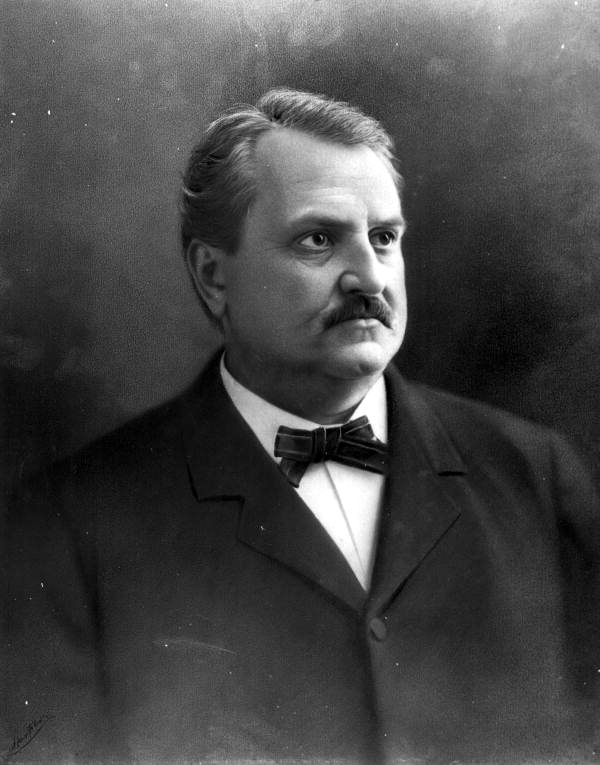
Benjamin S. Liddon

Benjamin S. Liddon (September 7, 1853 – December 21, 1909) was a justice of the Florida Supreme Court from 1894 to 1896.

Born in Marianna, Florida, Liddon taught school while studying to become a lawyer. He began practicing law in 1875 and formed a partnership with Francis B. Carter, who would eventually succeed him on the supreme court.

Although Justice Raney's term did not expire until the end of 1894, he resigned a few months early and Liddon was appointed to the seat as Chief Justice, and was then elected in the fall to a full six-year term as associate justice. He served 2 years and 7 months from June 1, 1894, to January 1897.

Liddon resigned in January 1897 and moved to Pensacola to resume a law practice. Governor William D. Bloxham appointed Francis Carter to succeed him on January 11, 1897. He died December 21, 1909, in New Orleans, Louisiana.

Political offices
Preceded by George P. Raney	Justice of the Florida Supreme Court; 1894 –1896	Succeeded by Francis B. Carter
