= Daniel G. McLean =

American lawyer and politician

Daniel G. McLean was an American lawyer and politician in Florida. He signed the first Florida Constitution in 1838 at St. Joseph, served in the Florida Senate including as President of the Florida Senate, served as Speaker of the Florida Territory's legislature, and was Grandmaster of the Masons. He was a Whig. He lived in Euchee Anna.

He was the son of Donald McLean and Nancy Gunn McLean. Nancy McLean Campbell was his sister. The Walton County Heritage Association has a photo of her.

McLean was involved with the Whigs in Walton County, Florida in 1845. Along with John L. McKinnon, he represented Walton County at the Florida Constitutional Convention of 1838.

In 1845 he was elected over Washington Tabor for a Florida Senate seat.

In 1846, he wrote to Perkins and Perkins in New York about red cedar prices from Eucheeanna, Florida.

He served as a Grand Scribe and Worshipful Master in the masons.
