= Eucheeanna, Florida =

Eucheeanna Euchee Anna
- Unincorporated community
- Location in Florida Location in the United States
- Coordinates: 30°38′45″N 86°02′42″W
- Country: United States
- State: Florida
- County: Walton

Eucheeanna, also known as Euchee Anna, is an unincorporated community in Walton County, in the U.S. state of Florida. It was the county seat from 1845, when Florida became a state, until 1885 when its courthouse burned and the county was moved several miles away to DeFuniak Springs.

== History ==
=== 1820s ===
The community was named after the Yuchi (or Euchee) Indians and settled by Scotch Presbyterians in 1823. The area was known as Euchee Anna Valley Lands.

Daniel G. McLean lived in the area and corresponded with a firm in New York about red cedar prices. He was a resident of the area in 1847 when he served as President of the Florida Senate. He was part of the community's mason lodge.

=== 1840s ===
Starting in 1845, Eucheeanna became the county seat of Walton County, which was previously located in Alaquah.

=== 1860s ===
Union troops, led by General Alexander Asboth marched through and razed Eucheeanna on their way towards Marianna and Tallahassee.

=== 1880s ===
An act of arson burned the courthouse located in Eucheeanna. After it was burned in 1885, the county seat was moved to De Funiak Springs.

=== Modern Today ===
Locations of note still remaining in Eucheeanna are the Euchee Valley Presbyterian Church and the Euchee Valley Cemetery.
