= Charles B. Parkhill =

American judge (1859–1933)

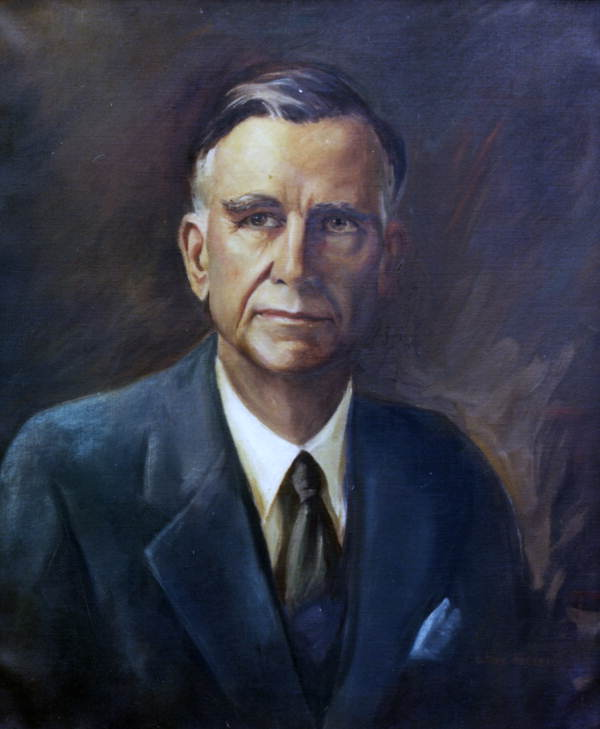
Charles B. Parkhill c. 1905

Charles Breckinridge Parkhill (June 23, 1859 – May 13, 1933) was a Florida State Senator and a justice of the Florida Supreme Court from May 25, 1905 to January 1912.

== Life and education ==
He was the son of Captain George W. and Elizabeth Bellamy Parkhill and was born in the family farm in Leon County, Florida on June 23, 1859. Parkhill obtained his degree at the University of Virginia, and was admitted to the Florida bar in 1882 after moving to Pensacola.

He was a member and president of the Hillsborough County Bar Association, a Florida State Bar Association member, and also a member of the American Legion, The Elks, Beta Theta Phi and a grand master of the Knights of Pythias.

For several years he was a member of the Escambia Rifles, then Captain of the First Regiment of the Florida State Troops and finally Major of the Third Battalion of the Florida State Troops.

== Career ==
Parkhill was a State Senator for Escambia County, Florida from 1888 till 1890. He then became a county solicitor, before becoming a Judge of First Judicial Circuit from 1904 till 1905. A Democrat, he took an active part serving on councils and making speeches.

He was appointed to the supreme court when Francis B. Carter resigned in 1905, he then stood and was elected for the next six year term in 1906. He was known for his "careful application, fairness and conscientious discharge of his duty". At the end of Justice Parkhill's term, the supreme court was reduced from six to five justices. Therefore when Justice Parkhill resigned at the end of his term there was no replacement.

He retired from the court intending to run for the third congressional district of Florida in place of his cousin Dannite H. Mays the current serving congressman. He had also been encouraged to run in the previous congressional elections but declined to run citing that he was not willing to seek another position at the start of his current office.

After his unsuccessful attempt for congress he started back up in law practice and then continued his legal career as the city attorney. When World War I started he served in Washington and abroad as a Major in the department of the judge advocate. In 1920 he returned to Tampa and was elected state attorney for the 13th Judicial Circuit and served until his death in 1933.

== Personal life and death ==
He married Genevieve Perry in 1885 the daughter of Governor Edward A. Perry. They had one daughter together before she died just one year later in 1886. Later in 1891 he then married Helen Wall the daughter of Judge J. B. Wall. In total he had five daughters and three sons, one dying a year before he did.

Parkhill died in Houston, Texas on May 13, 1933 at the house of one of his daughters, and was taken back to his Tampa home 2 days later before being buried at Woodlawn Cemetery.

Political offices
Preceded by Francis B. Carter	Justice of the Florida Supreme Court; 1905–1912	Succeeded by Seat abolished
