= Bird M. Pearson =

American judge

Byrd M. Pearson
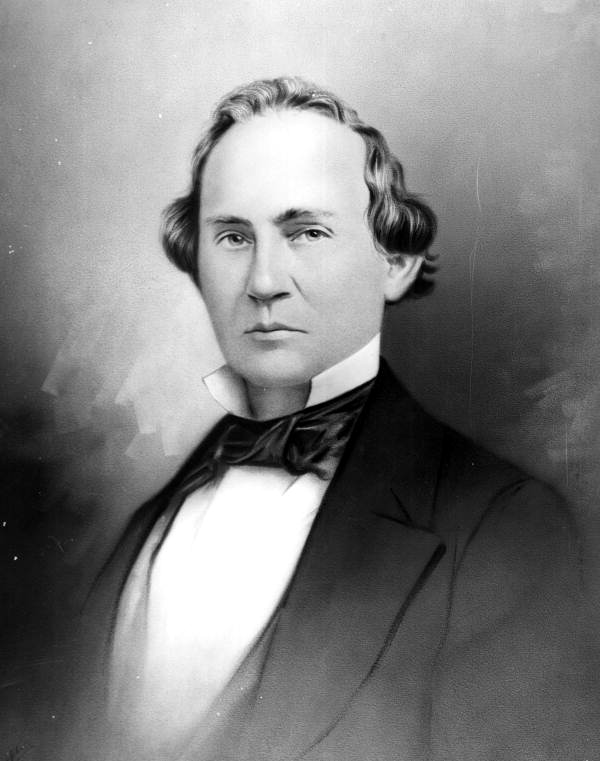

Justice of the Florida Supreme Court
- In office 1856–1859
- Preceded by: Thomas Douglas

Personal details
- Born: 1803 Union County, South Carolina, U.S.
- Died: October 9, 1859 (aged 55–56) Jacksonville, Florida, U.S.

Byrd Murphy Pearson (1803 – October 9, 1859) was a Florida lawyer, planter and a Democratic politician who served on the Florida Supreme Court from 1856 to 1859, one of the first to be popularly elected. He replaced Thomas Baltzell as Chief Justice.

Pearson was born in Union District, South Carolina, in 1803. He graduated from South Carolina College and read law. Little is known of his law practice, though he served as a state solicitor in South Carolina. He lived for a time in Faunsdale, Alabama, where he built a plantation. He moved to a Hernando County plantation near Brooksville, Florida in 1845. He named the plantation he built "The Lake Lindsey Plantation" as the lake provided its northern border. The land is now Chinsegut Hill Manor House is on the National Register of Historic Places.

An enslaver of up to 30 people, Byrd was an ardent proponent of states' rights, slavery, and secession. He was a delegate to the 1850 Nashville Convention. In 1851, he moved to Jacksonville. It was felt that a bid to run for the Florida Supreme Court would be premature in 1853, as the State's sentiments were too pro Union. In 1855, he ran to fill the vacancy left by the death of Thomas Douglas. Ill health forced him to not seek reelection. He died in Jacksonville on October 9, 1859.
