= Charles H. DuPont =

American judge

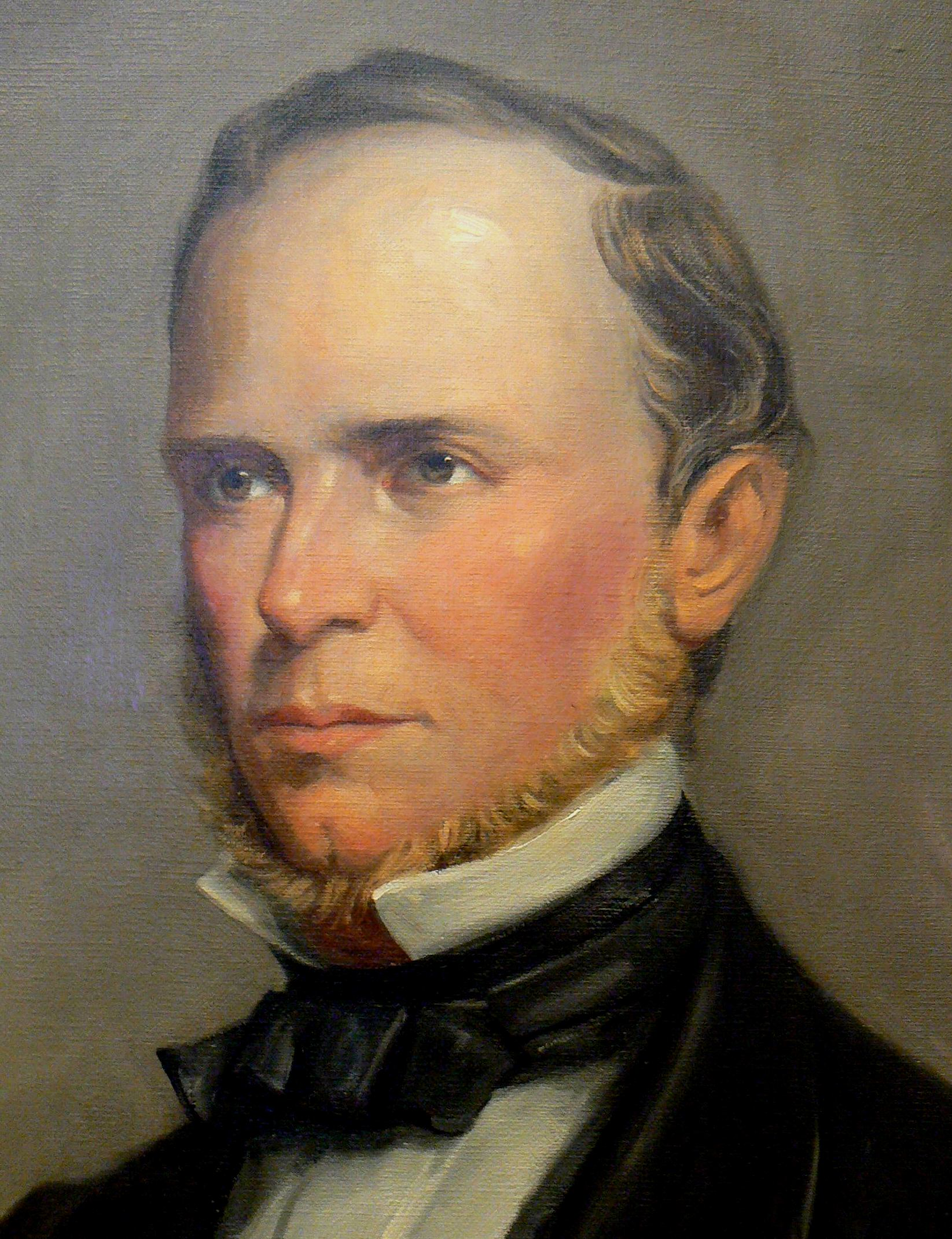
Charles H. DuPont

Charles Henry DuPont (January 27, 1805 – October 14, 1877) was a Florida lawyer, planter, businessman, and Democratic politician who served as a Florida Supreme Court justice from 1854 to 1868. He was Chief Justice from 1860 to 1868.

DuPont was born in Beaufort District, South Carolina. His family were cousins of the Du Pont family. His father died when he was young, and his mother sent him to Ohio where he worked on a farm and attended the common schools. He graduated from Franklin College in Georgia in 1826. The same year, he moved to Gadsden County, Florida where he opened a legal practice and became a planter. At one time he held over 5,000 acres (20 km^{2}) in Gadsden County and owned more than 100 slaves.

In 1833 Governor William Pope DuVal appointed him appraiser for the Union Bank. He became a trustee of the Central Bank in 1834. That same year, Governor DuVal appointed him judge for the Gadsden County Court. Duval also appointed him to the legislative council in 1834 and 1835, where he was involved running the militia, making internal improvements to infrastructure, and setting up the judiciary. He was elected by Florida's Middle District in 1838 to the territorial senate, where he advocated for Florida statehood. He left the Senate in 1841, but continued to serve in the Florida Militia.

He was chosen to serve as a member of the Electoral College in 1848. He was a delegate to the Nashville Convention of 1850 and became an advocate for Secession. In 1853, his campaign for election as a Florida Supreme Court Justice was successful, as was his bid to succeed Thomas Baltzell as chief justice in 1860. His salary was $2,500 (~$89,583 in 2025) in 1861.

After the end of the Civil War, he was reappointed by Governor Walker. As chief justice, he was instrumental in developing and promoting Florida's black codes, laws that for all intents and purposes returned Florida Blacks to slavery. Before Reconstruction brought an end to the black codes and DuPont's career on the Bench in 1868, he was instrumental in forming the Agricultural and Immigration Association of Florida. This association sought to create a source of cheap labor by promoting immigration from other countries to Florida. He continued to innovate and advocate for Florida agriculture until his death.

He became despondent after the death of his beloved wife, Mary Ann DeGraffenreid Hobson on July 10, 1877, and his health began to decline. Nevertheless, he traveled to the Midwest to recruit immigrant labor to Florida, and became seriously ill in Minneapolis. He died at the home of his daughter in Quincy, Florida on October 14, 1877, a day after returning home.
