= Adam Tanenbaum =

American judge (born 1972)

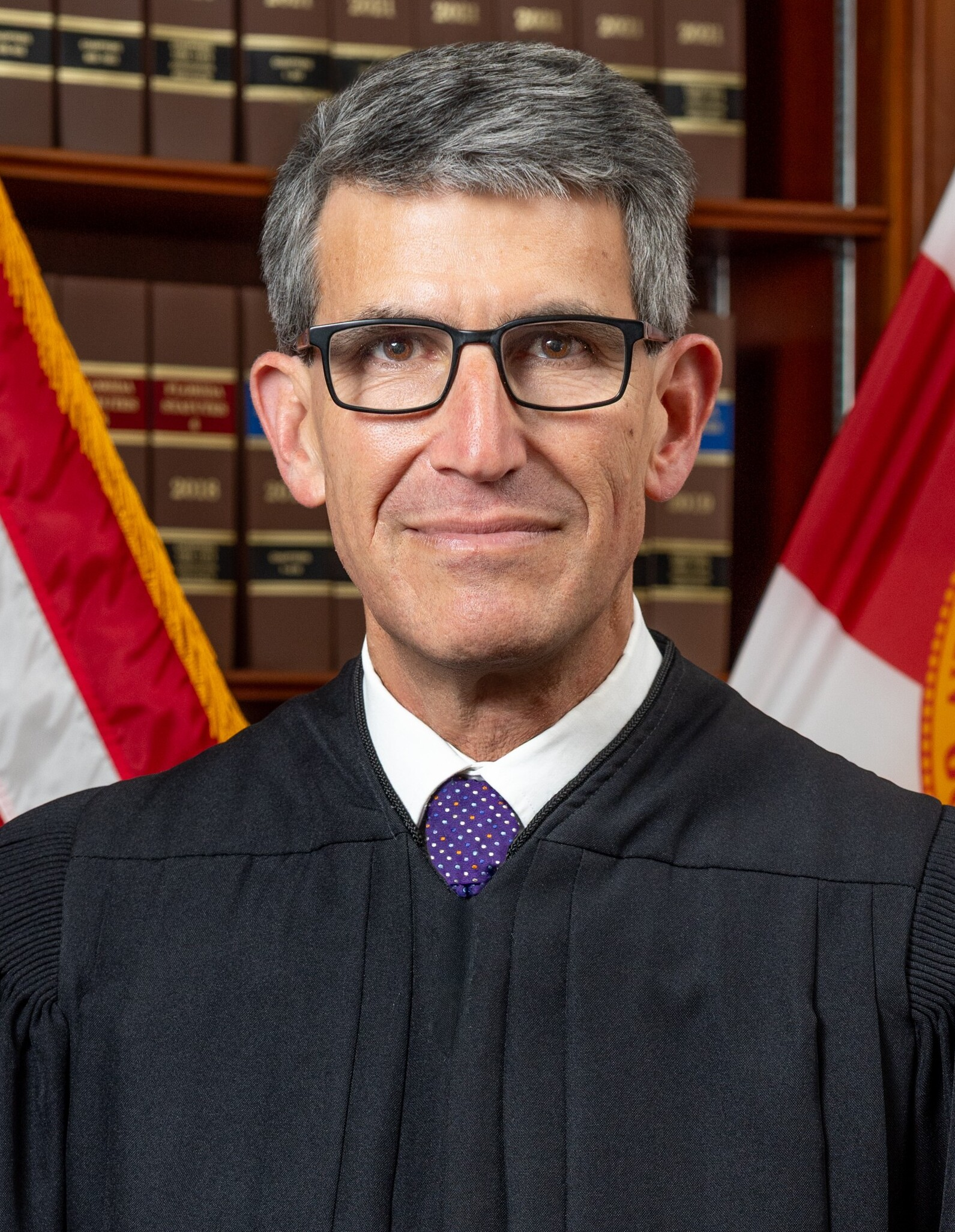

Justice of the Florida Supreme Court
- Incumbent
- Assumed office January 15, 2026
- Appointed by: Ron DeSantis
- Preceded by: Charles Canady

Judge of the Florida First District Court of Appeal
- In office November 1, 2019 - January 15, 2026
- Appointed by: Ron DeSantis
- Succeeded by: Lance Neff

Personal details
- Born: February 6, 1972 (age 54)
- Education: University of Florida (BA); Georgetown University JD)

Adam Tanenbaum (born February 6, 1972) is an American lawyer and judge in Florida. Florida governor Ron DeSantis appointed him to a seat on the Florida Supreme Court in 2026.

Tanenbaum grew up in Pinellas County, Florida. He was student body president and valedictorian of Seminole High School in Seminole, Florida graduating in 1989. He is a graduate of the University of Florida and Georgetown University Law Center (1996).

Tanenbaum moved with his family to Tallahassee, Florida in 2014. Tanenbaum served as Florida's chief deputy solicitor general between 2014 and 2015, serving under Florida Solicitor General Allen Winsor and Florida Attorney General Pam Bondi. In this position, he defended the State of Florida's constitutional definition of marriage as being between a man and a woman. Then, Tanenbaum served as general counsel for the Florida House of Representatives between 2016 and 2019.

DeSantis appointed Tanenbaum to the First District Court of Appeal on October 16, 2019, and Tanenbaum was sworn in on November 1, 2019.

He succeeds Charles Canady on the Florida Supreme Court.

== See also ==
- List of justices of the Supreme Court of Florida

Legal offices
Preceded by Charles Canady	Justice of the Florida Supreme Court; 2026–present	Incumbent
