= Armstead Brown =

American judge (1875–1951)

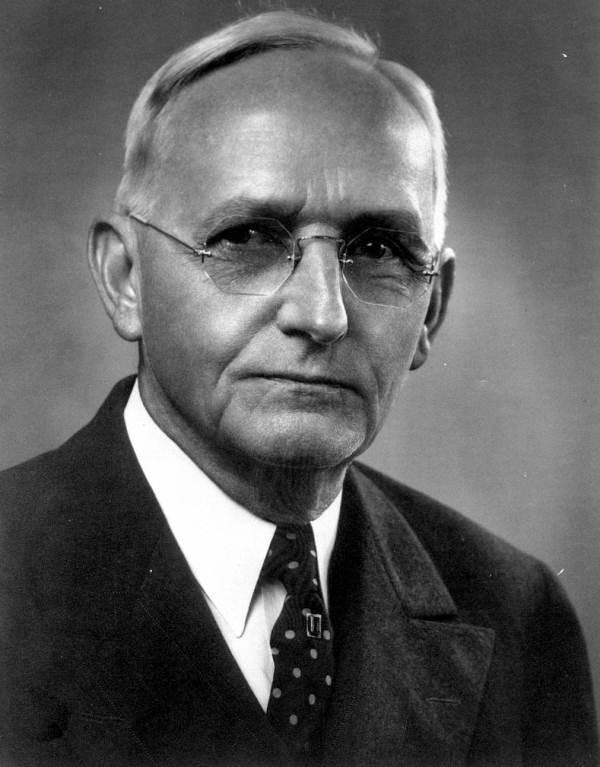
- Brown in 1925

17th Chief Justice of Florida
- In office January 1941 – January 1943
- Preceded by: William Glenn Terrell
- Succeeded by: Rivers H. Buford
- In office December 4, 1925 – January 1927
- Preceded by: Thomas F. West
- Succeeded by: W. H. Ellis

Justice of the Supreme Court of Florida
- In office July 1, 1925 – December 1, 1946
- Preceded by: Jefferson B. Browne
- Succeeded by: Paul D. Barns

Personal details
- Born: June 6, 1875 Talbotton, Georgia, U.S.
- Died: October 29, 1951 (aged 76) New York, New York, U.S.

Armstead Brown (June 6, 1875 – October 29, 1951) was a justice of the Florida Supreme Court from 1925 to 1946.

Born in Talbotton, Georgia, in 1875, Brown dropped out of school at the age of 14 to become the personal secretary to former Confederate general John Brown Gordon. Brown studied law in Alabama under the tuition of his uncle, Judge J. R. Dowdell, who later joined the Alabama Supreme Court. He was admitted to the bar in Alabama in 1897, and practiced law in Montgomery, Alabama before being appointed a judge. In 1915, Brown moved to Jacksonville, Florida, before moving to Miami two years later.

Governor John W. Martin appointed Brown to the Florida Supreme Court in 1925, and he was called to the bench on July 1. He largely followed a middle-of-the road between liberal and conservative judicial philosophy, although his opinions largely used detailed outlines of reasoning and conservative language. Brown handled cases involving zoning laws and technical interpretations of the state constitution. Brown served two terms as Chief Justice, from December 4, 1925, to January 11, 1927, and from January 1941 to January 1943. He retired on December 1, 1946, a month ahead of his scheduled retirement.

Brown died at the Plaza Hotel in New York, New York on October 29, 1951. He was celebrating his anniversary with his wife, and the death was attributed to a heart condition. Five of his diaries from the 1940s were donated to the Florida Supreme Court Library and present a view of his life on the court.

Political offices
Preceded by Jefferson B. Browne	Justice of the Florida Supreme Court; 1925–1946	Succeeded by Paul D. Barns
