= Paul D. Barns =

American judge (1894–1973)

Justice of the Supreme Court of Florida
- In office December 2, 1946 – September 1, 1949
- Preceded by: Armstead Brown
- Succeeded by: B. K. Roberts

Personal details
- Born: Paul Dryden Barns; March 20, 1894 Plant City, Florida, U.S.
- Died: September 22, 1973 (aged 79) Miami, Florida, U.S.
- Education: University of Florida
- Occupation: Judge

Military service
- Allegiance: United States
- Branch/service: United States Army (United States Army Air Corps)
- Battles/wars: World War I

Paul Dryden Barns (March 20, 1894 – September 22, 1973) was an American judge who served as a justice of the Florida Supreme Court from December 2, 1946, to September 1, 1949.

== Early life and education ==
Born in Plant City, Florida, Barns was an aerial gunner and then an aerial gunnery instructor in the United States Army Air Corps during World War I. He graduated from the University of Florida College of Law in 1920.

== Judicial career ==
Barns became a judge of the Dade Civil Court of Record in 1929, and then a circuit judge until his election to the Florida Supreme Court in 1946, to a seat vacated by the retirement of Justice Armstead Brown.

Barns "thoroughly disliked Tallahassee", but expressed a sense of civic obligation to continue in the position until his resignation in 1949.

== Later life ==
Barns then returned to private practice in Miami, also occasionally teaching at the University of Miami School of Law, and serving as a substitute judge by special appointment.

Barns died in Miami, Florida, from pulmonary fibrosis attributed to his military service.

Political offices
Preceded by Armstead Brown	Justice of the Florida Supreme Court; 1946–1949	Succeeded by B. K. Roberts
