= Ben Overton =

American judge

Ben F. Overton
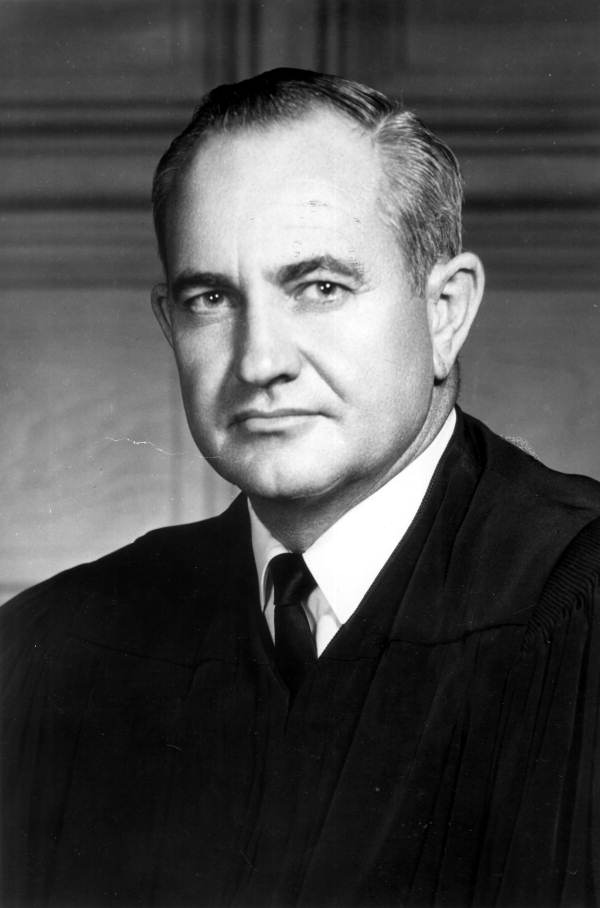

Chief Justice for the Florida Supreme Court
- In office 1976–1978

Justice of the Florida Supreme Court
- In office 1974–1999
- Preceded by: Vassar B. Carlton
- Succeeded by: Peggy Quince

Personal details
- Born: December 15, 1926 Green Bay, Wisconsin, U.S.
- Died: December 29, 2012 (aged 86) Gainesville, Florida, U.S.

Benjamin Frederick Overton (December 15, 1926 – December 29, 2012) was a justice of the Supreme Court of Florida.

Ben Overton was born December 15, 1926, in Green Bay, Wisconsin. He was a judge from the U.S. state of Florida.

Overton graduated from the University of Florida with his bachelor's degree in 1951, and from the University of Florida College of Law with his law degree in 1952. He received his master of laws degree from the University of Virginia. He was a city attorney for St. Petersburg, Florida from 1954 to 1957, and he became a circuit judge in 1964. Overton served as a Florida Supreme Court Justice from 1974 to 1999. From 1976 to 1978, he served as the Chief Justice of the Court.

Overton, 86, died December 29, 2012, in Gainesville, Florida of complications from heart surgery.

== See also ==
- List of Pi Kappa Phi alumni
- List of Levin College of Law graduates
- List of University of Florida alumni
- List of University of Virginia alumni
