= Francis B. Carter =

American judge (1861–1905)

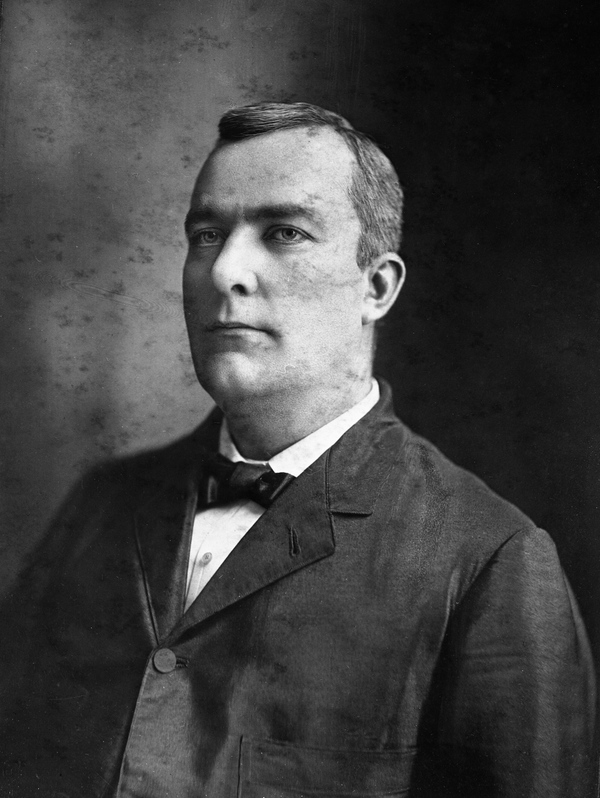
Francis B. Carter c. 1901

Francis Beauregard Carter (August 12, 1861 – January 9, 1937) was a justice of the Florida Supreme Court from January 11, 1897 to May 25, 1905.

== Early life, education, and career ==
Born in Jackson County, Florida, Carter became a prominent attorney in Marianna, Florida. In 1875, Carter formed a legal partnership with Benjamin S. Liddon, which lasted until Liddon's appointment to the Florida Supreme Court in 1894.

== Political and judicial activities ==
Carter was politically active, and was "a strong free silver man", to the point of becoming a "silver delegate" to the 1896 Democratic National Convention in Chicago. Carter was personal friends with William Jennings Bryan, and was "an earnest supporter of Bryan and Sewall throughout the convention". In August 1896, Carter was selected as a Democratic presidential elector for the state of Florida.

On January 11, 1897 Governor William D. Bloxham appointed Carter, then 35 years old, to a seat on the Florida Supreme Court vacated by the retirement of Justice Liddon. Carter served until 1905, when he "resigned to take a more active position as judge of the First Judicial Circuit".

== Death ==
Carter died in Pensacola, Florida, following an illness, at the age of 75.

Political offices
Preceded by Benjamin S. Liddon	Justice of the Florida Supreme Court; 1897–1905	Succeeded by Charles B. Parkhill
