= B. K. Roberts =

American judge (1907–1999)

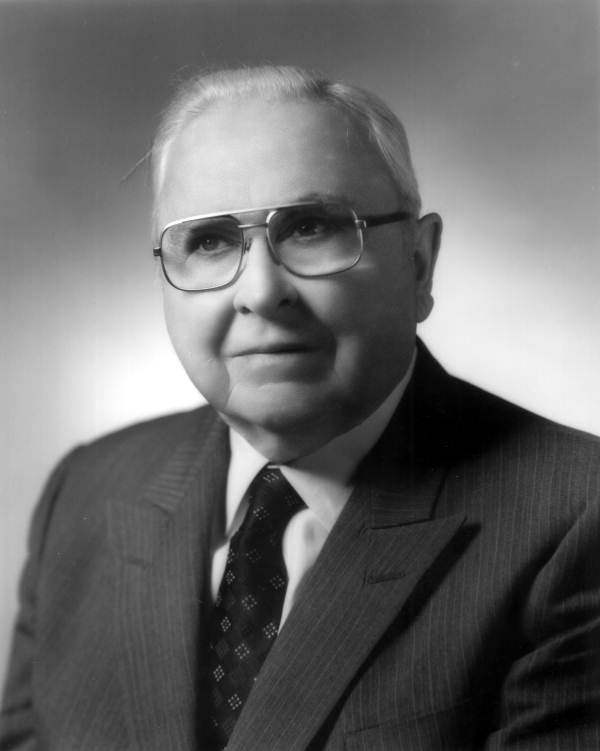
- Roberts in 1975

Chief Justice of the Florida Supreme Court
- In office January 5, 1971 – January 1, 1973
- Preceded by: Richard Ervin
- Succeeded by: Vassar B. Carlton
- In office July 1, 1961 – July 1, 1963
- Preceded by: Elwyn Thomas
- Succeeded by: E. Harris Drew
- In office March 14, 1953 – January 11, 1955
- Preceded by: T. Frank Hobson
- Succeeded by: John Mathews

Justice of the Florida Supreme Court
- In office September 1, 1949 – December 1, 1976
- Appointed by: Fuller Warren
- Preceded by: Paul D. Barns
- Succeeded by: Frederick B. Karl

Personal details
- Born: February 5, 1907 Sopchoppy, Florida, U.S.
- Died: August 4, 1999 (aged 92)

Bonnie Kaslow Roberts (February 5, 1907 – August 4, 1999) was a justice of the Florida Supreme Court from 1949 to 1976.

== Early life, education, and career ==
Roberts was born in Sopchoppy, Florida, in 1907. He grew up in poverty and attended Wakulla County schools, becoming a licensed schoolteacher at age 13. Roberts attended the University of Florida and worked on bridges to pay for his schooling. He lived in an attic without heat, and in 1923 a student committee declared that he was "not college material, and his poor clothing was embarrassing to the class." Nonetheless, Roberts befriended Fuller Warren and also made the acquaintance of prominent businessman Edward Ball. After graduating in 1928, Roberts established his legal practice in Tallahassee, Florida. He was involved in land speculation and prospered through his business investments. In World War II, Roberts was inducted into the military, serving as shipping commissioner for the Port of Jacksonville. After the war, he returned to his law practice in Tallahassee. He also owned a radio station and car dealership. In 1948, Roberts campaigned for Fuller Warren in his successful gubernatorial bid.

== Judicial service ==
After Justice Paul D. Barns resigned from the Florida Supreme Court in 1949, Governor Warren appointed Roberts to the position, and he came to the bench on September 1. He was an ardent segregationist, denying Virgil D. Hawkins's admission to the University of Florida Law School in 1949, 1955 and 1957. However, he was concerned with Hawkins's safety due to the rise of the Ku Klux Klan in Florida. On March 14, 1953, Roberts began his first term as Chief Justice, serving until January 11, 1955. He served his second term as chief justice from July 1, 1961, to July 1, 1963. Roberts was responsible for the plan that established the state public defenders office, leading to the passing of the Public Defenders Act of 1963. He was also the first Chief Justice to give a "State of the Courts" address to a joint session of the state legislature.

In 1965, Roberts helped establish the law school at Florida State University, and the main hall was named in his honor. He helped start the District Court of Appeal system and served on state constitutional revision commissions in 1968 and 1972. Richard Nixon considered him for the U.S. Supreme Court in 1969. Roberts served his third term as chief justice from January 5, 1971, to January 1, 1973. He sponsored the judicial reform amendment of 1972, creating the two-tier trial court system, and the merit-retention amendment of 1976, providing for appointed rather than elected judges on the Supreme Court and district courts of appeal. He was controversial when his personal friendships conflicted with his conduct on the bench, and he resigned on December 1, 1976, amid public scrutiny of several judges.

After resigning from the court, Roberts returned to Tallahassee to practice law. He said he did not want to "sit around and watch my arteries harden," and began overseeing three young partners and two associates. The law firm of Roberts, Baggett, LaFace & Richard expanded to 16 lawyers in 1992 and merged with Greenberg Traurig.

== Personal life and death ==
Roberts died on August 4, 1999, after a period of declining health. He was survived by his wife, Mary; a son, Thomas; a daughter, Mary Jane Miller; two grandchildren; and a great-grandchild. The memorial serviced was held at First Baptist Church of Tallahassee. In April 2019, the state senate passed a bill authorizing Florida State University to rename B. K. Roberts Hall due to his racist views. The only senator to oppose the bill was Dennis Baxley.

In subsequent years the bill never made it back to the Senate floor and a companion bill never got out of committee in the House nor did a companion bill ever got out of a House committee in 2019. At his First Baptist Church memorial service former Florida governor Reubin Askew, Democrat 1971 -1979, gave the eulogy and praised B. K. Roberts and his life of civic accomplishment, Florida Bar News Front Page September 1, 1999. Similarly though while governor, Askew was the keynote speaker at the November 19, 1974 naming ceremony for Florida State University College of Law's B.K. Roberts Hall, FSU Flambeau Newspaper, November 19–20, 1974.

Political offices
Preceded by Paul D. Barns	Justice of the Florida Supreme Court; 1949–1976	Succeeded by Frederick B. Karl
