= Roy H. Chapman =

American judge (1883–1952)

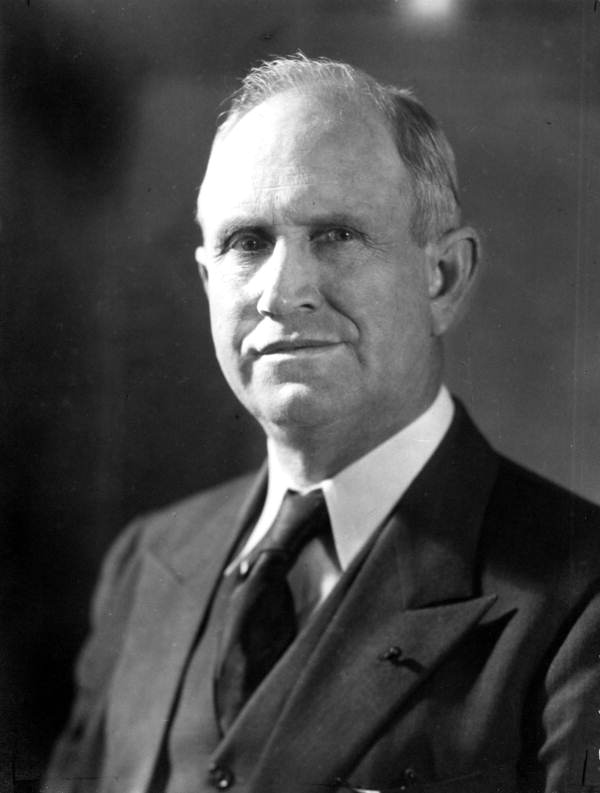
- Chapman in 1937

Justice of the Florida Supreme Court
- In office June 23, 1937 – August 9, 1952
- Appointed by: Fred P. Cone
- Preceded by: Fred Henry Davis
- Succeeded by: E. Harris Drew

Personal details
- Born: July 15, 1883 Blairsville, Georgia, U.S.
- Died: August 9, 1952 (aged 69) Tallahassee, Florida, U.S.

Roy Harrison Chapman (July 15, 1883 – August 9, 1952) was a justice of the Florida Supreme Court from 1937 to 1952.

Chapman was born on July 15, 1883, in Blairsville, Georgia. His family had fled to Florida to get out of the path of Sherman's March to the Sea. He was raised in Lake Butler, Florida, and attended the East Seminary at Gainesville. Chapman attended the University of Florida and settled on law as a career. He transferred to Stetson University Law School and graduated in 1908, passing the bar the same year. Champman moved to Lake City, Florida, and became the law partner of Fred P. Cone, both of whom were active in Democratic Party politics. Chapman was appointed to the board of law examiners in 1925, working to improve standards of professionalism in bar admissions. After Florida Supreme Court Justice Fred Henry Davis died in 1937, Cone, now the governor, appointed Chapman to the bench. This appointment was controversial and criticized by many. He became a Supreme Court Justice on June 23, 1937.

Chapman was known for being an advocate for the common people. An anecdote related that an attorney on behalf of a railroad was giving his argument in a negligence case. Chapman asked the attorney, "It hit the little woman didn't it?" The attorney said that it did, to which Chapman replied that he heard enough and ruled against the railroad. Chapman was appointed chief justice on January 9, 1945, serving until January 1947. As chief justice, Chapman emphasized his opinions and the administration of the judicial branch, which reduced allegations of cronyism. He also oversaw the beginning of construction of the current Supreme Court building as chief justice.

On March 24, 1950, Chapman upheld a ruling by the Dade County Eleventh Judicial Circuit Court in favor of the City of Miami, which allowed blacks to only golf on Mondays. He claimed that this did not violate the Equal Protection Clause since black patrons used the same facilities as whites, and noted that the city might provide additional days if there were an increase in black golfers. The one-day-a-week rule was based on the proportion of blacks to whites and Chapman cited precedents of legal segregation in education, parks, and liquor. Chapman wrote, "courts are powerless to eradicate social instincts or to abolish distinctions based on physical difference, and the attempt to do so only accentuates existing difficulties."

Chapman died on August 9, 1952, in Tallahassee, Florida. He had suffered from a heart ailment for several months which kept him off the bench. Governor Fuller Warren appointed E. Harris Drew to the court in his place. In 1957, a park in Tallahassee was named in his honor.

Political offices
Preceded by Fred Henry Davis	Justice of the Florida Supreme Court; 1937–1952	Succeeded by E. Harris Drew
