= E. Harris Drew =

American judge (1903–1978)

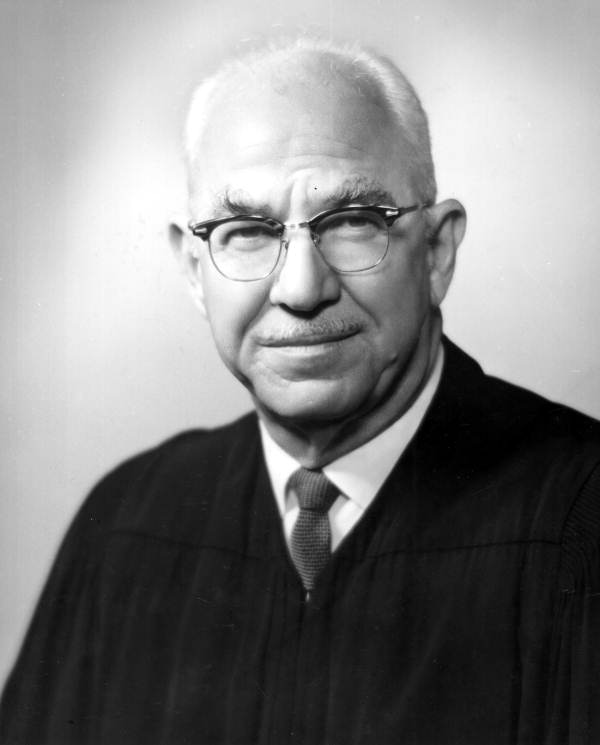
- Drew in 1964

30th Chief Justice of Florida
- In office July 1, 1963 – July 1, 1965
- Preceded by: B. K. Roberts
- Succeeded by: B. Campbell Thornal
- In office May 6, 1955 – January 8, 1957
- Preceded by: John Mathews
- Succeeded by: William Glenn Terrell

Justice of the Florida Supreme Court
- In office August 18, 1952 – January 5, 1971
- Appointed by: Fuller Warren
- Preceded by: Roy H. Chapman
- Succeeded by: Hal P. Dekle

Personal details
- Born: October 28, 1903 Fargo, Georgia, U.S.
- Died: February 9, 1978 (aged 74) Tallahassee, Florida, U.S.

Edwin Harris Drew (October 28, 1903 – February 9, 1978) was a justice of the Supreme Court of Florida from August 18, 1952, to January 5, 1971, including two periods as chief justice.

Born in Fargo, Georgia, Drew was educated in the public schools of Florida, and received an LL.B. from Stetson University in 1923. That year, Drew entered the practice of law in Palm Beach County, including beginning lengthy service as an attorney for the Town of Palm Beach. On June 10, 1927, Drew married Edith Turner of Cleaton, Kentucky, with whom he had one daughter, Melanie.

While maintaining his private practice, Drew was active in governmental affairs, serving as a member of the State Game and Fresh Water Fish Commission, member and secretary of the Board of Pilot Commissioners for the Port of Palm Beach, and a member of the committee whose work resulted in the continuous statutory revision system which became effective in 1941. Drew also served as president of the Stetson University Alumni Association. In addition to continually serving as an attorney for the Town of Palm Beach, he was also an attorney for Jupiter Inlet District and Everglades Drainage District. He also served as president of the Florida Bar Association, and on the committee that drafted the constitution and by-laws for its successor, The Florida Bar. Following this succession, he chaired the newly formed Committee on Judicial Administration of The Florida Bar.

When Florida Supreme Court Justice Roy H. Chapman died suddenly in 1952, a state bar poll named Drew as one of the most qualified attorneys for consideration for the seat, and Governor Fuller Warren subsequently appointed Drew to the court. Drew was elected to the seat in his own right six months later. and continued to be reelected thereafter. Drew served as chief justice from May 6, 1955, to January 8, 1957, and again from July 1, 1963, to July 1, 1965.

In 1957, Drew was the sole Justice dissenting from a decision of the Florida Supreme Court to deny Virgil D. Hawkins admission to the University of Florida Law School on the basis that Hawkins was black.

Drew died in Tallahassee, Florida.

Political offices
| Preceded by Roy H. Chapman | Justice of the Florida Supreme Court; 1952–1971 | Succeeded by Hal P. Dekle |
