= Benjamin D. Wright =

American judge

Benjamin Drake Wright
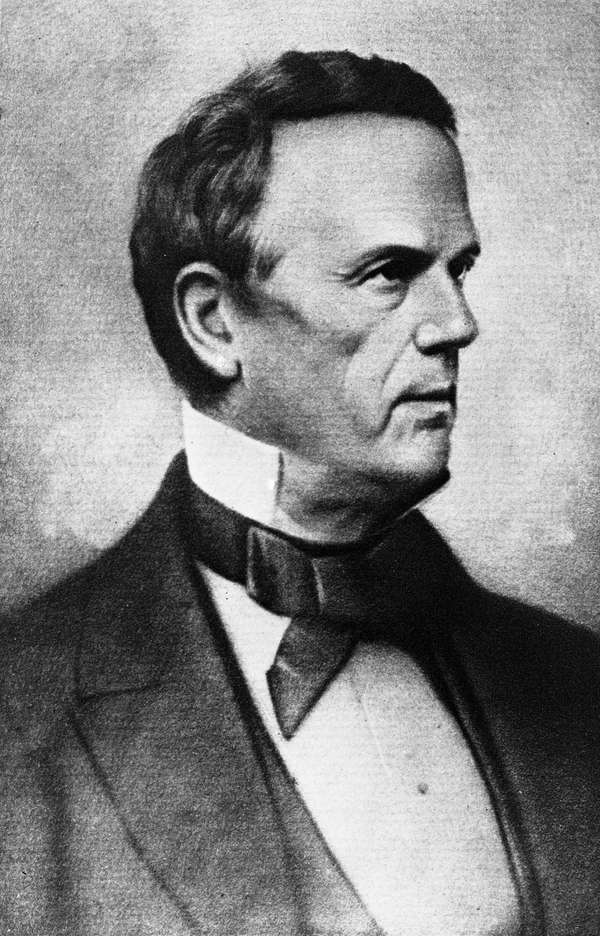
- Benjamin Drake Wright

Justice of the Florida Supreme Court
- In office 1853–1854
- Preceded by: Walker Anderson
- Succeeded by: Thomas Baltzell

Personal details
- Born: January 23, 1799 Wilkes-Barre, Pennsylvania, U.S.
- Died: April 28, 1874 (aged 75)
- Party: Whig
- Spouse: Josephine De La Rua (m. 1826)
- Profession: Lawyer, Journalist

Benjamin Drake Wright (January 23, 1799 – April 28, 1874) was a Florida lawyer, journalist, and Whig politician who served in Territorial Legislature, the State Senate, and as a Florida Supreme Court justice in 1853, succeeding Walker Anderson. He was born in Wilkes-Barre, Pennsylvania on January 23, 1799, the son of William and Sarah Ann Wright. He married Josephine De La Rua on February 23, 1826. He owned the Pensacola Gazette from 1834 to 1839 and edited the paper till 1846. He opposed secession and refused to swear allegiance to the Confederacy. He died on April 28, 1874.

Wright was admitted to the Luzerne County, Pennsylvania bar on April 7, 1820. When he was twenty-four, he moved to the Pensacola area. He became friends with and went to work for Richard K. Call, a protégé of Andrew Jackson. In April 1824 he was appointed to the Florida Territorial Council. In May, the president appointed him United States Attorney for Middle Florida in May 1824, encompassing the capital city of Tallahassee, and then for West Florida in February 1826.

His political career encountered difficulties after he accused Judge Henry Marie Brackenridge of malfeasance in November 1827. The judge retaliated by seeking Wright's replacement through a letter writing campaign and his political connections. As a result, another man was appointed in his place when his term expired in 1830. He was Pensacola's mayor during 1828 - 1829, serving simultaneously with his federal post. He represented Escambia County in the territorial council from 1831 to 1833 and again in 1837. He served as a member of the 1838 constitutional convention till January 5, 1839. That year, he became a member of the Territorial Senate.

He left office to work behind the scenes politically. He again served as Pensacola's mayor in 1841-42 and in the Florida Senate in 1845, and again returned to his law practice. In 1850 he became an Alabama and Florida Railroad commissioner. The governor appointed him to the Supreme Court in 1853 to replace Walker Anderson. He was replaced in turn when the voters elected Thomas Baltzell, the first Florida Justice chosen by popular election.

He again returned to his Pensacola business interests and law practice. He became president of the Alabama and Florida Railroad in 1856. He served on the 1865 constitutional convention, but never again served as an elected official. He died on April 28, 1874.
