= Evelyn C. Maxwell =

American judge (1863–1954)

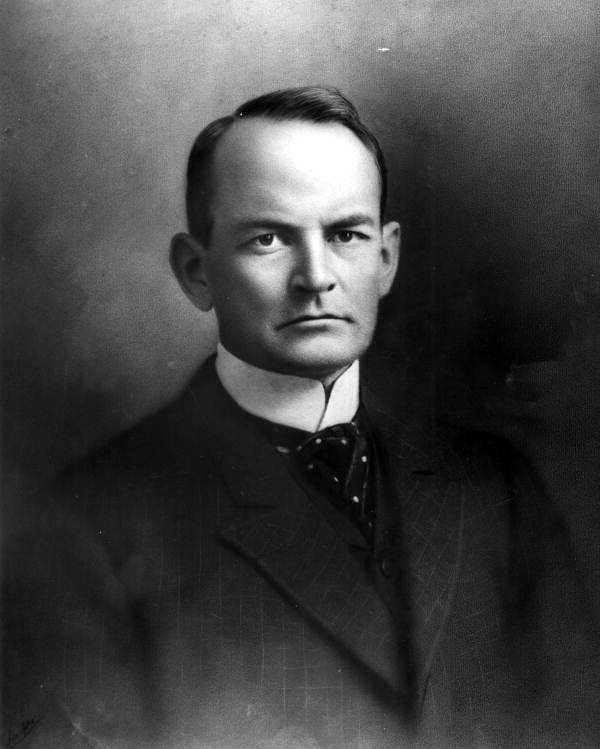
Portrait of Florida Supreme Court Justice Evelyn C. Maxwell (April 1905)

Evelyn Croom Maxwell (July 27, 1863 – November 17, 1954) was a justice of the Florida Supreme Court from 1902 to 1904.

== Biography ==
Maxwell was born in Evergreen, Alabama, on July 27, 1863. His father was the former Florida Secretary of State and Chief Justice Augustus Maxwell, and he was the grandson of former justice Walker Anderson. Maxwell studied in the public and private schools of Pensacola and at the University of Nashville in Tennessee, thereafter entering the practice of law in 1885.

In 1892, Maxwell became a criminal court judge, sitting on the Escambia Criminal Court of Records. He was elevated to Circuit Judge in 1896.

In 1901, the Florida Legislature addressed the court's increasing workload "by authorizing the court to appoint three attorneys to act as commissioners and assist the court in performing its duties". Maxwell was then appointed as a commissioner, along with James F. Glen and William A. Hocker. These appointments lasted until 1902, when a constitutional amendment was passed adding three temporary justices, who would serve until 1905. Maxwell became a Supreme Court justice on December 1, 1902, and served in that position until February 15, 1904, when he submitted his resignation to Governor William Sherman Jennings. As a justice, it is noted that Maxwell "was often teased about the apparent chaos and disorder of his office, even though he could find any document on a minute's notice".

Maxwell died in Pensacola, Florida on November 17, 1954.

Political offices
Preceded by Newly created seat	Justice of the Florida Supreme Court; 1902–1904	Succeeded by James B. Whitfield
