= Vassar B. Carlton =

American judge (1912–2005)

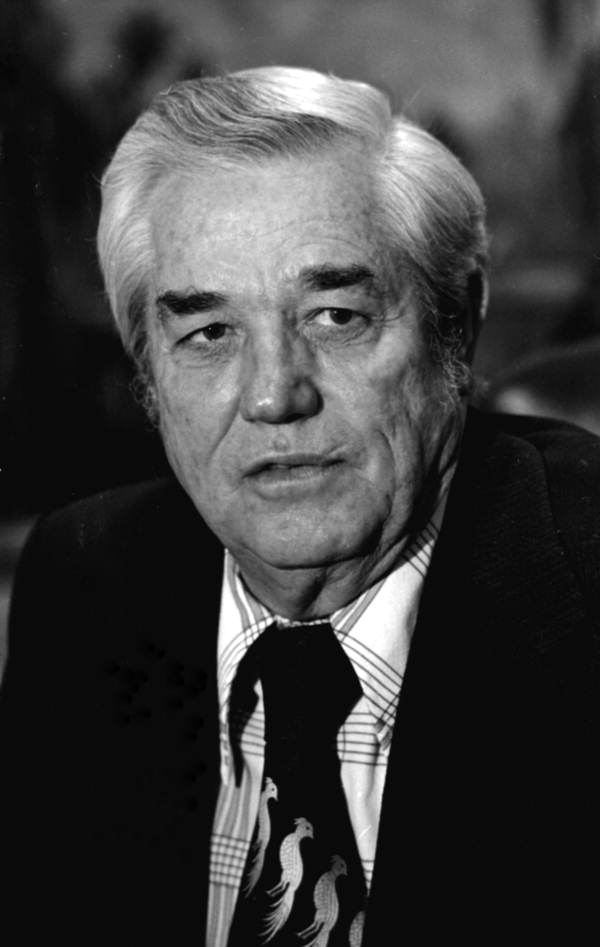
- Carlton in 1969

Chief Justice of the Florida Supreme Court
- In office January 1, 1973 – February 28, 1974
- Preceded by: B. K. Roberts
- Succeeded by: James C. Adkins

Justice of the Florida Supreme Court
- In office January 7, 1969 – February 28, 1974
- Preceded by: Wade L. Hopping
- Succeeded by: Ben Overton

Personal details
- Born: November 13, 1912 Alachua County, Florida, U.S.
- Died: August 31, 2005 (aged 92) Franklin, North Carolina, U.S.

Vassar Benjamin Carlton (November 13, 1912 – August 31, 2005) was a justice of the Florida Supreme Court from 1969 to 1974, serving as chief justice for his final year on the Court.

Born in Alachua County, Florida, Carlton received an LL.B. from Stetson University in 1937, and was elected a Brevard County judge just four years later, in 1941, at 27 years old. He thereafter remained in the judiciary. In 1954, "he was elected Circuit Judge of Florida's old Ninth Circuit" remaining in that office until his election to the Florida Supreme Court in 1968, where he commenced service on January 7, 1969. He was chosen as chief justice for a term beginning January 1, 1973, remaining in that office until his retirement on February 28, 1974.

Carlton died in Franklin, North Carolina.

Political offices
Preceded by Wade L. Hopping	Justice of the Florida Supreme Court; 1969–1974	Succeeded by Ben Overton
