= Wade L. Hopping =

American judge (1931–2009)

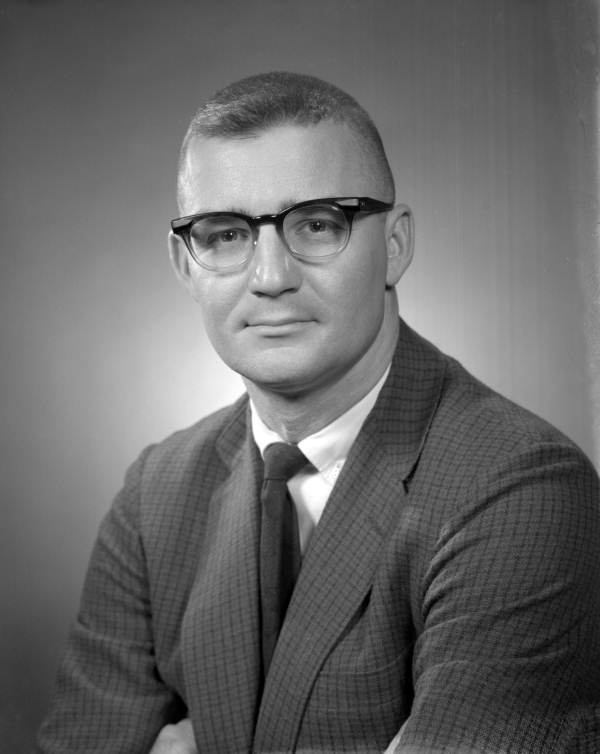

Justice of the Florida Supreme Court
- In office 1968–1969
- Appointed by: Claude Kirk
- Preceded by: Stephen C. O'Connell
- Succeeded by: Vassar B. Carlton

Personal details
- Born: August 12, 1931 Dayton, Ohio, U.S.
- Died: August 11, 2009 (aged 77) Tallahassee, Florida, U.S.
- Party: Republican
- Education: Ohio State University

Military service
- Branch/service: US Army

Wade Lee Hopping (August 12, 1931 – August 11, 2009) was a justice of the Florida Supreme Court from 1968 to 1969. Appointed by Governor Claude Kirk at the age of 37, Wade was the youngest justice to be appointed to the Court. He was defeated in an election for the seat the following year.

Born in Dayton, Ohio, Hopping received a B.A. in Political Science from Ohio State University in 1953, and an L.L.B./J.D. from that university's Moritz College of Law in 1955. While a student at Ohio State, he became a member of the Sigma Chi fraternity. He entered private practice in Columbus, Ohio, then moved to Florida in 1958 to serve as a law clerk for Florida Supreme Court justice T. Frank Hobson. After a brief return to private practice in Palm Beach, Florida from 1960 to 1961, Hopping again clerked on the Florida Supreme Court, this time for Chief Justice William Glenn Terrell, from 1962 to 1964. Hopping became a legislative assistant to Governor Kirk in 1967, leading to Kirk's appointment of Hopping to the Florida Supreme Court the following year.

After leaving the court, Hopping remained in private practice in Tallahassee where he founded the law firm of Hopping Green & Sams. He specialized in the areas of environmental and land use law, often representing utilities and corporate interests in efforts to protect property rights and engage in development activity in compliance with land use restrictions and environmental protections. Hopping died in Tallahassee, Florida of esophageal cancer.

== Sources ==
- "Former Justice Hopping dies", The Florida Bar News (September 1, 2009), p. 3.
- "Wade L. Hopping was a gentleman lobbyist", The Tampa Bay Times (August 11, 2009)
- Wade L. Hopping: Longtime foil for Florida environmentalists, St. Petersburg Times (August 12, 2009).
- "Wade Hopping Memoriam"
