= C. Alan Lawson =

American judge

Alan Lawson
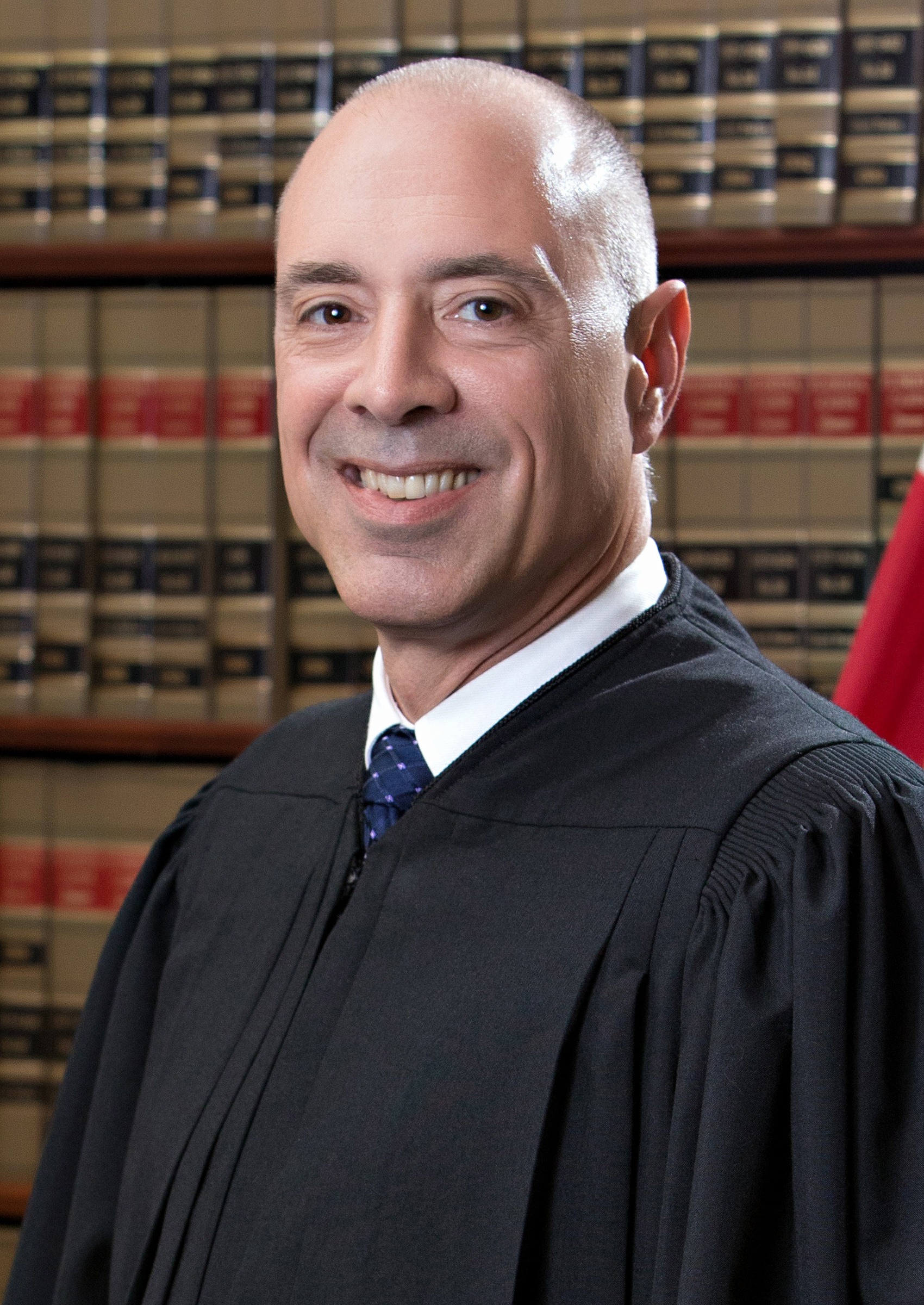

Justice of the Supreme Court of Florida
- In office December 31, 2016 – August 31, 2022
- Appointed by: Rick Scott
- Preceded by: James E. C. Perry
- Succeeded by: Renatha Francis

Judge of the Florida Fifth District Court of Appeal
- In office 2005–2016
- Appointed by: Jeb Bush
- Succeeded by: Eric Eisnaugle

Personal details
- Born: Charles Alan Lawson; May 12, 1961 (age 65) Lakeland, Florida, U.S.
- Education: Tallahassee Community College (AA); Clemson University (BS); Florida State University (JD)

Charles Alan Lawson (born May 12, 1961) is an American attorney and jurist who served as a justice on the Supreme Court of Florida from 2016 to 2022. He previously was a judge on the Florida Fifth District Court of Appeal. He is a founding shareholder with Lawson Huck Gonzalez, PLLC and handles civil and administrative litigation, appeals, and government affairs.

== Biography ==
=== Early life and education ===
Lawson was born on May 12, 1961, in Lakeland, Florida. He received an Associate of Arts degree, summa cum laude, in 1981 from Tallahassee Community College. He received a Bachelor of Science degree, summa cum laude, in 1983 from Clemson University. He received a Juris Doctor, Order of the Coif and summa cum laude, in 1987 from Florida State University College of Law.

=== Career ===
He served as an associate and partner at the law firm of Steel Hector & Davis, Miami and Tallahassee, Florida, from 1987 to 1995. He served as general counsel at Verses Wear, Inc., in 1996. He served as an Assistant County Attorney, Orange County, Florida, from 1997 to 2001. He served as a Judge of the Ninth Judicial Circuit Court of Florida, from 2002 to 2005. He served as a Judge of the Florida Fifth District Court of Appeal from 2005 to 2016 and served as Chief Judge of that Court from 2015 to 2016.

== Florida Supreme Court service ==
On December 16, 2016, Governor Rick Scott appointed Lawson to serve as a justice of the Supreme Court of Florida, to the seat vacated by Justice James E. C. Perry, who retired on December 30, 2016. He was previously nominated by the Florida Judicial Nominating Commission. His appointment became effective on December 31, 2016, with his investiture ceremony occurring on April 5, 2017.

Lawson was retained for a full six year term on November 6, 2018. However, on April 29, 2022 Lawson announced his imminent retirement, effective August 31, 2022.

Legal offices
Preceded by James E. C. Perry	Justice of the Supreme Court of Florida; 2016–2022	Succeeded by Renatha Francis
