= Samuel J. Douglas =

American judge (1812–1873)

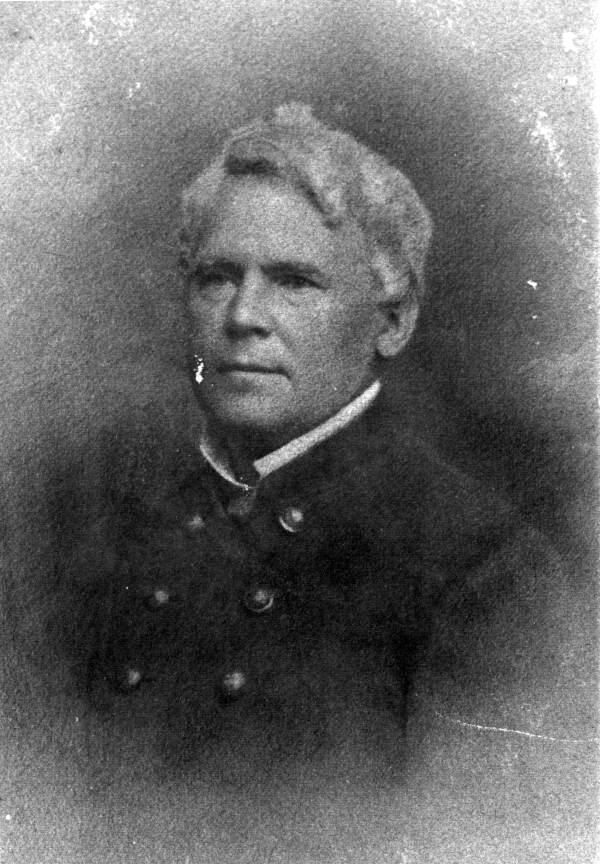
- Douglas in 1866

Justice of the Florida Supreme Court
- In office 1866–1868
- Appointed by: David S. Walker
- Preceded by: Augustus E. Maxwell

Personal details
- Born: October 10, 1812 Petersburg, Virginia, U.S.
- Died: November 14, 1873 (aged 61) Tallahassee, Florida, U.S.

Samuel J. Douglas (October 10, 1812 – November 14, 1873) was an American politician and jurist. A Democrat originally from Virginia, he served on the Florida Territorial Court of Appeals (during the era of Florida Territory) 1841–45 and the Florida Supreme Court 1866–68.

Douglas was born in Petersburg, Virginia. He graduated from the University of Virginia and entered into the practice of law in Southampton County, Virginia.

President John Tyler, a family friend, appointed Douglas to the Florida Territorial Court of Appeals on October 12, 1841, after a mutual friend refused the post and recommended Douglas instead. He subsequently appointed him to a four-year term on February 15, 1842.

This was a tumultuous time in Florida history, and Douglas met the task of restoring the rule of law to curb both criminal offenders and planters and businessmen trying to escape responsibility for their debts. His firmness made him sufficiently unpopular that after statehood, the Florida Legislature did not reappoint him to the Bench. He then opened a legal practice in Tallahassee until he was appointed Collector of Customs at Key West in 1849.

In 1847, he married Elizabeth 'Lizzie' Brown, the daughter of Governor Thomas Brown, after the death of his first wife. He opened a law office in 1853, and practiced law on Key West until outbreak the Civil War. His secessionist tendencies made him persona non grata to Federal authorities, and he returned to Virginia. He served the Confederate States of America as a military judge, and returned to Florida after the cessation of hostilities.

In the summer of 1865, he became a private secretary to Governor William Marvin. In 1866, Governor David S. Walker appointed Douglas to replace Justice Augustus E. Maxwell. He was one of four Justices appointed by Governor Marvin. In the uncertainty of Florida under Federal occupation, Douglas' efforts centered on resolving conflicts Florida and military officials. In 1868, he left the Court to return to private practice.

He died November 14, 1873, in Tallahassee of a stroke.
