= Renatha Francis =

American judge (born 1976 or 1977)

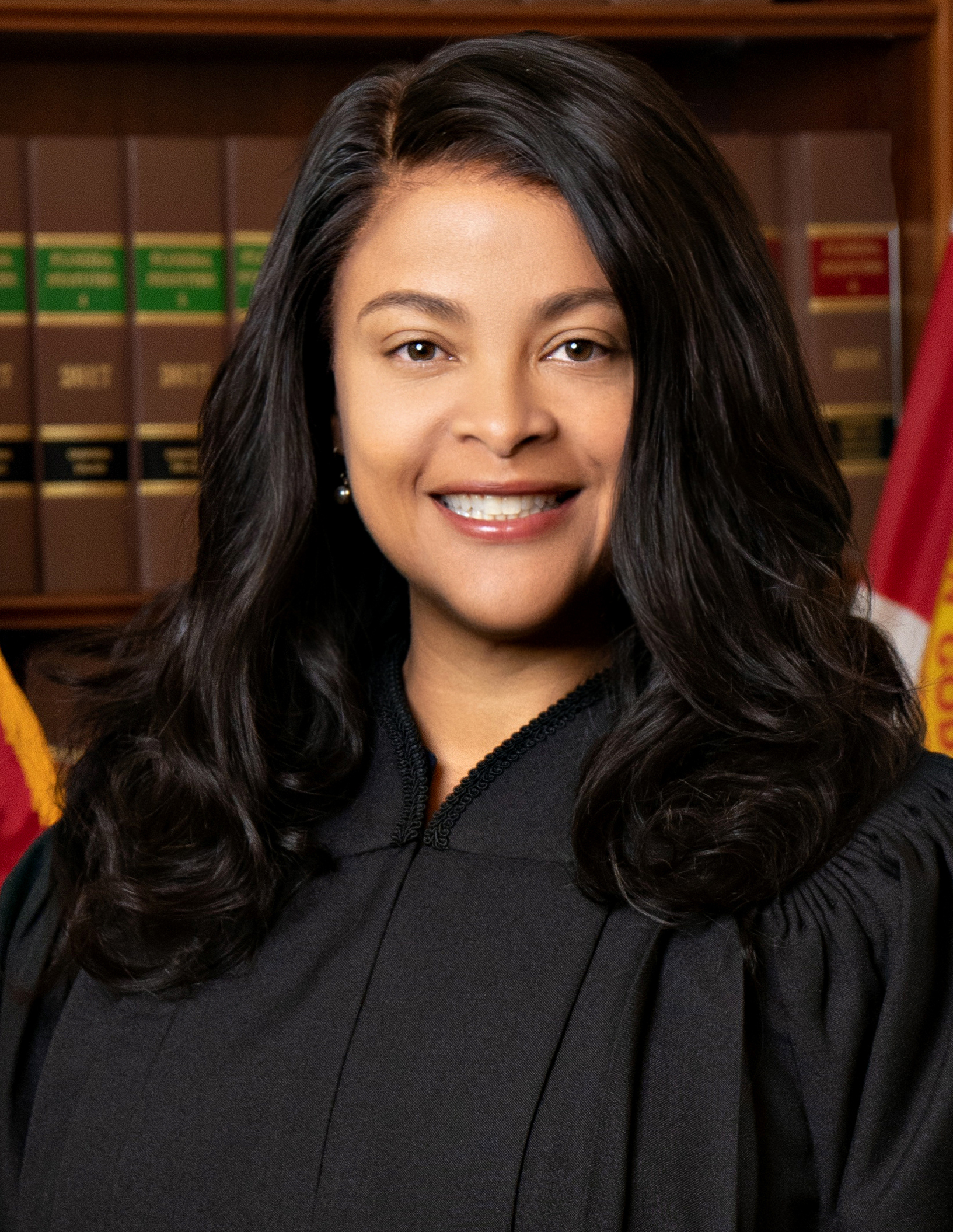

Justice of the Supreme Court of Florida
- Incumbent
- Assumed office September 1, 2022
- Appointed by: Ron DeSantis
- Preceded by: C. Alan Lawson

Judge of the Fifteenth Judicial Circuit Court of Florida
- In office November 4, 2019 – September 1, 2022
- Appointed by: Ron DeSantis
- Preceded by: Meenu Sasser
- Succeeded by: vacant

Judge of the Eleventh Judicial Circuit Court of Florida
- In office June 4, 2018 – November 4, 2019
- Appointed by: Rick Scott
- Preceded by: Sarah I. Zabel
- Succeeded by: Ramiro Areces

Judge of the Miami-Dade County Court
- In office August 14, 2017 – June 4, 2018
- Appointed by: Rick Scott
- Preceded by: Jason Dimitris

Personal details
- Born: November 23, 1977 (age 48) Portmore, Jamaica
- Education: University of the West Indies (BS); Florida Coastal School of Law (JD)

Renatha Sian Francis (born November 23, 1977) is an American lawyer who has served as a justice of the Supreme Court of Florida since 2022. She previously served as a circuit judge in Palm Beach County from 2019 to 2022.

== Early life, education, and career ==
Francis was born and raised in Jamaica. She attended St Hugh's High School and the University of the West Indies, receiving a Bachelor of Science, magna cum laude, in 2001. Francis operated a bar and a trucking company while attending college in Jamaica.

Francis moved to Florida in 2004 and graduated from Florida Coastal School of Law with a Juris Doctor in 2010. She began her legal career as a law clerk at Florida's First District Court of Appeal in Tallahassee from 2011 to 2017.

Francis worked briefly as a litigator at the law firm Shutts & Bowen in Miami before being appointed to the Miami-Dade County Court in 2017 by Governor Rick Scott. Scott elevated her to Miami-Dade's Eleventh Judicial Circuit Court in 2018, and Governor Ron DeSantis laterally appointed her to the Fifteenth Judicial Circuit Court in Palm Beach County in 2019. Francis was assigned to the probate and family division at the Fifteenth Circuit.

== Florida Supreme Court ==
=== 2020 nomination ===
On January 23, 2020, the Florida Judicial Nominating Commission submitted a list of names for two existing Florida Supreme Court vacancies to the Governor. Under the state constitution, the Governor was allowed up to 60 days to make an appointment from that list of a person constitutionally eligible for the office. Francis's name was on the list.

On May 26, 2020, Governor Ron DeSantis announced he was appointing Francis to the Supreme Court of Florida. Had she been allowed to take her seat, Francis would have been the first non-Cuban Caribbean-American on the court and possibly the first non-Cuban Caribbean-American to sit on any state’s supreme court. DeSantis said the delay in making the appointment was due to conditions created by the coronavirus pandemic.

Because the Florida Constitution requires Supreme Court justices to have been a member of the Florida Bar for ten years, Francis was ineligible. At first, she did not plan to take her seat until September 24, 2020, when she reached the ten-year mark. For this reason, Representative Geraldine Thompson filed a petition with the Supreme Court of Florida to invalidate the appointment and require the State's Judicial Nominating Commission to certify a new list of nominees for the Governor to appoint from.

On August 27, 2020, the Court ruled that Governor DeSantis exceeded his authority in appointing Judge Francis because she was not eligible. However, the court also ruled that the proper remedy was to require the governor to choose someone else's name from the list previously submitted to him, and it denied the petition as Thompson did not seek that remedy. Subsequently, Representative Thompson sought rehearing and asked to amend her petition. The Court denied rehearing but granted amendment to seek the proper remedy.

On September 11, 2020, the Court granted Representative Thompson's petition and ordered Governor DeSantis to appoint someone else from the same list. The court determined that Judge Francis was ineligible by the date the appointment was required to be made on March 23, 2020, the end of the 60-day period imposed by the state constitution. Later that same day, Judge Francis withdrew her name from further consideration. The following Monday, before announcing the appointment of Jamie Grosshans to the Florida Supreme Court, DeSantis announced that he recommended Francis to then President Donald Trump for appointment to the Federal Southern District of Florida. Trump did not appoint her.

=== 2022 appointment ===
In 2022, Justice Alan Lawson announced his retirement from the Supreme Court of Florida. Francis, who was now eligible, applied to succeed him. She was favored for the appointment.

On August 5, 2022, Governor DeSantis announced Francis's new appointment to the Supreme Court of Florida, effective September 1, 2022. She is the court's first Jamaican-American justice.

== Personal life ==
She and her late husband Phillip are the parents of two sons.

Legal offices
Preceded by C. Alan Lawson	Justice of the Supreme Court of Florida; 2022–present	Incumbent
