= Joseph B. Wall =

American politician

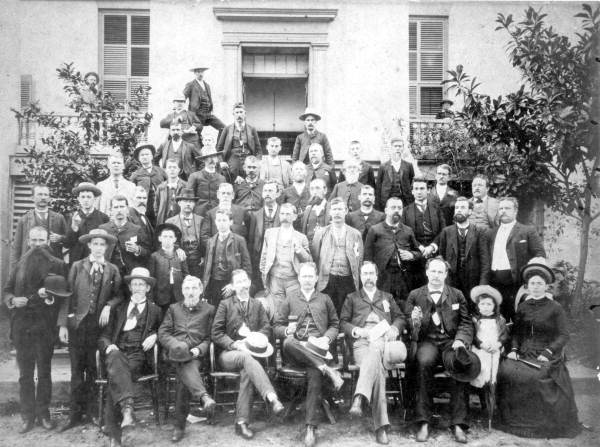
Members of the Florida Senate gathered on the capitol steps for a group portrait - Tallahassee, Florida circa 1889, Joseph B. Wall in middle of front row holding gavel

Joseph Baidsen Wall (January 23, 1847 - 1911 or December 21, 1912) was a lawyer, state legislator, and criminal court judge in Florida. He also served as state's attorney. He served in the Florida Senate in 1889 and was senate president. A photo was taken of him with his fellow state senators on the capitol steps by Alvan S. Harper.

He was Judge Perry Wall's son from his second marriage to Barbara Baisden (died May 30, 1883).

He studied at the University of Virginia. He married Precious Ederington of Brooksville. He reportedly attacked James T. Magbee over Magbee's coverage of one of his family members. He was disbarred from Federal court for allegedly tying a hangman's knot in March 1882 used to lynch an itinerant sailor in front of the courthouse in Tampa.
