= Robert S. Cockrell =

American judge (1866–1957)

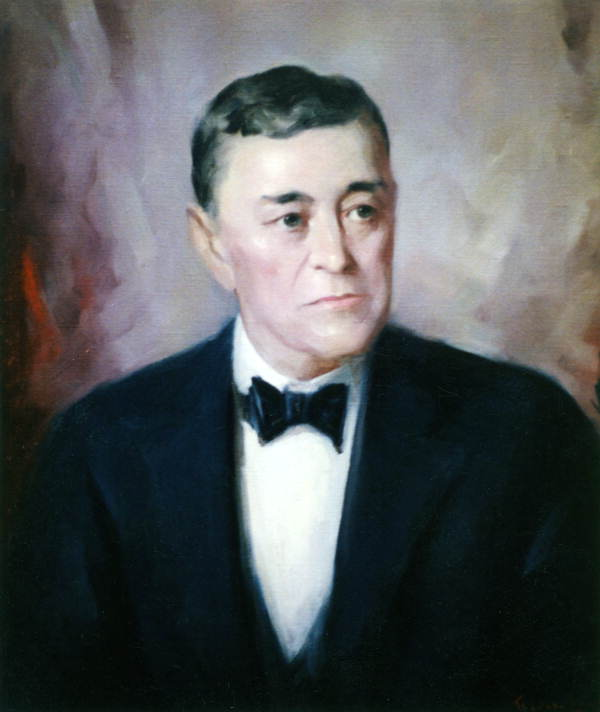
Painted portrait of Florida Supreme Court Justice Robert S. Cockrell (circa 1900)

Robert Spratt Cockrell (January 22, 1866 – June 23, 1957) was a justice of the Florida Supreme Court from December 1, 1902, to January 2, 1917.

Cockrell's appointment was inadvertent. Governor William Sherman Jennings had meant to appoint Robert's brother Alston Cockrell.

Cockrell served on the court until he was defeated in his third reelection campaign by Jefferson B. Browne in 1916. He allegedly lost the election because an opinion he wrote that alienated railroad interests which then lobbied for Browne. He lectured at the University of Florida College of Law from 1919 until 1940, and his students included Harold Sebring and Richard Ervin.

He was on the losing side of a 3-2 decision on referendums that was passed by both the House and Senate in Florida but not signed.

Cockrell was born in Livingston, Alabama He obtained his bachelor's degree, masters and law degrees from the University of Virginia, then going on to study for a year at Humboldt University in Berlin. He then passed the bar two years later in 1891.

He wife Courtney, the daughter of Florida governor David S. Walker had died before him, they had two daughters and two sons.

He died in Miami, Florida at the age of 91. He had been living in Coconut Grove with one of his daughters at this time.

Political offices
Preceded by Newly created seat	Justice of the Florida Supreme Court; 1902–1917	Succeeded by Jefferson B. Browne
