= James E. C. Perry =

American judge

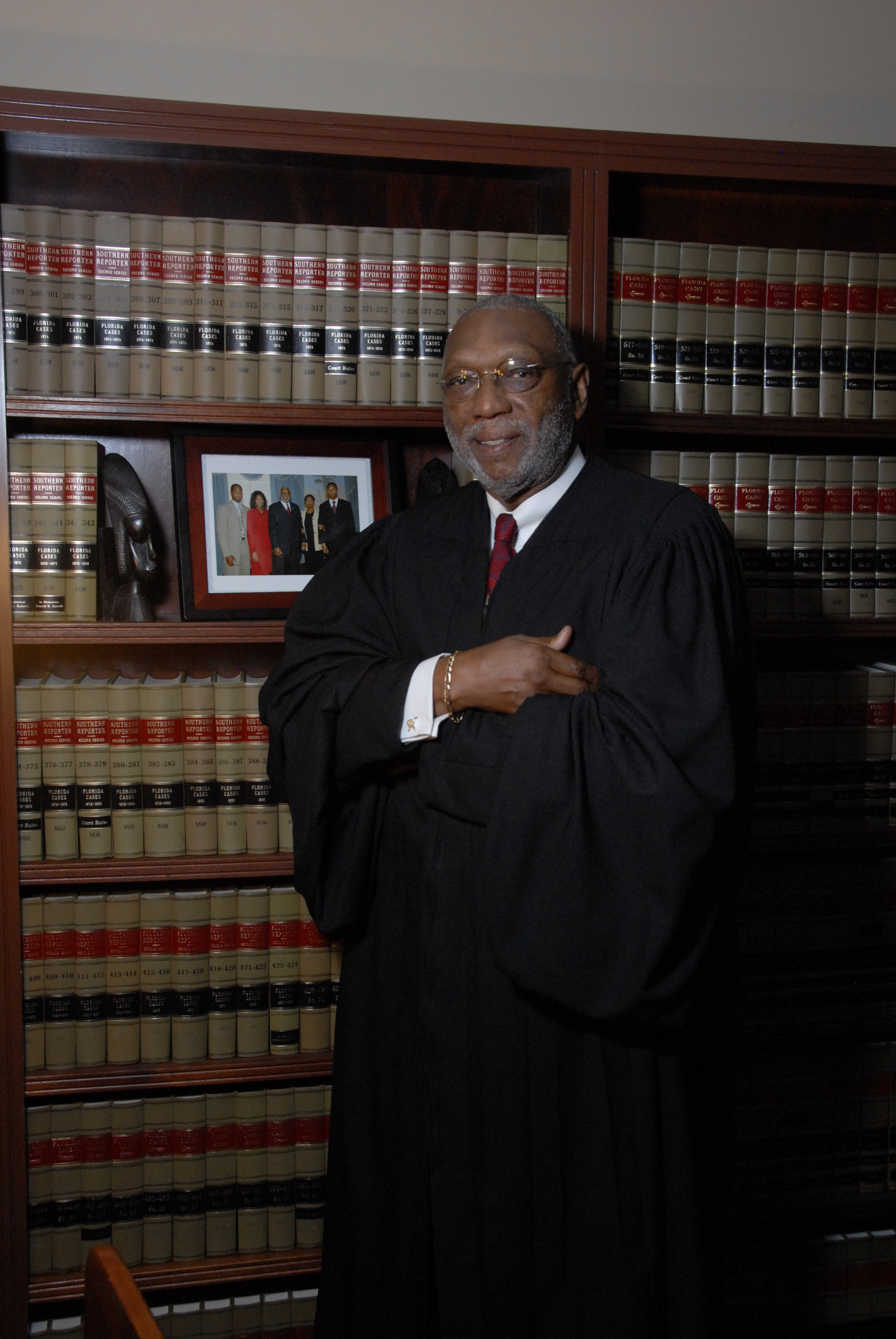
- 2014 portrait

Justice for the Florida Supreme Court
- In office March 11, 2009 – December 30, 2016
- Appointed by: Charlie Crist
- Preceded by: Charles T. Wells
- Succeeded by: C. Alan Lawson

Personal details
- Born: 1944 (age 81–82) New Bern, North Carolina
- Spouse: Dr. Adrienne M. Perry
- Education: Columbia Law School (J.D.); St. Augustine's College (B.A.)
- Website: Florida Supreme Court Bio

James E. C. Perry (born 1944) is an American judge. He is a former justice of the Supreme Court of Florida.

== Early life ==
James E.C. Perry was born in 1944. He earned a Bachelor of Arts in Business Administration and Accounting from St. Augustine’s College (now St. Augustine’s University) in 1966, becoming the first member of his family to graduate from college. Following his undergraduate studies, he served as a first lieutenant in the United States Army before attending Columbia Law School, where he earned his Juris Doctor in 1972. While at Columbia, he met his wife, Adrienne; the couple has three children, two of whom are attorneys.

Perry was the founder and president of the Jackie Robinson Sports Association, the largest baseball league in the nation serving at-risk youth, with over 650 boys and girls participating.

== Judicial career ==
In 1972, Perry filed a federal lawsuit against the Georgia Board of Bar Examiners after he and 49 other Black applicants took the Georgia bar exam and none passed, despite Perry having passed the multistate portion of the exam. Concerned about potential racial discrimination, Perry convened a meeting with the other unsuccessful Black applicants, and 16 agreed to join the lawsuit. The remaining applicants declined, concerned that pursuing the case could result in professional retaliation.

While the case was still pending, the following year saw a significant increase in the number of successful Black bar examinees in Georgia—48 new Black attorneys passed the exam, more than doubling the number of Black attorneys in the state at the time.

Perry began his legal career as a partner at the firm Perry & Hicks, P.A., specializing in civil and business law.

Perry served as a circuit judge in Florida's Eighteenth Judicial Circuit, following his appointment by Governor Jeb Bush in March 2000. He became the first African American to be appointed to that circuit. In July 2003, he began a two-year term as chief judge of the Eighteenth Judicial Circuit. Following his initial appointment, Perry was elected without opposition to retain his seat on the bench.

He was appointed by Governor Charlie Crist to the Supreme Court of Florida in March 2009 to replace retiring Justice Charles T. Wells and was Crist's fourth appointment to the Supreme Court. Perry is the 85th justice to take office at the Florida Supreme Court since statehood was granted in 1845.

Perry was barred from running for retention in 2016 due to the State Constitution's mandatory retirement age restrictions and was due to leave office on January 3, 2017, at the end of his term. However, on September 12, 2016, Perry notified Governor Rick Scott of his intention to retire on December 30, 2016. He was succeeded by Justice C. Alan Lawson.

== Awards and honors ==
Justice Perry has received numerous awards and honors throughout his career, including:

- Moot Court Competition Award, Puerto Rican Bar Association (2014)
- Key to the City of Titusville (2014)
- President's Award, Florida Memorial University (2014)
- Award of Appreciation, North Brevard County Branch NAACP (2014)
- Humanitarian Award, Seminole County NAACP
- Paul C. Perkins Award, Orange County Chapter NAACP
- Martin Luther King Drum Major Award for Social Justice (2005)
- Key to the City of New Bern, North Carolina (2004)
- Profiled honoree, An Evening of Stars: A Celebration of Educational Excellence, United Negro College Fund (2005)
- Williams-Johnson Outstanding Jurist of the Year Award, Brevard and Seminole County Bar Associations (2006)

He has also received honorary Doctor of Law degrees from Stetson University College of Law and Nova Southeastern University College of Law. Justice Perry has delivered commencement addresses at several institutions, including the University of Central Florida, Florida A&M University College of Law, Stetson University College of Law, Barry University School of Law, and Saint Augustine’s University. Seminole County's James E. C. Perry Courthouse Annex, which opened in 2024, bears his name.

== See also ==
- List of African-American jurists

Legal offices
Preceded by Charles T. Wells	Justice of the Florida Supreme Court; 2009–2016	Succeeded by C. Alan Lawson
