= Florida Territorial Court of Appeals =

The Florida Territorial Court of Appeals was a court system during the time of the Florida Territory. Samuel J. Douglas served on it.

== Supreme Court rulings limiting the power of Article I and Article IV tribunals ==
The concept of a legislative court was first defined by Chief Justice John Marshall in the case of American Ins. Co. v. 356 Bales of Cotton, 1 Pet. 511 (1828), which is sometimes referred to as Canter, after a claimant in the case. In this case, a court in what was then the Territory of Florida had made a ruling on the disposition of some bales of cotton that had been recovered from a sunken ship. This clearly fell into the realm of admiralty law, which is part of the federal judicial power according to Article III of the Constitution. Yet the judges of the Florida Territorial Court had four-year terms, not the lifetime appointments required by Article III of the Constitution. Marshall's solution was to declare that territorial courts were established under Article I of the constitution. As such, they could not exercise the federal judicial power, and therefore the law that placed admiralty cases in their jurisdiction was unconstitutional.

Tenure that is guaranteed by the Constitution is a badge of a judge of an Article III court. The argument that mere statutory tenure is sufficient for judges of Article III courts was authoritatively answered in Ex parte Bakelite Corp.:

== See also ==
- Florida Constitution
