= Charles T. Wells =

American judge

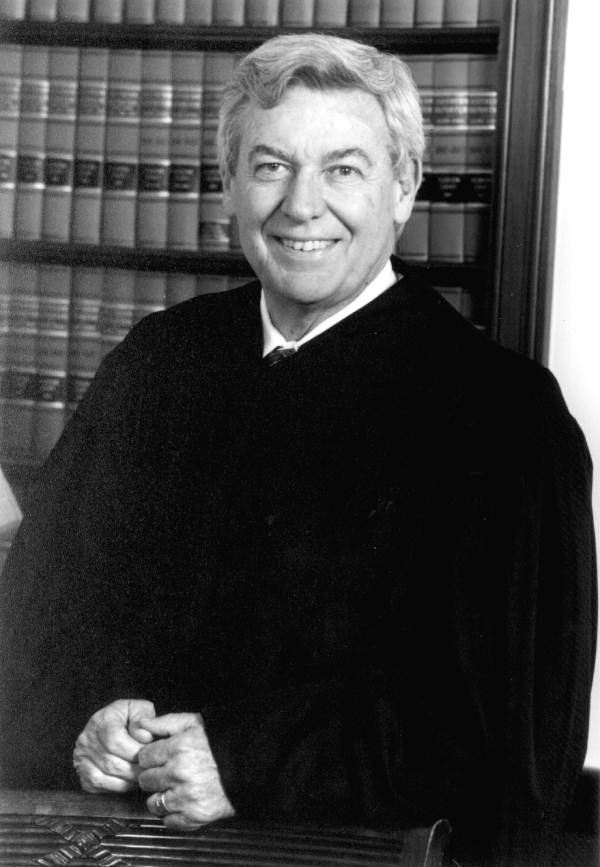

Chief Justice of the Florida Supreme Court
- In office July 1, 2000 – June 30, 2002
- Preceded by: Major Harding
- Succeeded by: Harry Lee Anstead

Justice of the Supreme Court of Florida
- In office 1994 – March 3, 2009
- Appointed by: Lawton Chiles
- Preceded by: Parker Lee McDonald
- Succeeded by: James E. C. Perry

Personal details
- Born: March 4, 1939 (age 87) Orlando, Florida, U.S.
- Party: Democratic

Charles Talley Wells (born March 4, 1939) is a former member of the Florida Supreme Court from 1994 until March 3, 2009, when he retired. He was appointed by Governor Lawton Chiles. He served as chief justice from July 1, 2000, until June 30, 2002.

Wells presided over appeals brought to the Court as part of the dispute over Florida's electoral votes in the 2000 U.S. presidential election, which were broadcast live to a worldwide audience. Wells dissented from the majority opinion that ordered a recount to decide the presidential election.

He is the author of Inside Bush v. Gore, which was released in April 2013. It was the first book to be published by one of the judges at the center of the Bush v. Gore controversy.

He graduated from William R. Boone High School in 1957. Wells received his bachelor's degree from the University of Florida in 1961 and received his Juris Doctor degree from the University of Florida College of Law (now named the Levin College of Law) in 1964.
