= Thomas Douglas (American judge) =

American judge

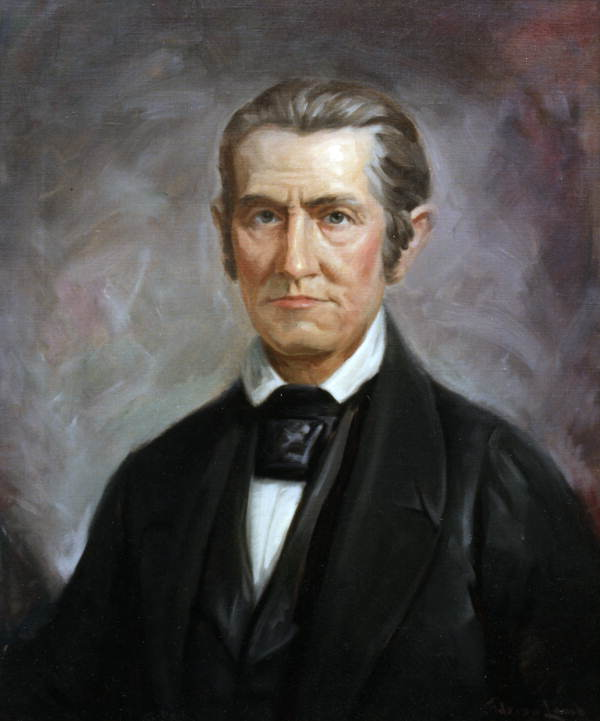
Painted portrait of Florida Supreme Court Justice Thomas Douglas circa. 1846

Thomas Douglas (April 27, 1790 – September 11, 1855) was an American lawyer and judge. He served as the first chief justice of the Florida Supreme Court from January 1846 to 1851, and then again as a Justice 1854–1855.

Douglas was born in 1790 in Wallingford, Connecticut, in New Haven County. He served as U.S. District Attorney for the Eastern District of Florida from 1826 to 1846. He served on the Florida State Supreme Court from 1846 to 1851 and again from 1854 to 1855.

His father was a shoemaker and farmer. He attended the public schools and was tutored by an aunt. He married Hannah Sanford September 26, 1814. In 1815, he moved to Indiana, where he engaged in manufacturing and mercantile, though the financial Panic of 1819 left him deeply in debt. He was friends with members of Indiana's political leadership, who helped him establish a political career. He distinguished himself by being elected a judge in Jefferson County, Indiana two years before being admitted to the bar in 1822. He followed his mentor Judge Davis Floyd to Florida around 1824.

He was appointed District Attorney for East Florida in 1826 by President John Quincy Adams. He was named to the Florida Supreme Court in 1845. He became a circuit judge in 1851 during a reorganization of the courts. He was elected to the Supreme Court in 1854. He died of pleurisy in 1855.
