= Albert G. Semmes =

American judge

Albert G. Semmes (August 18, 1810 – November 25, 1883) was an American lawyer in the states of Georgia and Florida. He was a member of the Whig Party, elected as a delegate to the 1838 Florida Constitutional Convention and was appointed by the Florida Legislature to the Florida Supreme Court where he served from 1851 to 1853. He then moved to New Orleans.

Semmes was born August 18, 1810, at Sand Hills near Augusta, Georgia, the son of Andrew Green and Frances née Herbert Semmes. He was related to Admiral Raphael Semmes of the Confederate States Navy and Senator Thomas Semmes of Louisiana.

Semmes graduated from the University of Georgia and became a member of the bar by reading law. On February 22, 1834, he married his cousin, Isabella V. Semmes. He was appointed solicitor general for Georgia's southern circuit by Governor Wilson Lumpkin. In 1837, he and his wife moved to Florida, where he became active politically as a pro-statehood, pro-banking Middle Florida Whig.

Franklin County elected him a delegate to the St. Joseph Florida Constitutional Convention in 1838. His bid for election as mayor of Apalachicola in 1840 was not successful. The Legislature appointed him to the Florida Supreme Court in January 1851. He stood for popular election in 1853, but was not re-elected. Semmes then moved to New Orleans, where he practiced law. He died on November 25, 1883.
