= Alan C. Sundberg =

American judge (1933–2002)

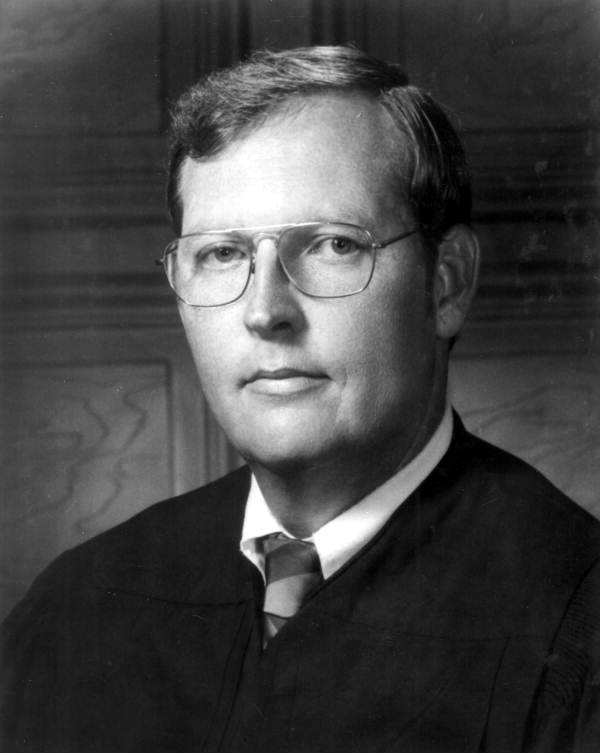
- Sundberg in 1975

Chief Justice of the Florida Supreme Court
- In office July 1, 1980 – June 30, 1982

Justice of the Florida Supreme Court
- In office June 2, 1975 – September 15, 1982
- Appointed by: Reubin Askew

Personal details
- Born: June 23, 1933 Jacksonville, Florida, U.S.
- Died: January 25, 2002 (aged 68) Jacksonville, Florida, U.S.

Alan Carl Sundberg (June 23, 1933 – January 25, 2002) was a justice of the Florida Supreme Court from June 2, 1975, to September 15, 1982, serving as chief justice from July 1, 1980, to June 30, 1982.

Born in Jacksonville, Florida, Sundberg received a B.A. from Florida State University in 1955, and a J.D. from Harvard Law School in 1958.

Sundberg was appointed to the Florida Supreme Court by Governor Reubin Askew. While serving on the court, he authored a noted opinion allowing cameras in Florida courtrooms. After leaving the court, Sundberg was of counsel to the law firm of Smith, Ballard & Logan, and was appointed by Governor Jeb Bush to serve as a trustee of Florida State University.

Sundberg died at the Mayo Clinic in Jacksonville from lung cancer, having been a pipe smoker.
