= George W. MacRae =

American judge

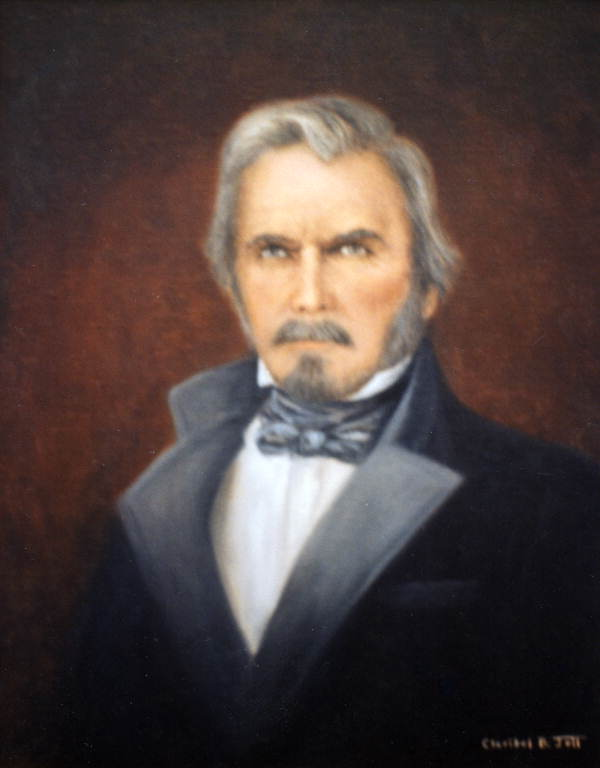
Official portrait depicting Florida Supreme Court Justice George W. Macrae. (circa 1847); there is no accurate record of Macrae's appearance, and the official portrait was "entirely from the imagination of the artist, Claribel Jett, and is a close likeness of her uncle dressed in fanciful clothing".

George W. MacRae (June 24, 1802 – March 6, 1858) was a Florida Supreme Court Justice from January 1, 1847, to January 7, 1848.

On August 24, 1842, MacRae was appointed United States Attorney for the Southern District of Florida by President John Tyler. He was elected to the Territorial Senate two years later, representing South Florida. He was chosen as Senate President as he had no strong party affiliations and was thought to be able to act fairly. In 1846, he was again appointed to the Florida Supreme Court, as an impartial compromise appointee. In 1847, the Whigs gained sufficient control of the legislature to replace the non partisan MacRae with Joseph B. Lancaster.

Macrae then moved to California in 1849, and the following year was an unsuccessful candidate for election to the California Supreme Court. He remained in the state, practicing law in San Francisco, but died in Kentucky while visiting family in that state.
