= Thomas Baltzell =

American judge (1804–1866)

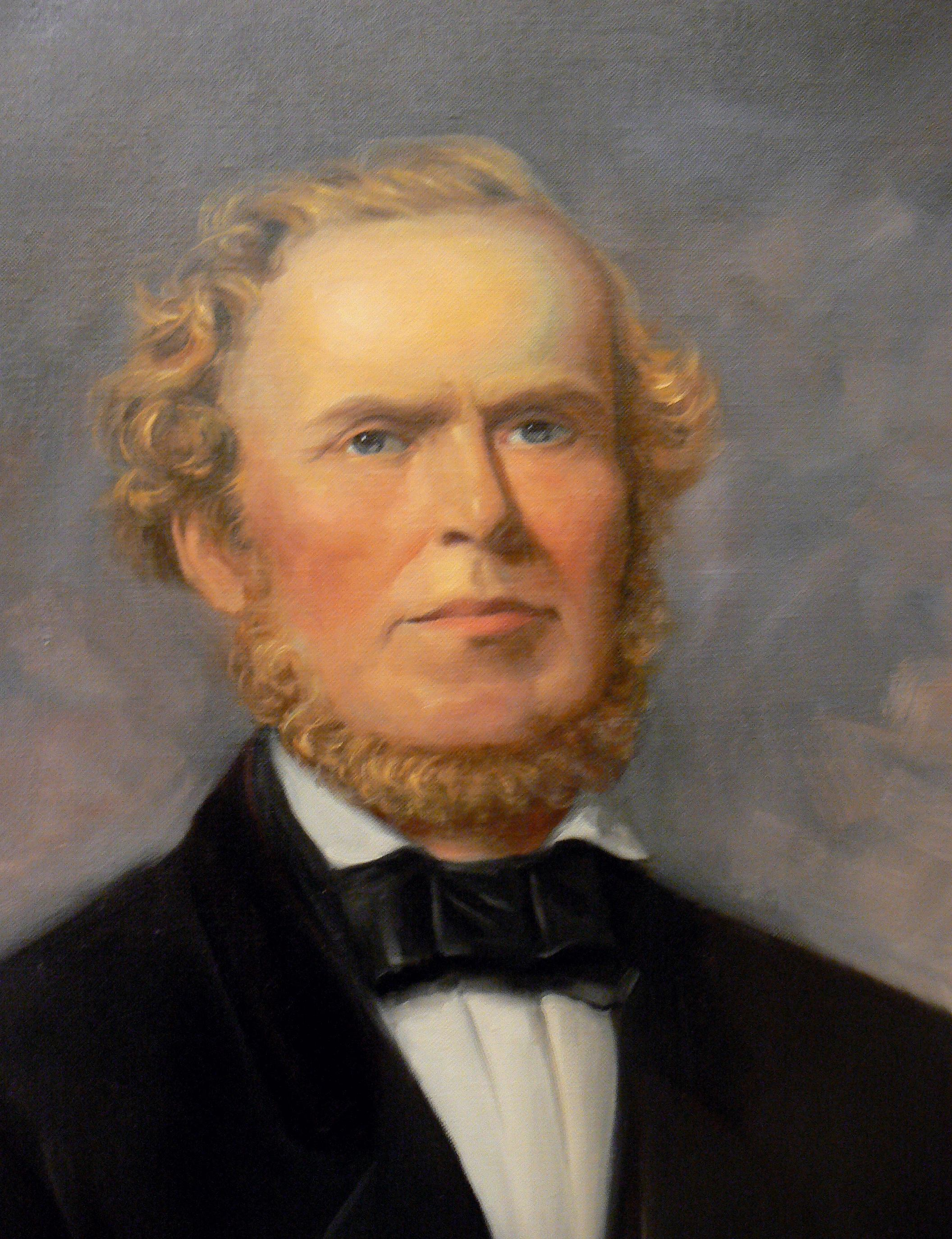
- Born: July 11, 1804; Frankfort, Kentucky
- Died: January 14, 1866 (aged 61)
- Occupations: lawyer and politician

Thomas Baltzell (July 11, 1804 – January 14, 1866) was an American lawyer and politician who was the first popularly elected chief justice of the Florida Supreme Court. Baltzell was also a Florida Territory Senator and a Florida State Representative as well as a Florida Constitutional Convention delegate for two of the state's Constitutions.

== Early life ==
Baltzell was born in Frankfort, Kentucky and studied law with Kentucky Attorney General Solomon P. Sharp, attaining his license at age 20. Following his friend Florida Governor William Pope Duval, Baltzell moved to Florida in 1825. Baltzell was well known to have a fiery temper which surfaced in October 1832 when he and James Westcott engaged in a duel near the Alabama border. Baltzell was uninjured while Westcott was only slightly injured and eventually became a U.S. Senator.

== Political career ==
Soon after his duel with Westcott, Baltzell was elected to represent Jackson County on the Florida Territorial Legislative Council. In 1834, Governor Duval appointed Baltzell as justice of the peace for Escambia County. That year he married Harriet King. The couple had six children by 1850. In 1838, Baltzell served on the Constitutional Convention and signed the 1838 Florida Constitution. Later that year, he ran for the territory delegation to the U.S. House of Representatives on an anti-bank stance but lost to Charles Downing.

Baltzell was on the Tallahassee City Commission from 1840 to 1842 and served on the Florida Territorial Senate from 1844 to 1846.

== Judicial career ==
Florida became a state in 1845 and the legislature elected Baltzell as the middle circuit Supreme Court judge. He was on the bench from the court's first session in January 1846 until 1850. He then won the first popular elections for Chief Justice beginning his term in 1854.

In 1859, Chief Justice Baltzell's temper became noteworthy when he ordered the arrest of fellow Justice Bird M. Pearson when Pearson was tardy for the session. When Pearson arrived, Baltzell was overruled. With elections approaching, Baltzell became embroiled in a public feud with another justice, Charles H. DuPont, over a lower-court judge. In the end, DuPont won the 1859 election ending Baltzell's time on the Supreme Court.

== Return to political office ==
With the American Civil War raging, Baltzell recovered from his Supreme Court loss and won a seat in the Florida House of Representatives from 1862 to 1863. After the war, Baltzell was a member of the 1865 Florida Constitutional Convention. The Constitution was ineffective and Radical Reconstruction ensued. Florida was readmitted to the United States in 1868, two years after Baltzell's death in Tallahassee.

One of his children, George L. Baltzell, held various public offices.
