= Walker Anderson =

American lawyer and politician (1801–1857)

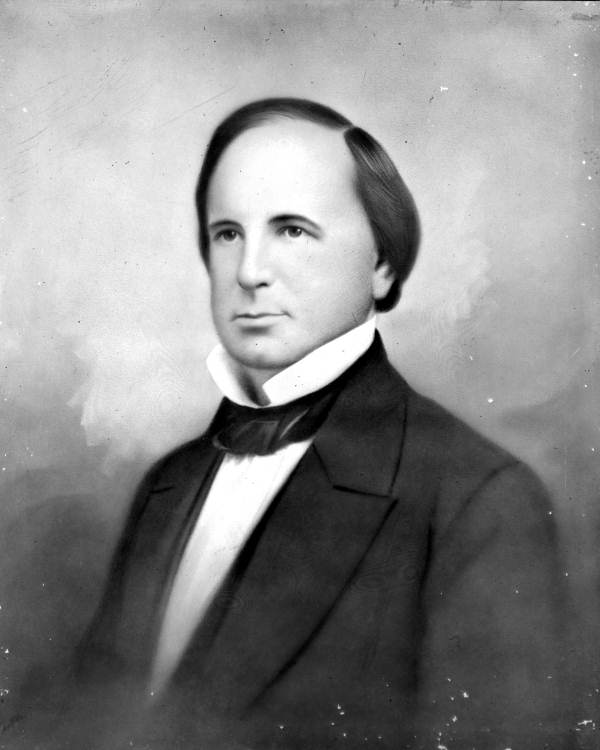
- Born: July 18, 1801; Petersburg, Virginia, U.S.
- Died: January 18, 1857 (aged 48); Pensacola, Florida, U.S.
- Occupations: Lawyer politician
- Political party: Democratic
- Family: Evelyn C. Maxwell (grandson)

Walker Anderson (July 18, 1801 – January 18, 1857) was an American lawyer and Democratic politician who served on the Florida Supreme Court from 1851 to 1853.

== Biography ==
He was born in Petersburg, Virginia, on July 18, 1801. He studied law at Raleigh, North Carolina and married Phoebe Hawks. He practiced law and was a professor of English and of history at the University of North Carolina from 1831 to 1832. In 1835, he moved to Pensacola during the Second Seminole War. He was unsuccessful in a number of business ventures, and opened a law practice. He was a charter member of the Florida Democratic Party.

Escambia County elected him a delegate to the 1838 St. Joseph constitutional convention. As a delegate, he supported anti bank policies and statehood, and opposed division of the territory. In 1840, he was elected to the Territorial House of Representatives. In May 1841, President John Tyler appointed him United States attorney for West Florida. He prosecuted abolitionist Jonathan Walker in 1844. He became a Territorial Senator in 1845. His bid for election to the Florida State Senate was not successful. In 1847, was appointed West Florida Commissioner of Public Schools. He returned to the Florida Legislature in 1850, where he supported separation of the Florida Supreme Court and popular election of justices. He was chosen in 1851 by the Legislature as Chief Justice to the Florida Supreme Court. In 1853, returned to his legal practice in Pensacola. He died in Pensacola on January 18, 1857.

Anderson's grandson, Evelyn C. Maxwell, also served as a justice of the Florida Supreme Court.
