= Amy Coney Barrett Supreme Court nomination =

United States Supreme Court nomination

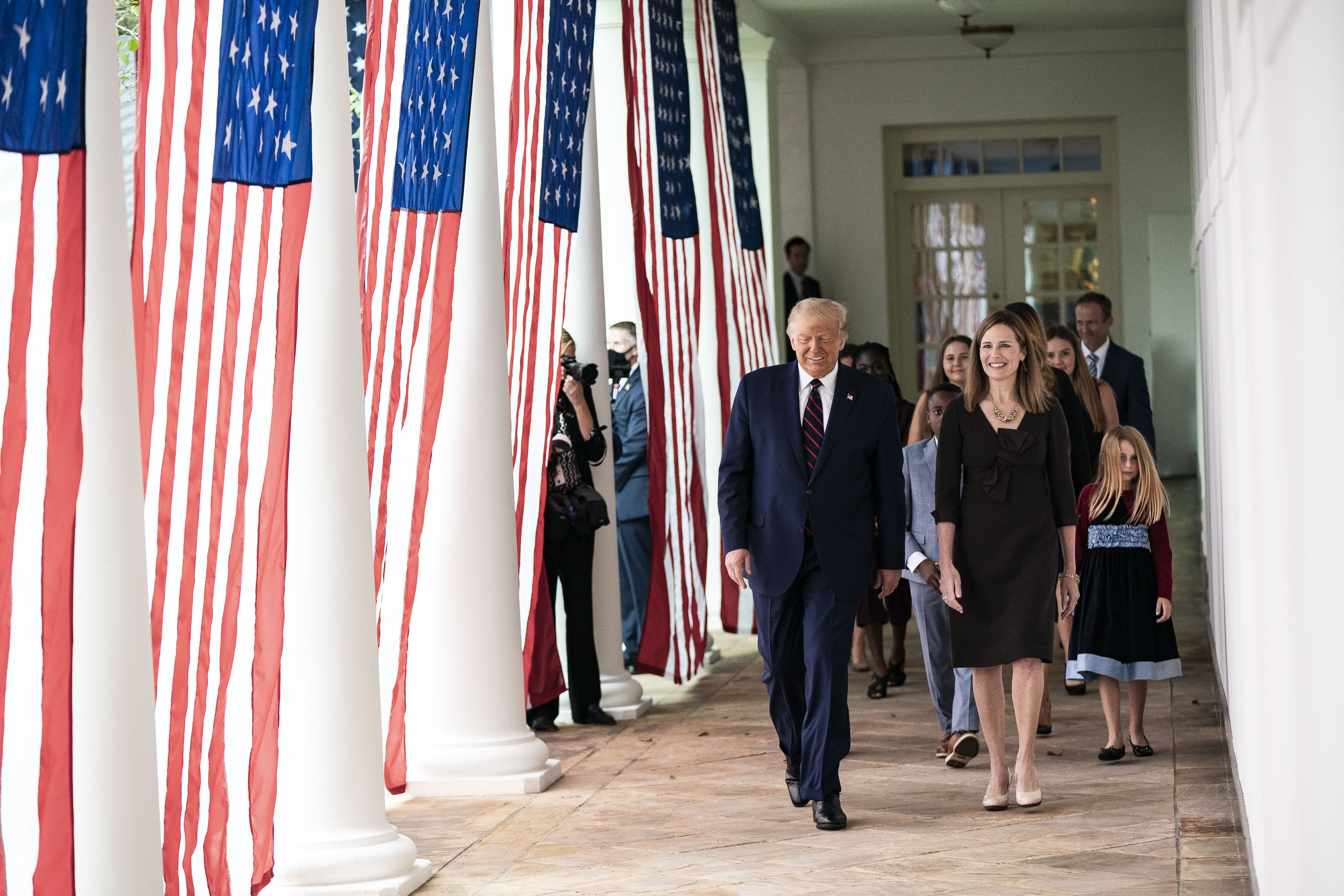
- President Trump with Amy Coney Barrett and her family just prior to Barrett being announced as his nominee to the Supreme Court (September 26, 2020)
- Nominee: Amy Coney Barrett
- Nominated by: Donald Trump (president of the United States)
- Succeeding: Ruth Bader Ginsburg (associate justice)
- Date nominated: September 26, 2020
- Date confirmed: October 26, 2020
- Outcome: Approved by the U.S. Senate

Vote of the Senate Judiciary Committee
- Votes in favor: 12
- Votes against: 0
- Not voting: 10
- Result: Reported favorably

Senate cloture vote
- Votes in favor: 51
- Votes against: 48
- Not voting: 1
- Result: Cloture invoked

Senate confirmation vote
- Votes in favor: 52
- Votes against: 48
- Result: Confirmed

On September 26, 2020, President Donald Trump announced the nomination of Amy Coney Barrett to the position of Associate Justice of the Supreme Court of the United States to fill in the vacancy left by the death of Ruth Bader Ginsburg. At the time of her nomination, Barrett was a Judge of the United States Court of Appeals for the Seventh Circuit in Chicago, Illinois. The Senate received word from the president (when a Supreme Court nomination becomes official) on September 29.

On October 26, the Senate voted to confirm Barrett's nomination to the Supreme Court, with 52 of 53 Republicans voting in favor, while Susan Collins and all 47 Democrats voted against; Barrett took the judicial oath on October 27. Democrats rebuked Republicans and accused them of hypocrisy, stating that they had violated their own interpretation of the Biden rule, which they set in 2016 when they refused to consider then-President Obama's nomination of Merrick Garland more than nine months before the end of his term. The 35 days between the nomination and the 2020 presidential election marked the shortest period of time between a nomination to the Supreme Court and a presidential election in U.S. history. (Note: Previously, the shortest time was on August 16, 1852, when Edward A. Bradford was nominated by the last Whig President Millard Fillmore, a period of 78 days before the November 2 election. The Democratic-controlled Senate adjourned two weeks later without taking any action, and his nomination lapsed.)

== Background ==
Under the Appointments Clause (Article II, Section 2) of the United States Constitution, judicial appointments are made by the president of the United States with the Advice and Consent of the United States Senate. Ginsburg was nominated to the Supreme Court by Bill Clinton on June 14, 1993, to fill the vacancy caused by the retirement of Byron White. The confirmation process was relatively short at six weeks, and she was approved by the Senate by a 96–3 vote on August 3, 1993. Ginsburg's tenure on the court led to her being described as one of the most important and iconic Supreme Court justices to liberals since Thurgood Marshall, and she was considered the left's counterbalance to Antonin Scalia on the right.

=== Death of Ruth Bader Ginsburg ===
Ginsburg was diagnosed with early-stage pancreatic cancer in 2009. Tumors were also found on her lungs when she sought medical care for broken ribs after a fall in late 2018. Ginsburg's declining health and advanced age raised the prospect of another possible vacancy and subsequent nomination during a presidential election year. On September 18, 2020, Ginsburg died at the age of 87, from complications of metastatic pancreatic cancer. Her death during a presidential election year left eight Supreme Court justices: three were nominated by Democratic presidents, and five by Republicans. Prior to her death, she dictated in a statement through her granddaughter Clara Spera that "my most fervent wish is that I will not be replaced until a new president is installed."

Ginsburg's death 46 days prior to the election was the second-closest of a Supreme Court justice to a presidential election in United States history; only Roger B. Taney's death in October 1864 was closer. (Note: In that case, Salmon P. Chase was nominated after the incumbent president, Abraham Lincoln, won re-election.) The latest successful Supreme Court confirmation in an election year before 2020 was when Benjamin Cardozo was nominated by Republican president Herbert Hoover on February 15, 1932. Cardozo was confirmed by the Republican-controlled Senate ten days later, on February 25, 1932.

== Nomination ==
=== Potential candidates ===
During his presidential candidacy in 2016, Trump released a list of jurists he would consider to fill a Supreme Court vacancy, including his first nominee, Neil Gorsuch. An updated short list was released in November 2017. Among the high-profile potential nominees from the list were Amy Coney Barrett, Britt Grant, Amul Thapar and David Stras, who were all elevated to the courts of appeals by President Trump. In September 2020, President Trump released another list of 20 possible appointees were a vacancy to arise, including Republican senators Tom Cotton (Arkansas), Ted Cruz (Texas), and Josh Hawley (Missouri); of the three senators, Cruz and Hawley later indicated they would decline a nomination.

On September 19, 2020, President Trump told supporters at a rally in Fayetteville, North Carolina, "I will be putting forth a nominee next week – it will be a woman". By September 21, Trump said that his list had been narrowed to just five names, with a final nomination to be made on September 24 or 25. As of September 2020, President Trump's complete list of Supreme Court candidates contained 44 names, of whom 12 were women. September 22 news reports identified Barrett, Barbara Lagoa, Joan Larsen, Allison Jones Rushing, and Kate Comerford Todd as the top contenders, with Barrett the frontrunner.

=== Rose Garden ceremony ===
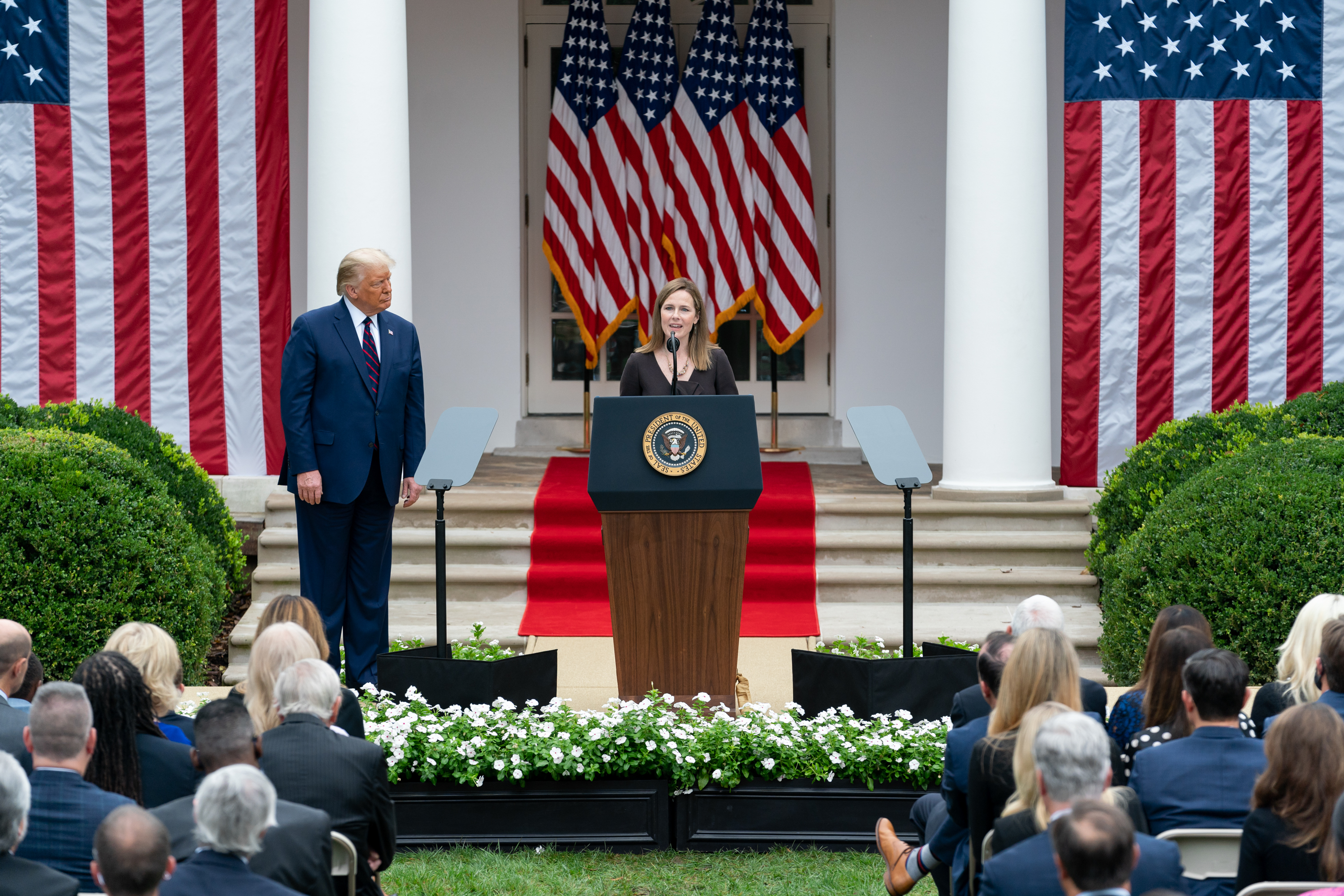
Amy Coney Barrett speaks in the Rose Garden after being officially nominated by President Trump, September 26, 2020

On September 26, Trump announced his nomination of Amy Coney Barrett in a ceremony in the White House Rose Garden before an audience of top Washington officials, other dignitaries, and family members. More than 150 people attended; they were told they did not need to wear masks if they had tested negative that day. Chairs for the outdoor ceremony were placed side by side, and there were two crowded indoor receptions. At least 18 attendees tested positive for the coronavirus in the following week: the president, the first lady, then-current Counselor to the President Hope Hicks, Senators Thom Tillis and Mike Lee, Notre Dame president John I. Jenkins, former Counselor to the President Kellyanne Conway, and former New Jersey Governor Chris Christie. Contact tracing expert Susie Welty said, "There's probably several super spreader events mixed up in this one scenario." Barrett was present at the event, but was reported to have tested positive for COVID-19 in the summer of 2020 and since recovered.

=== Amy Coney Barrett ===
Amy Coney Barrett is an American attorney, jurist, and academic who served as a circuit judge on the United States Court of Appeals for the Seventh Circuit. Before and while serving on the federal bench, she has been a professor of law at Notre Dame Law School, where she has taught civil procedure, constitutional law, and statutory interpretation. She is a textualist, a proponent of the idea that statutes should be interpreted literally, without considering the legislative history and underlying purpose of the law, and an originalist, a proponent of the idea that the Constitution should be interpreted as perceived at the time of enactment. She had been on Trump's list of potential Supreme Court nominees since soon after her 2017 Seventh Circuit bench confirmation hearing. While not a formal endorsement, the American Bar Association's Standing Committee on the Federal Judiciary rated Coney Barrett "Well Qualified" to serve on the Supreme Court, although a minority voted to rate her merely "qualified".

== Political responses ==
=== Republican Party ===
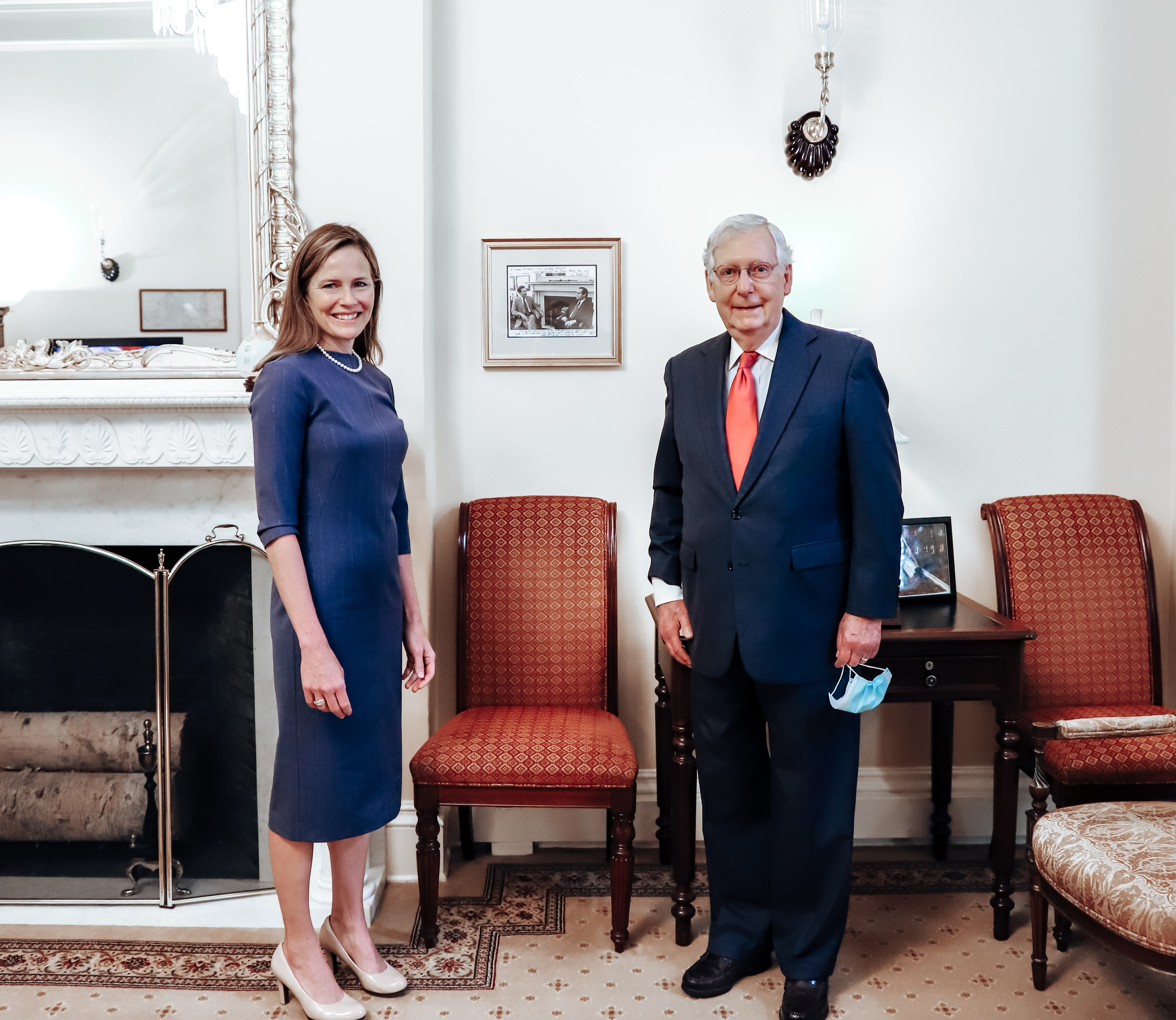
Barrett with then Senate Majority Leader Mitch McConnell, September 29, 2020

U.S. Senate Majority Leader Mitch McConnell vowed to bring a Trump nominee to replace Ginsburg to a confirmation vote in the Senate. He distinguished the refusal of the Senate to allow a vote for Garland by stating that the Republicans successfully retaining control of the Senate in the 2018 elections gave them a mandate to fill a vacancy that Obama, in his last year as a "lame-duck president", did not possess:

In the last midterm election before Justice Scalia's death in 2016, Americans elected a Republican Senate majority because we pledged to check and balance the last days of a lame-duck president's second term. We kept our promise. Since the 1880s, no Senate has confirmed an opposite-party president's Supreme Court nominee in a presidential election year. By contrast, Americans reelected our majority in 2016 and expanded it in 2018 because we pledged to work with President Trump and support his agenda, particularly his outstanding appointments to the federal judiciary. Once again, we will keep our promise.

— McConnell Statement on the Passing of Justice Ruth Bader Ginsburg, September 18, 2020

Two Republican senators, Susan Collins of Maine and Lisa Murkowski of Alaska, said the Senate should not vote on Barrett's nomination until after the presidential election. Collins said, "In fairness to the American people ... the decision on a lifetime appointment to the Supreme Court should be made by the President who is elected on November 3rd." Senator Mitt Romney said that in "the circumstance where a nominee of a president is from a different party than the Senate then, more often than not, the Senate does not confirm. So the Garland decision was consistent with that. On the other hand, when there's a nominee of a party that is in the same party as the Senate, then typically they do confirm." Trump said that the Republican Party has an "obligation" to replace Ginsburg as soon as possible, and that previous vacancies in an election year all resulted in a timely nomination by the incumbent.

Barrett with Republican senators, September 29–October 1, 2020

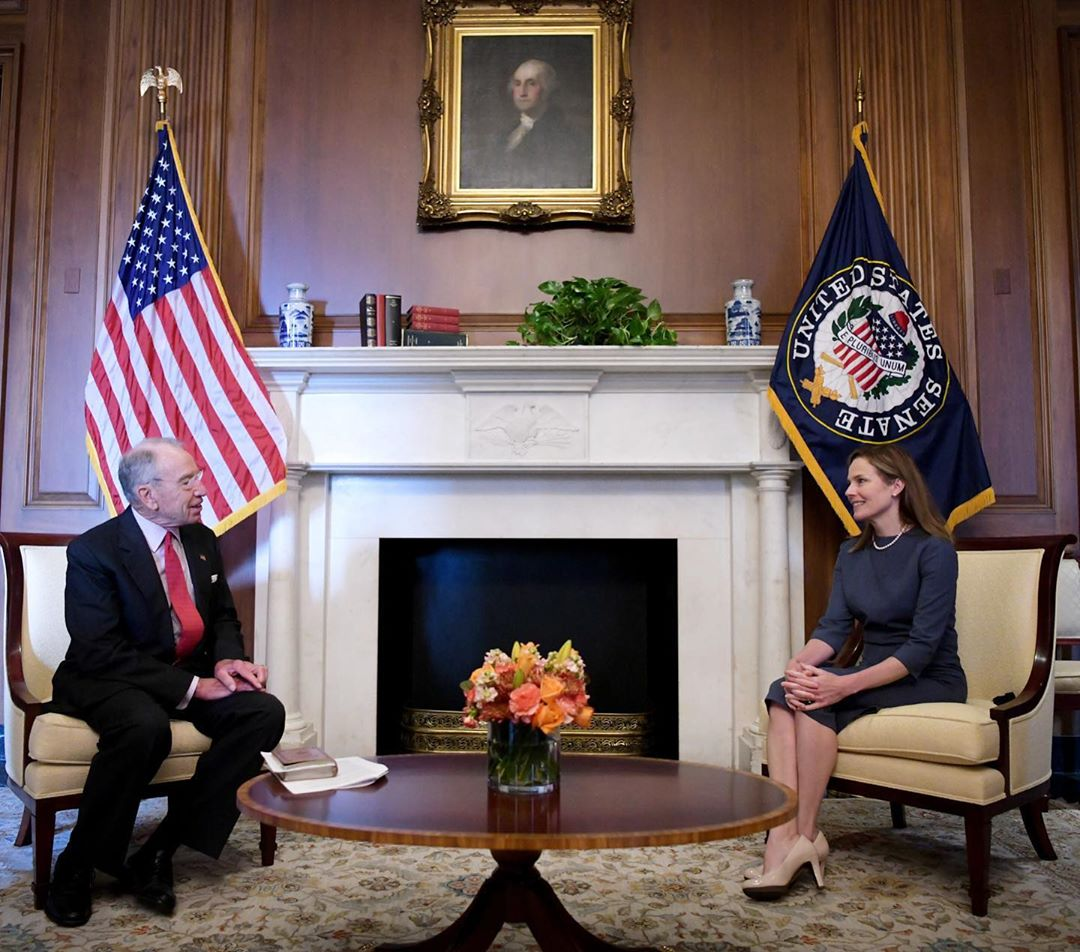
Barrett with former Senate Judiciary Committee Chairman Chuck Grassley, Iowa

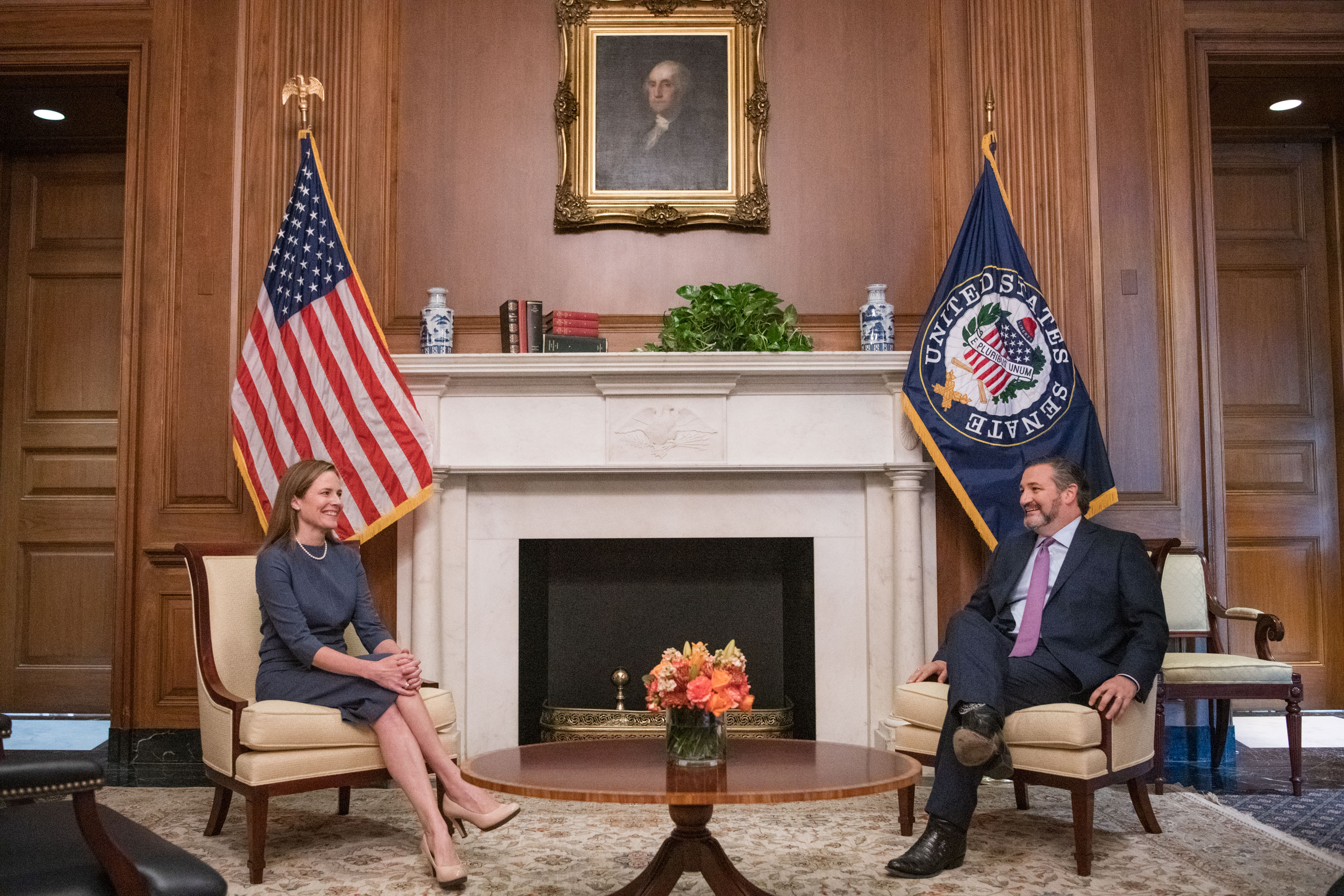
Barrett with Judiciary Committee member Ted Cruz, Texas

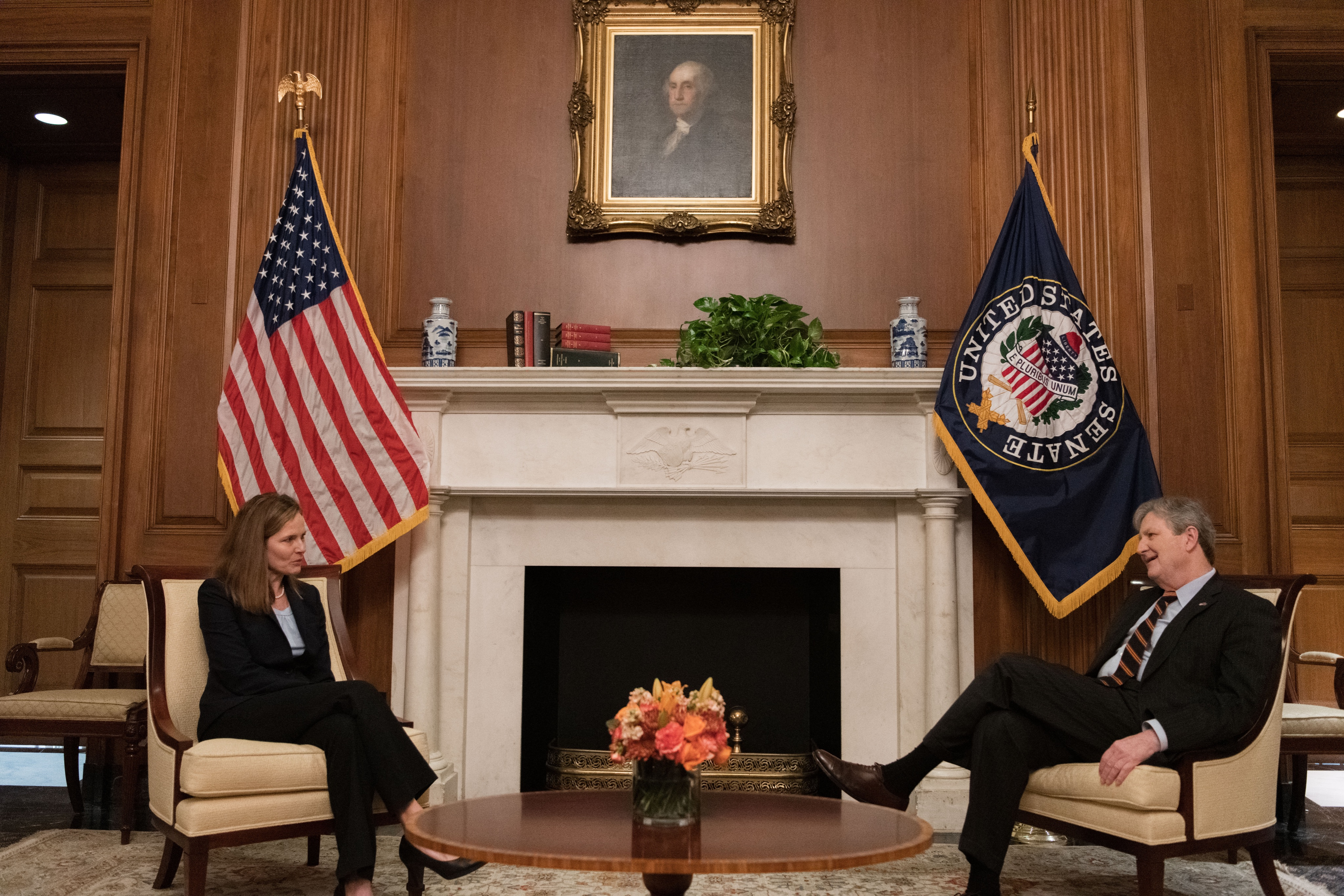
Barrett with Judiciary Committee member John Kennedy, Louisiana

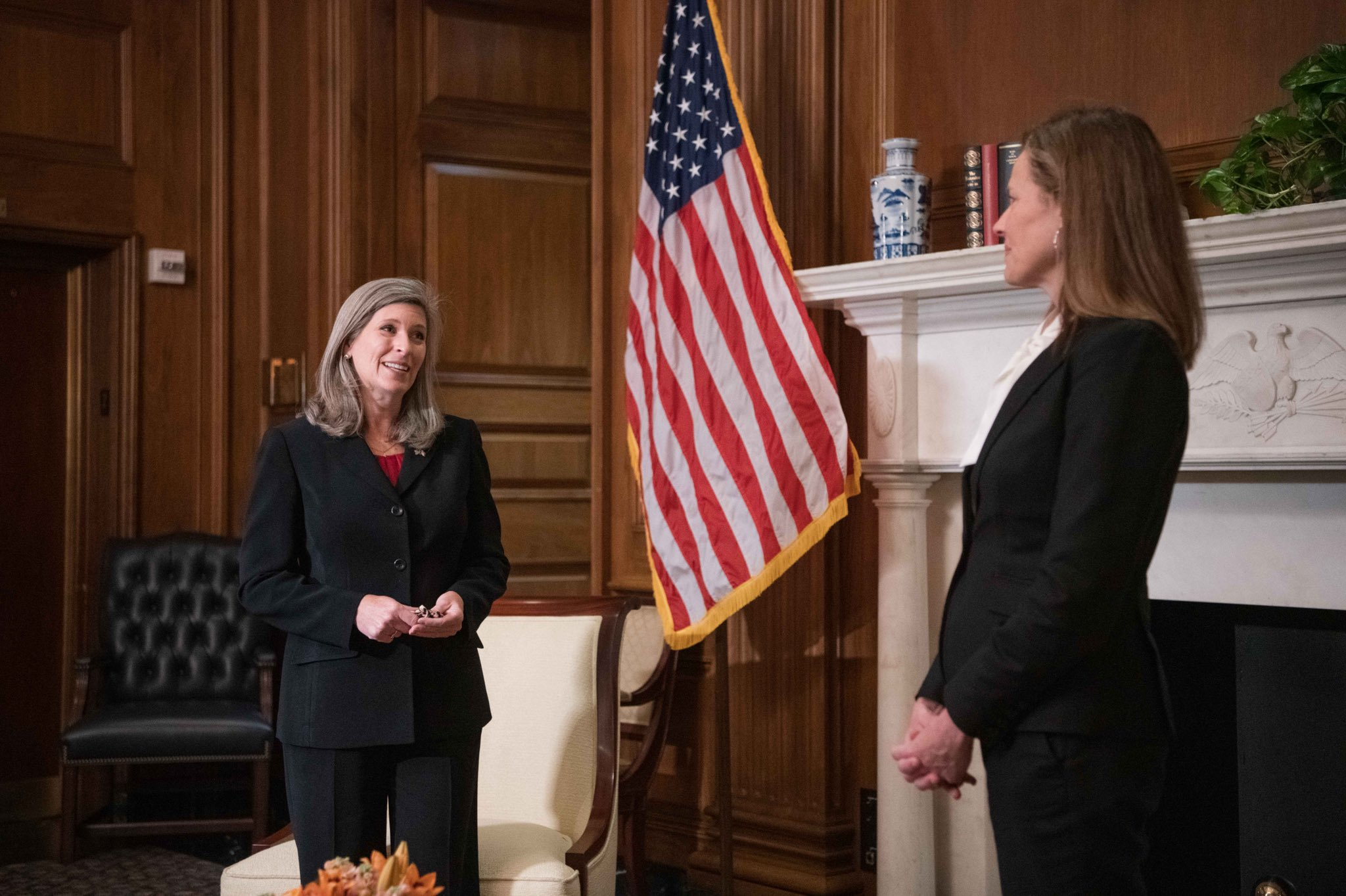
Barrett with Judiciary Committee member Joni Ernst, Iowa

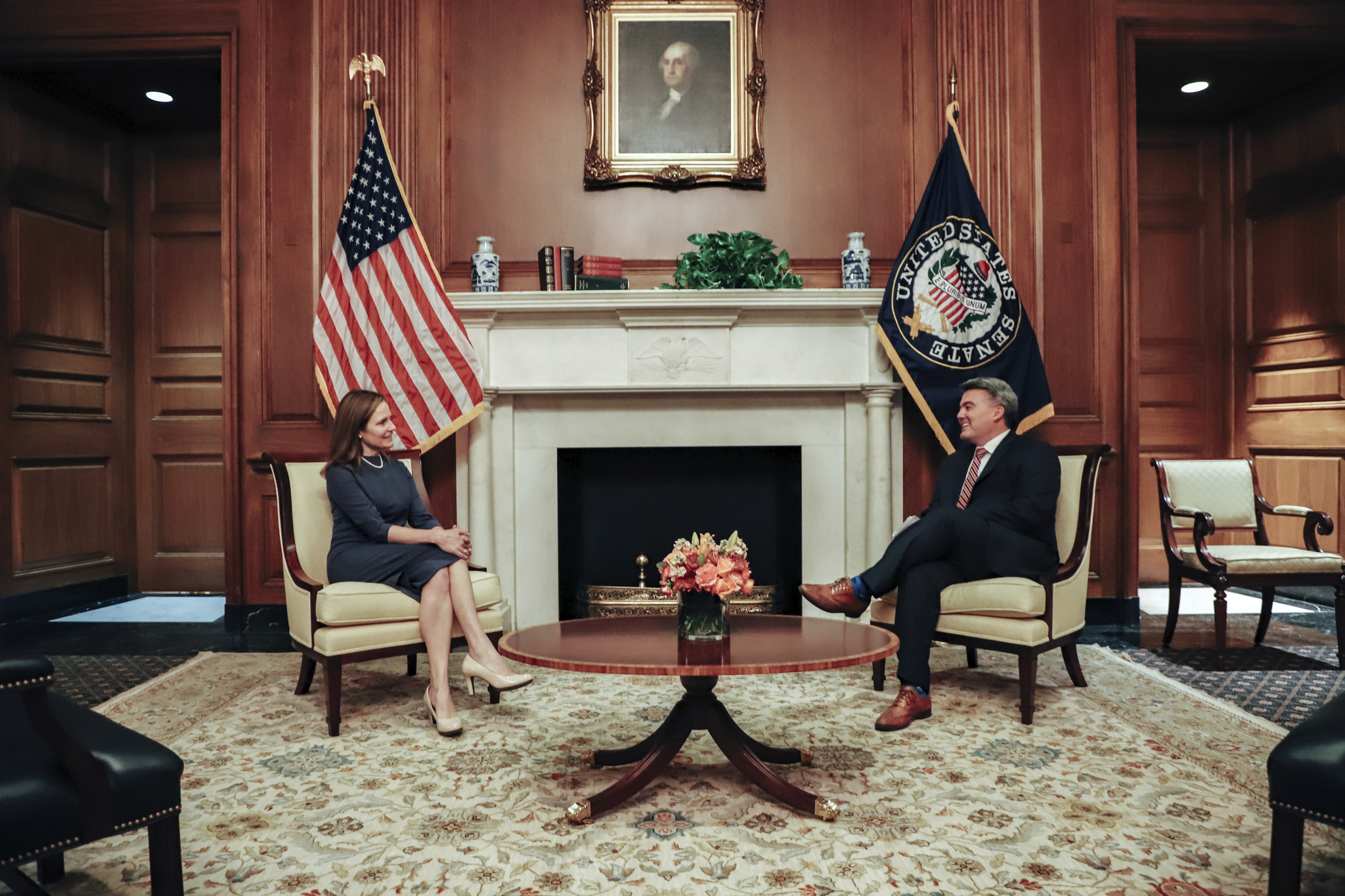
Barrett with Cory Gardner, Colorado

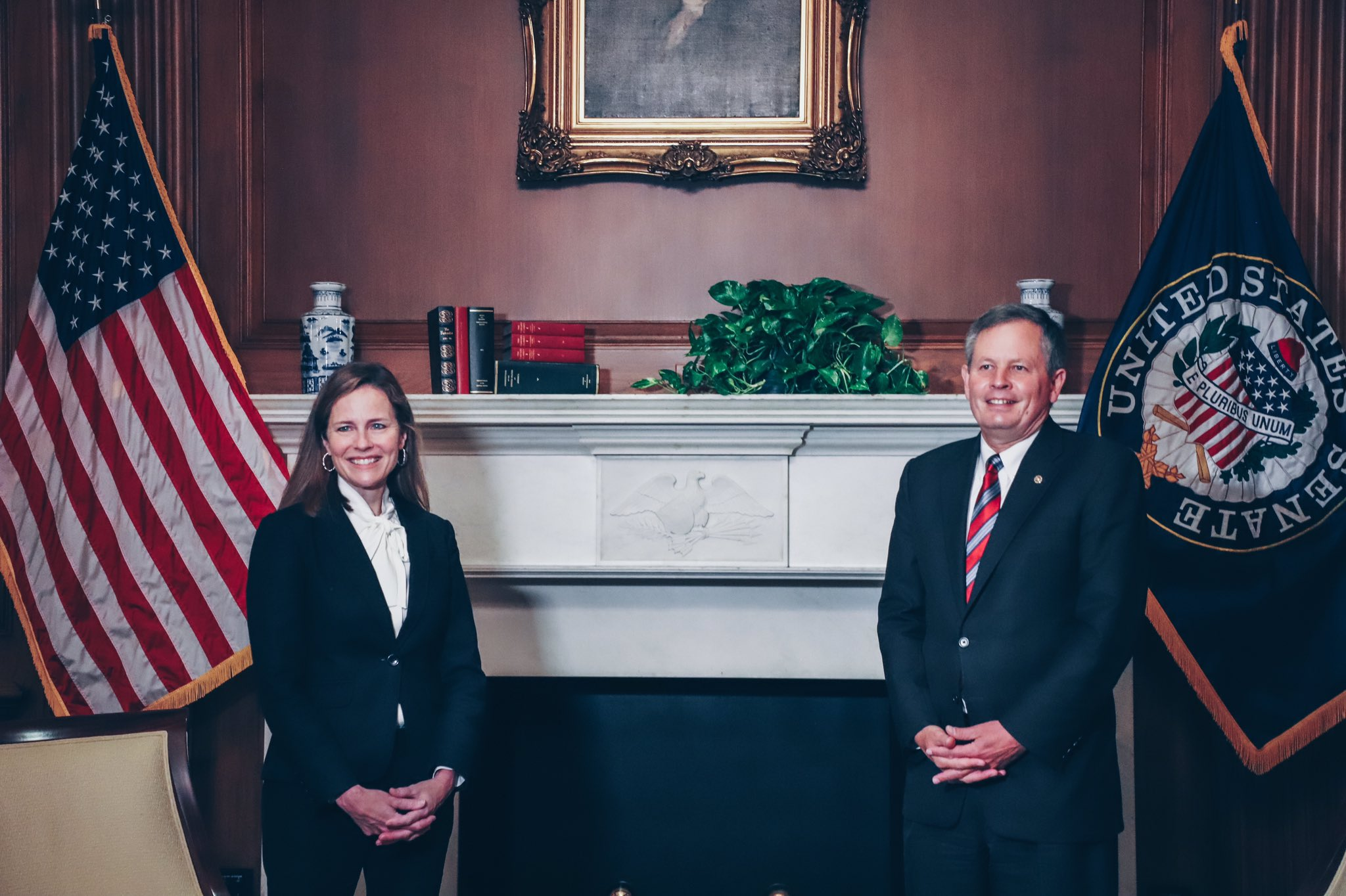
Barrett with Steve Daines, Montana

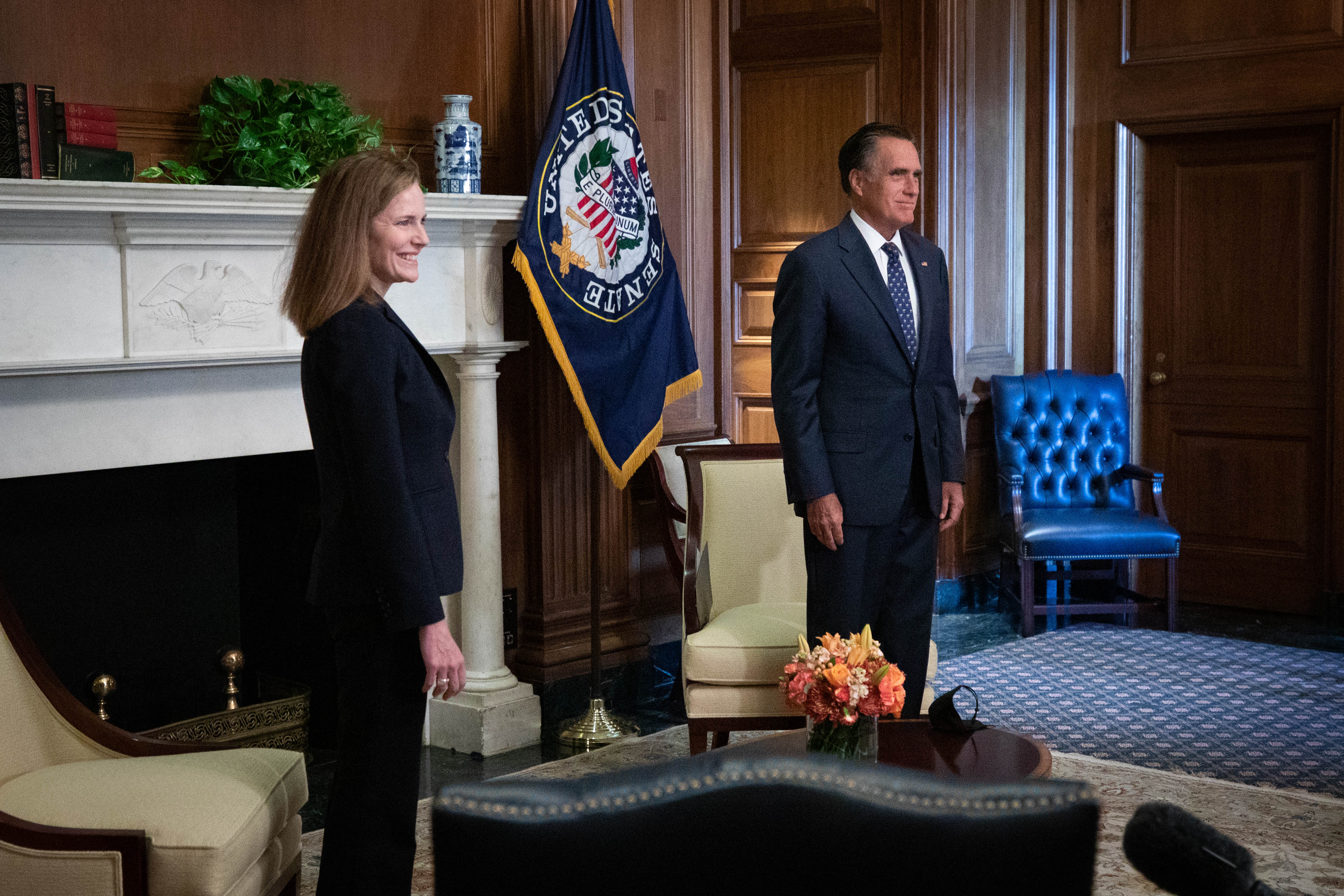
Barrett with Mitt Romney, Utah

=== Democratic Party ===
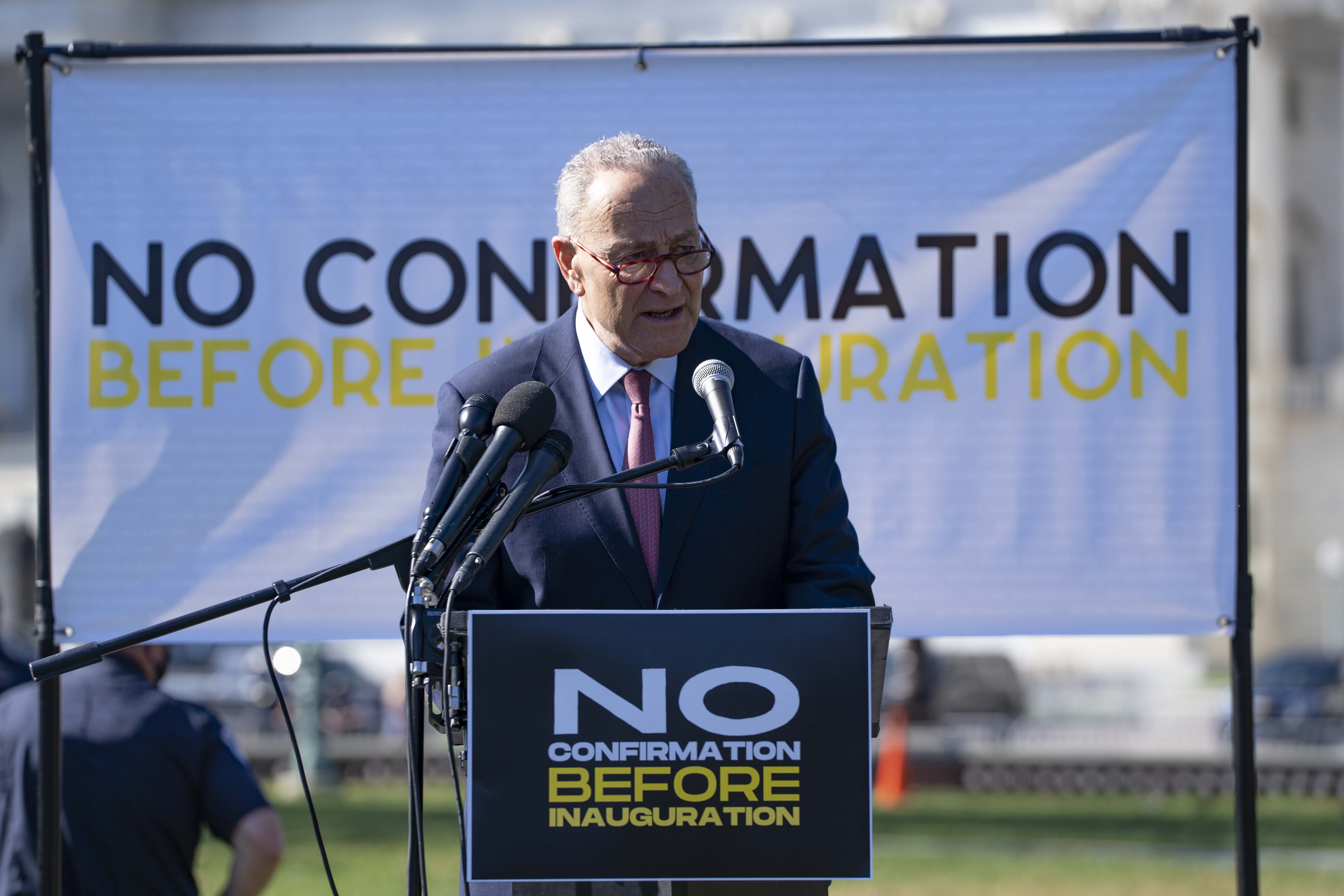
Senate Minority Leader Chuck Schumer speaks against Barrett's confirmation

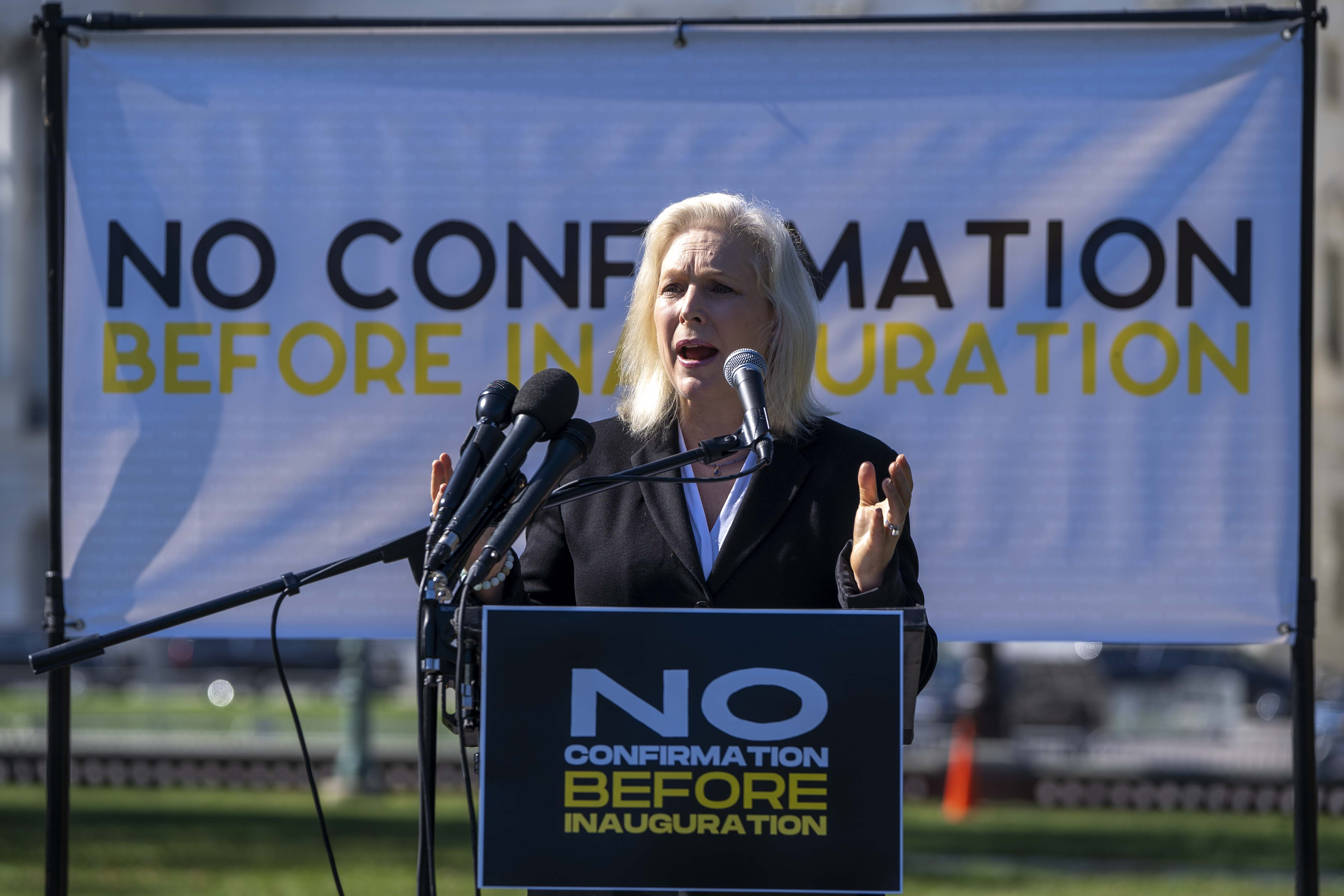
New York Senator Kirsten Gillibrand speaks against Barrett's confirmation

Immediately after Ginsburg's death was announced, Senate Minority Leader Chuck Schumer tweeted: "The American people should have a voice in the selection of their next Supreme Court Justice. Therefore, this vacancy should not be filled until we have a new president", echoing verbatim a quote McConnell made in 2016 regarding the vacancy left by Scalia's death. Massachusetts senator Ed Markey stated that, if McConnell violated the precedent set by the Garland nomination and held a confirmation vote, then Democrats should consider "expanding the Supreme Court"; the number of Justices has been set in law at nine since 1869, and since then only Franklin D. Roosevelt has made a serious attempt to increase the number of justices on the court (his "court-packing plan", intended to ensure that his New Deal economic reforms would be ruled constitutional).

In a conference call with the Senate Democratic Caucus on September 19, Schumer said that "nothing was off the table" if the Republicans began the process of filling the vacant seat and specifically mentioned an increase in court membership and complete abolition of the Senate filibuster. (Note: The Senate abolished the filibuster for executive appointments and lower-court judicial nominees in 2013 and for Supreme Court nominees in 2017.) After Barrett was nominated, Schumer announced his strong opposition, saying that she "seems to be intent on undoing all the things that Ginsburg did," that her confirmation would put at risk "just about everything that America believes in and stands for when it comes to issues like health care, labor rights and LGBTQ rights and women's rights," and that "A vote for Amy Coney Barrett is a dagger aimed at the heart of the health care protections Americans so desperately need and want". Schumer scoffed at Leader McConnell's assertion that such claims are "hysterical".

Schumer said he would not meet with Barrett, primarily because "the whole [nomination] process has been illegitimate." Additional Democratic party senators who have said that they would not meet with her include Jeff Merkley, Bob Casey Jr., Richard Blumenthal, and Mazie Hirono.

Schumer applied Senate rules that delay its business during the period of the confirmation, such as the "two-hour rule", under whose terms, no Senate committees or subcommittees (except those on Appropriations and Budget) can meet after the Senate has been in session for two hours or past 2:00 p.m. unless one of the following occurs: (1) the Senate grants unanimous consent for them to meet; (2) both the majority and minority leaders or designees agree to the meeting, and their agreement is announced on the Senate floor; or (3) the Senate adopts a privileged motion for the meeting. Should a committee meet during a restricted time period without such permission, any action that it takes—such as ordering a bill or nomination reported to the Senate—is "null, void, and of no effect." In response to the two-hour rule being invoked, a Senate committee could cancel its meeting or reschedule it to periods not covered by the rule—for example, in the morning before the Senate has convened or after it has adjourned. The Senate could also recess or adjourn in order for a committee to sit during the hours restricted by the two-hour rule, and in some cases it has done so in order for a committee to hear testimony or act on a measure or matter. Additional obstructionisms available include quorum busting (requiring a quorum call and then having all Democrats boycott, keeping the Senate from conducting business unless enough Republicans are present to establish a Senate "quorum", or majority of all senators); repeatedly raising points of order, which, when appealed, require roll call votes; and having the House of Representatives take up an action that the Senate must address immediately such as a War Powers Resolution. Dick Durbin, the second-ranking Senate Democrat, said that he would meet with Barrett. Durbin also said, "We can slow it down perhaps a matter of hours, maybe days at the most, but we can't stop the outcome."

Nancy Pelosi, the Speaker of the House of Representatives, said the House Democratic Caucus were also not ruling out any options other than a government shutdown after This Week host George Stephanopoulos asked her whether the House would impeach Trump or the Attorney General, William Barr, to delay confirmation hearings during the lame-duck session. (Note: Impeachment is a privileged process of Congress; a trial would take precedence over all other business, including any committee hearings or nomination debates.)

=== Public opinion ===
Polls prior to Ginsburg's death highlighted the high interest in the nomination of the next Supreme Court justice. A Fox News poll concluded in early September 2020 showing that 52% of likely voters trusted Biden in nominating the next justice, compared to 45% of respondents trusting Trump's choice. A Marquette Law School poll completed on September 15 had 59% of likely Biden voters rating the Supreme Court as "very important" in their presidential choice; 51% of likely Trump voters responding in kind. The same poll found that 67% of respondents believed that the Senate should hold confirmation hearings in 2020 for any vacancy, with little variation along party lines. Polls conducted by Siena on behalf of The New York Times in the Senate battlegrounds of Maine, North Carolina and Arizona and released on the day of Ginsburg's death indicated that voters prefer, 53% to 41%, that Biden must select the next justice.

After her death, a poll conducted by Ipsos on behalf of Reuters and released September 20 indicated that 62% of respondents agreed that the vacancy should not be filled until after the election, 23% disagreed, and 15% were unsure; approximately 80% of the Democrats and half of the Republicans polled opposed filling the vacancy. The Ipsos poll also found that potential impact on the election was uncertain: 30% of respondents said the vacancy increased the chances of them voting for Biden; 25% said it increased the chance of them voting for Trump; and 38% said it made no difference. Polls asking about the specific nominee tend to be more favorable than polls about President Trump filling the vacancy. A Morning Consult/Politico poll conducted from October 2–4 found 46% plurality support for confirming Judge Barrett as a Supreme Court Justice, with 31% opposed. By October 14, the same poll found support had grown to 48% among registered voters, with just 31% against her nomination entirely. By October 21, the same poll found that support for Barrett had grown to 51% among registered voters, with 28% opposed.

=== Senate caucus responses ===
Senate Republican Conference positions on voting to confirm Barrett's nomination
| Position | Count | Senators |
|---|---|---|
| Yes | 52 | List: Alexander (TN); Barrasso (WY); Blackburn (TN); Blunt (MO); Boozman (AR); Braun (IN); Burr (NC); Capito (WV); Cassidy (LA); Cornyn (TX); Cotton (AR); Cramer (ND); Crapo (ID); Cruz (TX); Daines (MT); Enzi (WY); Ernst (IA); Fischer (NE); Gardner (CO); Graham (SC); Grassley (IA); Hawley (MO); Hoeven (ND); Hyde-Smith (MS); Inhofe (OK); Johnson (WI); Kennedy (LA); Lankford (OK); Lee (UT); Loeffler (GA); McConnell (KY); McSally (AZ); Moran (KS); Murkowski (AK); Paul (KY); Perdue (GA); Portman (OH); Risch (ID); Roberts (KS); Romney (UT); Rounds (SD); Rubio (FL); Sasse (NE); Sullivan (AK); Scott (FL); Scott (SC); Shelby (AL); Thune (SD); Tillis (NC); Toomey (PA); Wicker (MS); Young (IN) |
| No | 1 | Collins (ME) |
Totals
| In Republican caucus | 53 senators | |
| In Democratic caucus | 47 senators | |
| Needed for confirmation | 51 Senate votes | |
Source: The Washington Post

The balance of power in the Senate was in favor of the Republicans, by 53 seats to 47, and Mike Pence, as the President of the Senate, would have held the casting vote in the event of a tie. Joe Manchin of West Virginia, the only Democrat to support Brett Kavanaugh's nomination in 2018, pledged to vote against Trump's nominee before the presidential election. Therefore, at least three or four Republican defections would have been needed to deny confirmation to a nominee.

Three Republican senators were believed to be possible swing votes against a Trump nomination or nominee: Susan Collins of Maine faced a difficult re-election campaign in part due to her vote to confirm Kavanaugh in 2018; Lisa Murkowski of Alaska was the only Republican senator to oppose Kavanaugh's nomination; and Mitt Romney of Utah was the only Republican senator to vote to convict Trump in his impeachment trial earlier in 2020. Chuck Grassley of Iowa and Lindsey Graham of South Carolina were also subjects of media interest due to statements both men made during the Kavanaugh confirmation regarding another election-year confirmation.

On September 20, Collins and Murkowski both reiterated their earlier comments that they opposed holding a vote this close to the election, but did not rule out voting to confirm during the lame-duck session. Murkowski, before the death of Ginsburg, had said that she would not vote to confirm a nominee ahead of inauguration day. A week later she said that she still would vote against holding a vote, but if one were to be held she might vote to confirm, the quality of the confirmation process being a factor. Murkowski, who voted against a motion on the Senate floor to proceed to executive session to consider the nomination, and also against the cloture motion to prevent a filibuster, announced on October 24 that she would vote to confirm Barrett. In a 2018 interview with The Atlantic, Graham stated that he would "wait 'til the next election" to confirm a justice if a vacancy arose in an election year. However, Graham committed to supporting a Trump nominee in 2020, claiming that the contentious circumstances of Kavanaugh's confirmation, together with the action of the Democrats in removing the power of the minority to block lower-court judicial nominees, had changed the rules. Grassley said that if he were still chairman of the Senate Judiciary Committee and this vacancy occurred, he would not have a hearing on it but that since he is no longer chairman and since the nomination is a matter for the Senate leadership, he will "evaluate the nominee on the merits" during the confirmation process. On September 22, Mitt Romney of Utah stated that he supported holding a vote on Trump's nominee to fill the vacancy without committing to vote for the nominee, saying he would vote "based upon their qualifications".

By September 21, Graham claimed that the Republicans had the votes to confirm a nominee both in committee and on the Senate floor, and McConnell claimed there was enough time for a confirmation prior to the election. 51 Republican senators supported giving Barrett a hearing, with only Collins and Murkowski in opposition. Following the White House COVID-19 outbreak, there was speculation that Republicans Thom Tillis and Mike Lee could become unable to attend Senate sessions or committee meetings, having tested positive for COVID-19, and therefore could potentially jeopardize Mitch McConnell's plan for a swift confirmation. Sen. Tom Cotton responded by saying that "there is a long and venerable tradition of ill or medically infirm senators being wheeled in to cast critical votes on the Senate floor." However, both Senators recovered and voted to confirm Barrett.

== Confirmation process ==
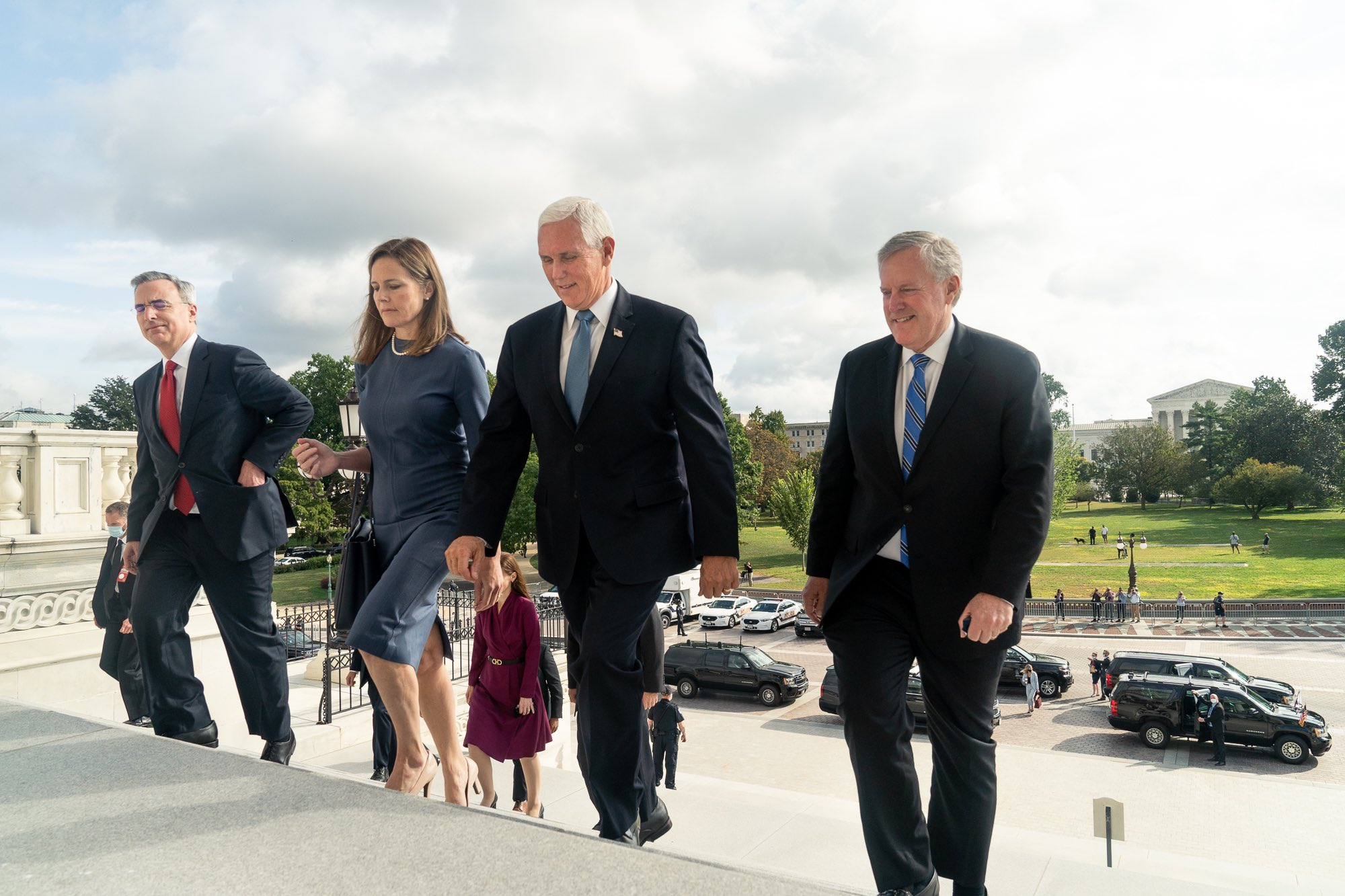
Amy Coney Barrett arrives at the U.S. Capitol with Vice President Mike Pence to begin meeting with Mitch McConnell prior to the start of her confirmation, September 29, 2020

Following Trump's formal nomination of Barrett, Senate Judiciary Committee Chairman Lindsey Graham announced that committee hearings on the nomination would begin October 12. Once the committee hearings begin, the minority members will have a procedural right to delay the hearing by an additional seven days. Graham said on Fox News that more than half of the Supreme Court justices who have had hearings were done within 16 days or less. "We'll have a day of introduction. We'll have two days of questioning, Tuesday and Wednesday, and on the 15th we'll begin to markup, we'll hold it over for a week, and we'll report her nomination out of the committee on October 22." "Then it will be up to (Senate Majority Leader Mitch) McConnell as to what to do with the nomination once it comes out of committee," he said. Barrett's answers to the Senate's questionnaire as a nominee to the Supreme Court has been made available by the Senate.

On October 3, Sen. McConnell said that, due to a coronavirus outbreak affecting the government, there would be no floor votes for two weeks. President Trump had been hospitalized with COVID-19 the previous evening, and three Republican senators had also been recently diagnosed: Thom Tillis, Mike Lee, and Ron Johnson. McConnell said that, on October 19, "we will need all Republican Senators back and healthy to ensure we have a quorum." However, the judiciary committee hearing was to proceed as scheduled with senators participating virtually as necessary. Sen. Johnson stated that even if he still tested positive at the confirmation vote for Coney Barrett, he would attempt to vote by wearing a "moon suit" in the Senate chamber.

=== Judiciary Committee review ===
On October 5, Sen. Graham formally scheduled the confirmation hearing, which began on October 12 as planned and was expected to last four days. Over the course of Tuesday and Wednesday, October 13–14, there were scheduled two rounds of questioning, with each of the 22 members of the Senate Judiciary Committee (12 Republicans and 10 Democrats) to have the chance to ask questions. Senators were scheduled to have 30 minutes each to question Barrett in the first round, with a second round lasting 20 minutes per senator. Barrett did not use notes during her questioning.

As the questioning began on October 13, Barrett was asked whether Roe v. Wade had been wrongly decided. She refused to answer, noting that there are ongoing cases related to abortion laws: "I can't pre-commit and say, 'yes, I'm going in with some agenda.'" Barrett added "I have no agenda." In refusing to discuss gay rights and the Constitution, Barrett invoked Ruth Bader Ginsburg. She said: "Justice Ginsburg with her characteristic pithiness used this to describe how a nominee should comport herself at a hearing. No hints, no previews, no forecasts. That had been the practice of nominees before her. But everybody calls it the Ginsburg rule because she stated it so concisely."

After the hearing was over, Barrett issued written responses to additional questions from senators.

==== Committee vote ====
The Senate Judiciary Committee met on Thursday, October 22, and voted to send the Barrett nomination to the Senate floor with a favorable recommendation. The committee vote was 12–0, with all 10 Democrats on the committee boycotting the vote. After the vote, the clerk announced, "Mr. Chairman, the votes are 12 yeas, 10 no votes," and Sen. Graham said, "The nomination will be reported favorably to the floor with a unanimous vote."

On the motion to report the nomination with a positive recommendation, the votes were as follows:

- Yea ▌ Republicans: Marsha Blackburn, John Cornyn, Mike Crapo, Ted Cruz, Joni Ernst, Lindsey Graham, Chuck Grassley, Josh Hawley, John Neely Kennedy, Mike Lee, Ben Sasse, and Thom Tillis.
- Nay (None)

Result: Yes, favorable recommendation

- Absent ▌ Democrats: Richard Blumenthal, Cory Booker, Chris Coons, Dick Durbin, Dianne Feinstein, Kamala Harris, Mazie Hirono, Amy Klobuchar, Patrick Leahy, and Sheldon Whitehouse.

Three types of quorum are applicable to the Senate Judiciary Committee. A quorum in order to discuss business is seven members. A quorum in order to transact business is nine members, two of whom must be minority members. A quorum in order to report measures or matters to the Senate is a majority of the committee. The relevant wording of the rule is: "Seven Members of the Committee, actually present, shall constitute a quorum for the purpose of discussing business. Nine Members of the Committee, including at least two Members of the minority, shall constitute a quorum for the purpose of transacting business. No bill, matter, or nomination shall be ordered reported from the Committee, however, unless a majority of the Committee is actually present at the time such action is taken and a majority of those present support the action taken." Taking a vote constitutes conducting business, and a quorum for conducting business (unlike a quorum to report measures to the Senate) requires two members of the minority, so this vote violated the rules of the committee. A point of order concerning the question of the establishment of a quorum in the committee was later raised on the Senate floor by Sen. Schumer, but it was voted down 53 to 44, with all Republicans—including Senators Collins and Murkowski—voting against it.

=== Floor debate and full Senate vote ===
On October 23, 2020, after a 53–43 vote to proceed to legislative session on the nomination, the Senate went into a rare, short closed session regarding the nomination, then voted 51–46 on a motion to proceed to executive session. There were a number of other procedural votes regarding tabling the nomination or recommitting it to the Judiciary committee raised by Senator Schumer. Also on October 23, Senator McConnell filed a cloture motion to end debate. An intervening day is required before a cloture vote can take place.

In 2017 the number of senators required to invoke cloture on Supreme Court nominations was reduced from 60 to a majority of senators voting. On October 25, 2020, cloture was invoked by a vote of 51–48. Republican Senators Lisa Murkowski and Susan Collins voted with the Democrats against the cloture motion. Subsequent debate on Supreme Court nominations is limited to 30 hours, which refers to actual floor time, not simply the passage of time. This time is split equally between Republicans and Democrats. If either side elected not to use all of its allotted time the debate would take less than 30 hours. Floor debate began October 25, and continued overnight. In the subsequent confirmation vote on the 26th, the Senate voted 52–48 in favor of confirming Amy Coney Barrett as an Associate Justice to the Supreme Court. Senator Collins was the only Republican to vote against the nominee, with all Democrats and both Independents voting against confirming her.

Vote to confirm the Barrett nomination
| October 26, 2020 | Party | | | Total votes |
| October 26, 2020 | Democratic | Republican | Independent | Total votes |
|---|---|---|---|---|
| Yea | 0 | 52 | 0 | 52 |
| Nay | 45 | 1 | 2 | 48 |
Result: Confirmed
Roll call vote on the nomination: Senator / Party / State / Vote; Lamar Alexander / R / Tennessee / Yea; Tammy Baldwin / D / Wisconsin / Nay; John Barrasso / R / Wyoming / Yea; Michael Bennet / D / Colorado / Nay; Marsha Blackburn / R / Tennessee / Yea; Richard Blumenthal / D / Connecticut / Nay; Roy Blunt / R / Missouri / Yea; Cory Booker / D / New Jersey / Nay; John Boozman / R / Arkansas / Yea; Mike Braun / R / Indiana / Yea; Sherrod Brown / D / Ohio / Nay; Richard Burr / R / North Carolina / Yea; Maria Cantwell / D / Washington / Nay; Shelley Moore Capito / R / West Virginia / Yea; Ben Cardin / D / Maryland / Nay; Tom Carper / D / Delaware / Nay; Bob Casey Jr. / D / Pennsylvania / Nay; Bill Cassidy / R / Louisiana / Yea; Susan Collins / R / Maine / Nay; Chris Coons / D / Delaware / Nay; John Cornyn / R / Texas / Yea; Catherine Cortez Masto / D / Nevada / Nay; Tom Cotton / R / Arkansas / Yea; Kevin Cramer / R / North Dakota / Yea; Mike Crapo / R / Idaho / Yea; Ted Cruz / R / Texas / Yea; Steve Daines / R / Montana / Yea; Tammy Duckworth / D / Illinois / Nay; Dick Durbin / D / Illinois / Nay; Mike Enzi / R / Wyoming / Yea; Joni Ernst / R / Iowa / Yea; Dianne Feinstein / D / California / Nay; Deb Fischer / R / Nebraska / Yea; Cory Gardner / R / Colorado / Yea; Kirsten Gillibrand / D / New York / Nay; Lindsey Graham / R / South Carolina / Yea; Chuck Grassley / R / Iowa / Yea; Kamala Harris / D / California / Nay; Maggie Hassan / D / New Hampshire / Nay; Josh Hawley / R / Missouri / Yea; Martin Heinrich / D / New Mexico / Nay; Mazie Hirono / D / Hawaii / Nay; John Hoeven / R / North Dakota / Yea; Cindy Hyde-Smith / R / Mississippi / Yea; Jim Inhofe / R / Oklahoma / Yea; Ron Johnson / R / Wisconsin / Yea; Doug Jones / D / Alabama / Nay; Tim Kaine / D / Virginia / Nay; John Neely Kennedy / R / Louisiana / Yea; Angus King / I / Maine / Nay; Amy Klobuchar / D / Minnesota / Nay; James Lankford / R / Oklahoma / Yea; Patrick Leahy / D / Vermont / Nay; Mike Lee / R / Utah / Yea; Kelly Loeffler / R / Georgia / Yea; Joe Manchin / D / West Virginia / Nay; Ed Markey / D / Massachusetts / Nay; Mitch McConnell / R / Kentucky / Yea; Martha McSally / R / Arizona / Yea; Bob Menendez / D / New Jersey / Nay; Jeff Merkley / D / Oregon / Nay; Jerry Moran / R / Kansas / Yea; Lisa Murkowski / R / Alaska / Yea; Chris Murphy / D / Connecticut / Nay; Patty Murray / D / Washington / Nay; Rand Paul / R / Kentucky / Yea; David Perdue / R / Georgia / Yea; Gary Peters / D / Michigan / Nay; Rob Portman / R / Ohio / Yea; Jack Reed / D / Rhode Island / Nay; Jim Risch / R / Idaho / Yea; Pat Roberts / R / Kansas / Yea; Mitt Romney / R / Utah / Yea; Jacky Rosen / D / Nevada / Nay; Mike Rounds / R / South Dakota / Yea; Marco Rubio / R / Florida / Yea; Bernie Sanders / I / Vermont / Nay; Ben Sasse / R / Nebraska / Yea; Brian Schatz / D / Hawaii / Nay; Chuck Schumer / D / New York / Nay; Rick Scott / R / Florida / Yea; Tim Scott / R / South Carolina / Yea; Jeanne Shaheen / D / New Hampshire / Nay; Richard Shelby / R / Alabama / Yea; Kyrsten Sinema / D / Arizona / Nay; Tina Smith / D / Minnesota / Nay; Debbie Stabenow / D / Michigan / Nay; Dan Sullivan / R / Alaska / Yea; Jon Tester / D / Montana / Nay; John Thune / R / South Dakota / Yea; Thom Tillis / R / North Carolina / Yea; Pat Toomey / R / Pennsylvania / Yea; Tom Udall / D / New Mexico / Nay; Chris Van Hollen / D / Maryland / Nay; Mark Warner / D / Virginia / Nay; Elizabeth Warren / D / Massachusetts / Nay; Sheldon Whitehouse / D / Rhode Island / Nay; Roger Wicker / R / Mississippi / Yea; Ron Wyden / D / Oregon / Nay; Todd Young / R / Indiana / Yea

== See also ==
- List of nominations to the Supreme Court of the United States
- Thurmond rule
- Presidential Commission on the Supreme Court of the United States
