= John D. Couriel =

American judge (born 1978)

John Couriel
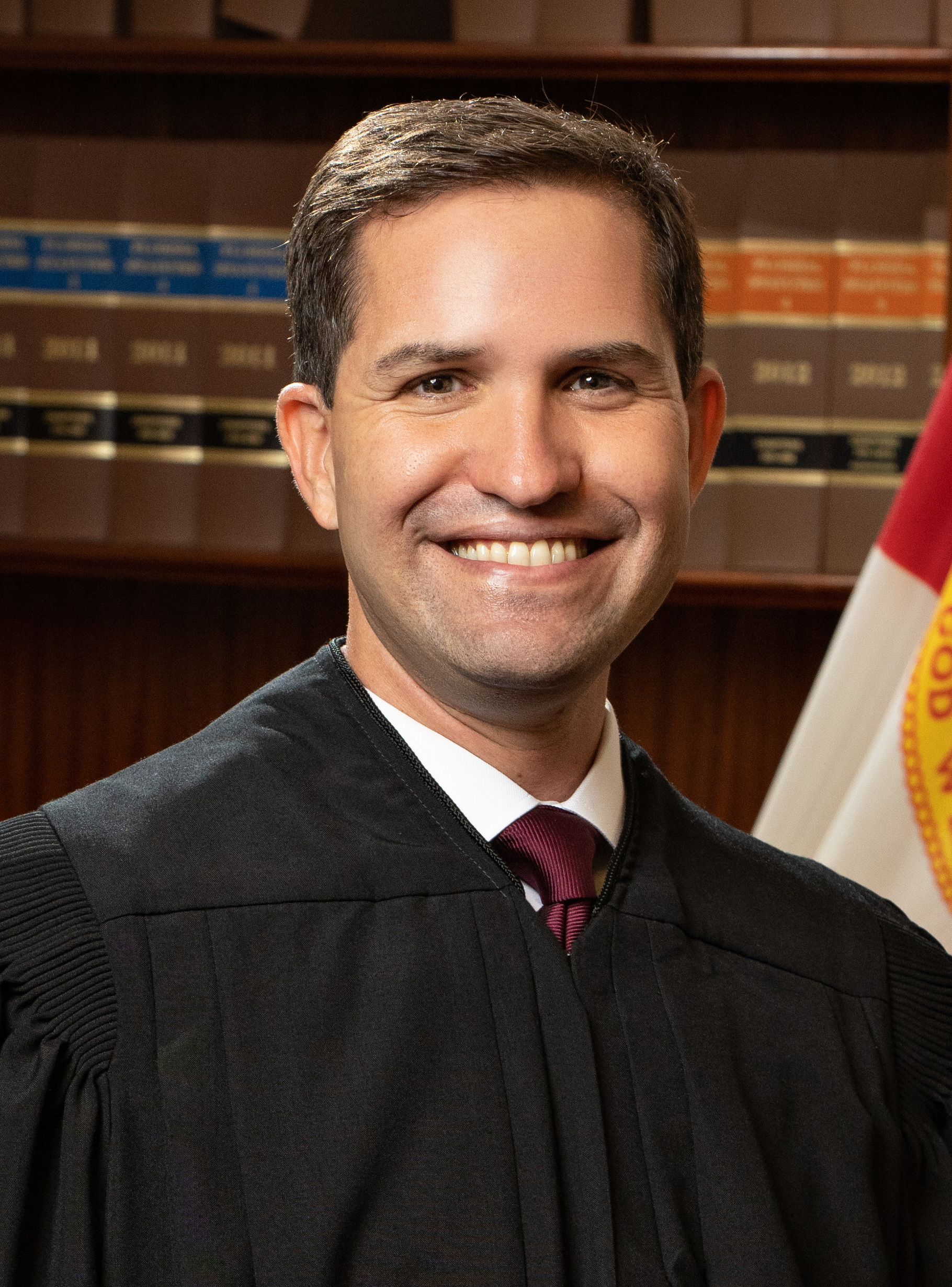

Chief Justice of the Florida Supreme Court
- Incumbent
- Assumed office July 1, 2026
- Preceded by: Carlos G. Muñiz

Justice of the Florida Supreme Court
- Incumbent
- Assumed office June 1, 2020
- Appointed by: Ron DeSantis
- Preceded by: Barbara Lagoa

Personal details
- Born: John Daniel Couriel; March 23, 1978 (age 48) Miami, Florida, U.S.
- Party: Republican
- Education: Harvard University (AB, JD)

John Daniel Couriel (born March 23, 1978) is an American lawyer and jurist. He was appointed to the Supreme Court of Florida by Governor Ron DeSantis on June 1, 2020. He is currently serving as the 58th chief justice of Florida since July 1, 2026.

== Early life and education ==
Couriel's parents emigrated from Cuba in the 1960s, with his father immigrating as part of Operation Pedro Pan. He grew up in Miami and graduated from Christopher Columbus High School in 1996. He earned the rank of Eagle Scout as a member of the South Florida Council of the Boy Scouts of America.

He received a Bachelor of Arts magna cum laude from Harvard College in 2000, and a Juris Doctor from Harvard Law School in 2003.

== Career ==
Couriel began his legal career as a law clerk to Judge John D. Bates of the United States District Court for the District of Columbia. Following his clerkship, Couriel went into private practice at Davis Polk & Wardwell in New York, focusing on mergers and acquisitions and bankruptcy. In 2009, he returned to Florida as an assistant United States attorney for the U.S. Southern District of Florida. In 2013, he joined Kobre & Kim in Miami as a partner, specializing in financial services and asset recovery, with an emphasis on representing Latin American clients.

Couriel unsuccessfully ran for the Florida Senate's 35th District in 2012 where he lost to incumbent Democrat Gwen Margolis 62-38%, and for the Florida House of Representatives' 114th District in 2016, where he lost to Democrat Daisy Baez 51-49%.

Couriel applied to become U.S. attorney for the Southern District of Florida in 2017, but President Donald Trump appointed Judge Ariana Fajardo Orshan. Sources claim Couriel had fallen out of favor for writing in former Florida Governor Jeb Bush instead of voting for Trump in the 2016 U.S. presidential election. Couriel had told the Los Angeles Times that "our Republican base hasn't known quite what to do with Donald Trump.”

== Florida Supreme Court ==
On May 26, 2020, Florida Governor Ron DeSantis appointed Couriel as the 90th justice of the Supreme Court of Florida, replacing Barbara Lagoa, who was appointed by President Trump to serve on the U.S. 11th Circuit Court of Appeals. Couriel's investiture ceremony did not occur until October 7, 2021, due to the COVID-19 pandemic. He was unanimously elected by his fellow justices as the 58th chief justice of the Supreme Court of Florida on April 16, 2026; he was sworn in on July 1, 2026.

Couriel has a conservative jurisprudence following textualism. He summarized his judicial approach at the 2025 Florida Bar Convention:

We’re always applying the tools of construction, we’re always looking at context as a determinative to meaning, and we don't turn to sources extraneous to text and context, we engage with the text, and context in history, to determine what the original public meaning of the statute was.

Couriel wrote the unanimous opinion in City of Tallahassee v. Florida Police Benevolent Association, Inc., holding that the victim confidentiality provision of the Florida Constitution does not guarantee a generalized right of anonymity to crime victims or preclude the city from disclosing officers' names and identities to the media.

While serving as a judge, Couriel joined a national panel to review law school accreditation in March 2026. Couriel's appointment followed a January 2026 decision of the Florida Supreme Court to remove the American Bar Association as Florida's sole law school accrediting body.

== Awards and honors ==
Couriel was honored with the Outstanding Eagle Scout Award in 2021 by the National Eagle Scout Association.

== Personal life ==
Couriel is married to his wife, Rebecca L. Toonkel, M.D., and they have two children.

Couriel is a native speaker of Spanish.

== See also ==
- List of Hispanic and Latino American jurists

Legal offices
Preceded by Barbara Lagoa	Justice of the Florida Supreme Court; 2020–present	Incumbent
Preceded by Carlos G. Muñiz	Chief Justice of the Florida Supreme Court; 2026–present	Incumbent
