= Donald Trump Supreme Court candidates =

Persons nominated or considered for nomination

With the advice and consent of the United States Senate, the President of the United States appoints the members of the Supreme Court of the United States, which is the highest court of the federal judiciary of the United States. Following his victory in the 2016 presidential election, Republican Donald Trump took office as president on January 20, 2017 and faced an immediate vacancy on the Supreme Court due to the February 2016 death of Associate Justice Antonin Scalia as well as the Republican-controlled Senate's months-long refusal to consider the Democratic previous President Barack Obama's nomination of United States Court of Appeals for the District of Columbia Circuit Chief Judge Merrick Garland to replace Scalia.

During the 2016 campaign, Trump had released two lists of potential nominees to the Supreme Court. After taking office, he nominated United States Court of Appeals for the Tenth Circuit judge Neil Gorsuch to succeed Scalia, and Gorsuch was confirmed in April 2017. In November 2017, five more names were added to the previous lists of potential nominees. In June 2018, Associate Justice Anthony Kennedy announced his retirement, creating a second vacancy on the Supreme Court. In early July 2018, Trump nominated United States Court of Appeals for the District of Columbia Circuit judge Brett Kavanaugh as his replacement; Kavanaugh was confirmed on October 6, 2018. Following the death of Associate Justice Ruth Bader Ginsburg on September 18, 2020, Trump nominated United States Court of Appeals for the Seventh Circuit judge Amy Coney Barrett as her replacement on September 26, 2020. Exactly a month later on October 26, 2020, Barrett was confirmed by a vote of 52–48.

The Gorsuch, Kavanaugh and Barrett confirmations were enabled by a rule change made by Senate Republicans in 2017, which applied the 'nuclear option' to Supreme Court nominees and allowed nominations to be advanced by a simple majority vote rather than the historical norm of a three-fifths supermajority vote. Vice president of the Federalist Society and lawyer Leonard Leo played a crucial role in selecting Trump's appointees and helping them successfully navigate their Senate confirmation hearings.

Following Trump's reelection to a second, non-consecutive term in the 2024 presidential election and entering office with a solid Republican majority in the Senate, observers noted that he would likely have the opportunity to appoint several more justices. Speculation on potential outgoing justices who might be replaced centered on Samuel Alito and Clarence Thomas. Should Thomas and Alito leave the court and their successors be appointed by Trump, he would become the first president since Dwight D. Eisenhower to personally appoint a majority of the Supreme Court. However, with Democrats winning a majority in the Senate after the 2026 Midterm elections, it is likely that no Trump-proposed candidate will be confirmed.

== Court composition under Trump's first term ==
President Donald Trump began his four-year term in January 2017 with a vacancy to be filled as a result of the February 2016 death of Justice Antonin Scalia and the Republican-controlled Senate's months-long refusal to consider the Democratic previous President Barack Obama's nomination of United States Court of Appeals for the District of Columbia Circuit Chief Judge Merrick Garland to replace Scalia. As three of the Court's justices at the time—Ruth Bader Ginsburg (born 1933), Anthony Kennedy (born 1936) and Stephen Breyer (born 1938)—were aged 78 or older, speculation arose that additional vacancies could occur during Trump's term. Because Ginsburg and Breyer were part of the liberal wing of the court and Kennedy was a swing vote who often aligned with them on social issues, many top political analysts saw Trump's term as a chance for Republicans to reshape the court significantly towards a more conservative vision of the law. On June 27, 2018, this became a real possibility when Justice Kennedy officially announced his retirement. Following the death of Ginsburg on September 18, 2020, and the subsequent confirmation of Amy Coney Barrett on October 26, 2020, the Supreme Court had the following nine justices at the time of Trump's 2020 reelection loss:

Name	Appointed	Appointed by	Law school (JD or LLB)
John Roberts (Chief Justice)	2005	George W. Bush	Harvard University
Clarence Thomas	1991	George H. W. Bush	Yale University
Stephen Breyer	1994	Bill Clinton	Harvard University
Samuel Alito	2006	George W. Bush	Yale University
Sonia Sotomayor	2009	Barack Obama	Yale University
Elena Kagan	2010	Barack Obama	Harvard University
Neil Gorsuch	2017	Donald Trump	Harvard University
Brett Kavanaugh	2018	Donald Trump	Yale University
Amy Coney Barrett	2020	Donald Trump	University of Notre Dame

== Nomination of Neil Gorsuch ==
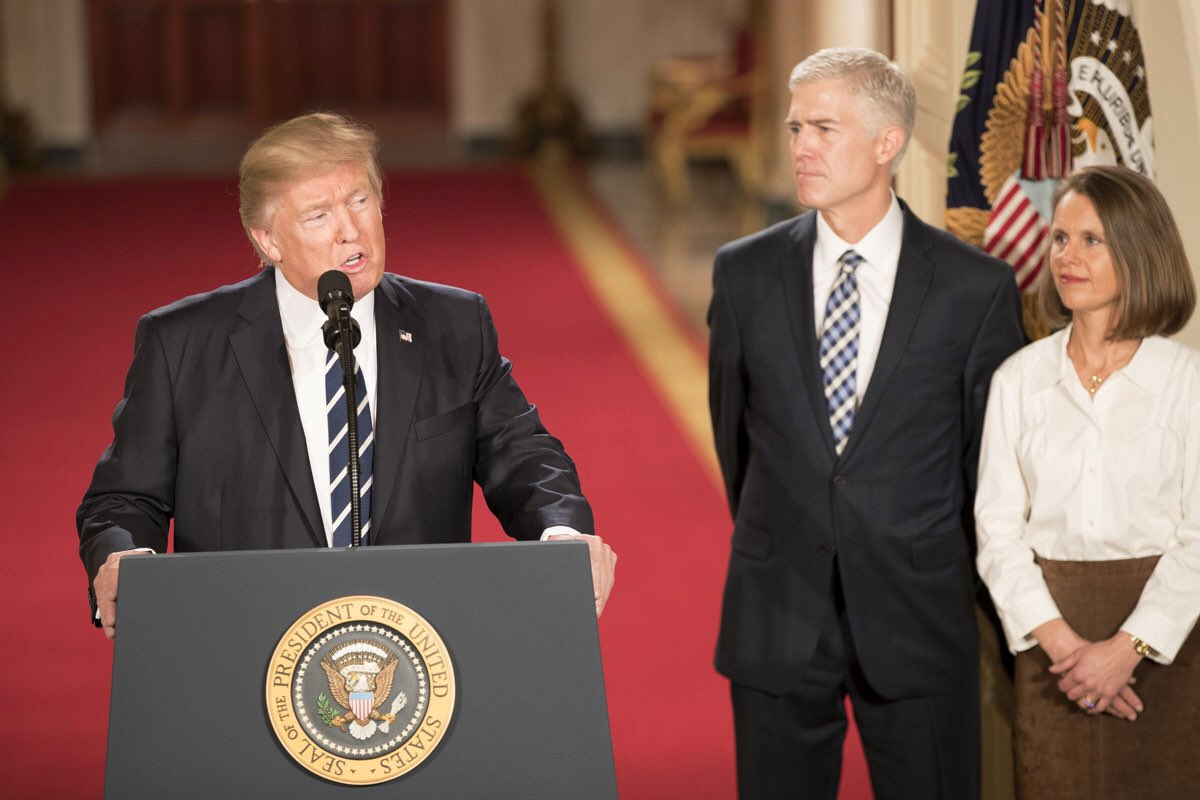
Judge Neil Gorsuch, his wife Louise, and President Donald Trump during the announcement in the East Room of the White House

On February 13, 2016, Associate Justice Antonin Scalia died while vacationing at Cibolo Creek Ranch near Marfa, Texas. Scalia's death marked just the second time in 60 years that a sitting Supreme Court justice died. This resulted in there being a Supreme Court vacancy during the last year of Barack Obama's presidency.

Mitch McConnell, the Republican Senate majority leader, stated that the new president, whoever won the 2016 election, should replace Scalia, while President Obama stated that he planned to nominate someone to replace Scalia on the Supreme Court. On February 23, the 11 Republican members of the Senate Judiciary Committee signed a letter to McConnell stating their intention to withhold consent on any nominee made by Obama, and that no hearings would occur until after January 20, 2017, when the new president took office. On March 16, 2016, Obama nominated then-chief judge Merrick Garland of the United States Court of Appeals for the District of Columbia Circuit to replace Scalia. After Garland's nomination, McConnell reiterated his position that the Senate would not consider any Supreme Court nomination until a new president took office. Garland's nomination expired on January 3, 2017 with the Senate having taken no action on it.

Trump rejected any move by Obama to fill the vacancy, maintaining that picking a successor to Scalia should be done by the next president. During his 2016 presidential campaign, Trump released two lists of potential Supreme Court nominees. On May 18, 2016, he released a short list of 11 judges for nomination to the Scalia vacancy. On September 23, 2016, he released a second list of 10 possible nominees, this time including three minorities. Both lists were assembled by lawyers associated with the Federalist Society and the Heritage Foundation.

Days after Trump's inauguration, Politico named three individuals as the front-runners for Scalia's position: United States Court of Appeals for the Tenth Circuit judge Neil Gorsuch, United States Court of Appeals for the Third Circuit judge Thomas Hardiman, and United States Court of Appeals for the Eleventh Circuit judge Bill Pryor, with Trump reportedly later narrowing his list down to Gorsuch and Hardiman. At the time of the nomination, Gorsuch, Hardiman, and Pryor were all federal appellate judges who had been appointed by President George W. Bush. President Trump and White House counsel Don McGahn interviewed those three individuals as well as Judge Amul Thapar of the U.S. District Court for Eastern District of Kentucky in the weeks before the nomination. Trump announced Gorsuch as his nominee on January 31. The Senate confirmed Gorsuch by a 54–45 vote on April 7, 2017, with votes from 51 Republicans and 3 Democrats. He was sworn into office as an associate justice of the Supreme Court on April 10.

== Nomination of Brett Kavanaugh ==
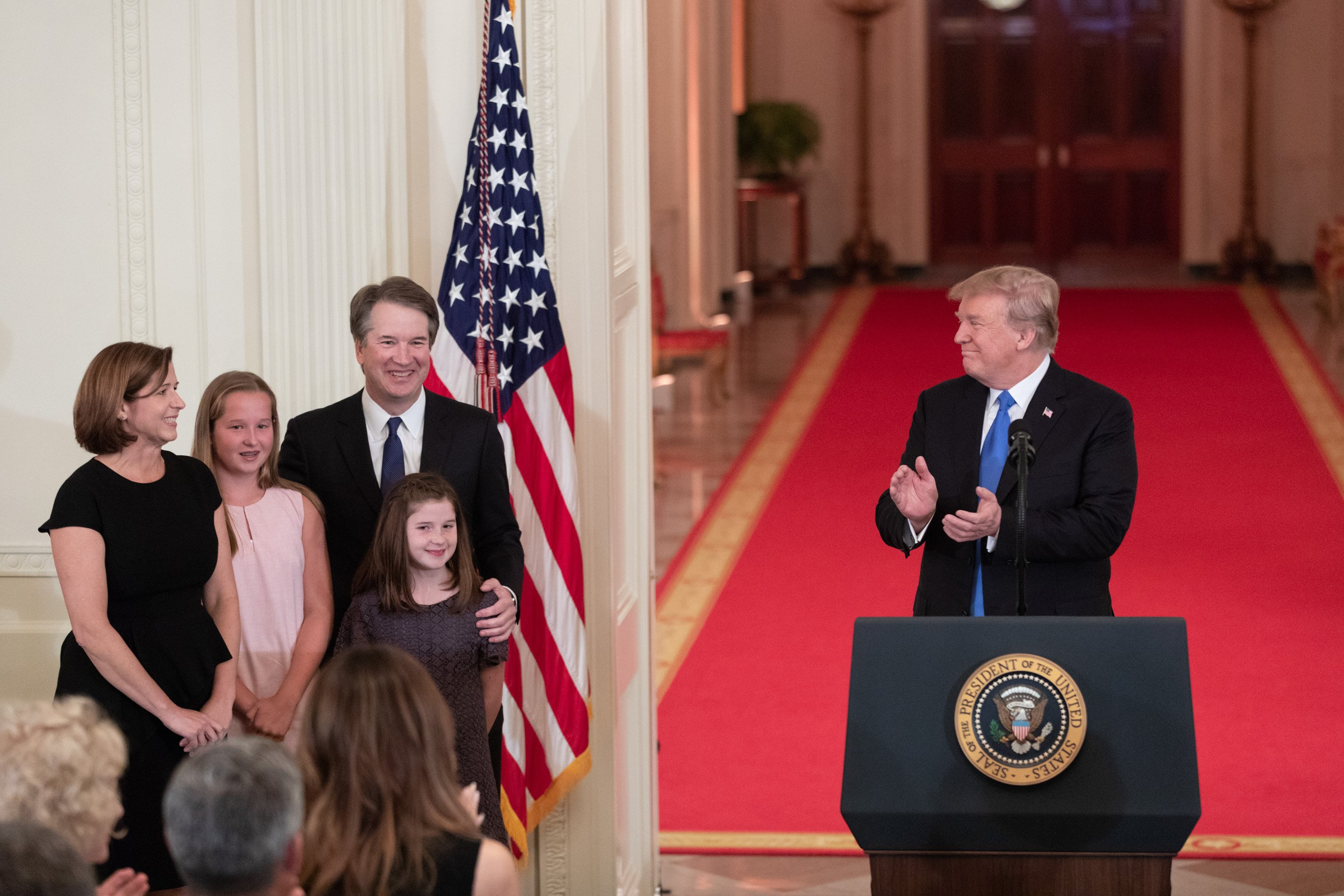
Judge Brett Kavanaugh and his family with President Donald Trump in 2018

On June 27, 2018, Justice Anthony Kennedy announced his retirement from the Supreme Court effective July 31, giving Trump an opportunity to send a second Supreme Court nominee to the Senate for confirmation. United States Court of Appeals for the District of Columbia Circuit judge Brett Kavanaugh was officially nominated on July 9, selected from among a list of 25 potential nominees considered by the Trump administration. Kavanaugh's nomination was officially sent to the Senate on July 10, 2018, and confirmation hearings began on September 4. The hearings took longer than initially expected over objections to the withholding of documents pertinent to Kavanaugh's time in the Bush administration as a lawyer and due to the presence of protestors.

On September 16, 2018, Christine Blasey Ford alleged that a then-17 year old Kavanaugh sexually assaulted her in 1982, in what she described as an attempted rape. The accusation delayed the scheduled September 20 vote. After Ford's accusation, Kavanaugh indicated he would not withdraw. Ford's allegations were followed by an accusation of sexual assault by Yale classmate Deborah Ramirez, and a letter from Julie Swetnick accusing Kavanaugh of gang rape in high school. Ford and Kavanaugh appeared before the Senate Judiciary Committee for a hearing on September 27, and were questioned by Arizona sex crimes prosecutor Rachel Mitchell and members of the Senate. The Judiciary Committee voted to approve Kavanaugh on September 28 after Jeff Flake, considered to be a swing vote, declared his intent to vote in favor of the nomination with the provision that there would be a new FBI investigation into the allegations by Ford. The investigation concluded on October 4. Two days later, Kavanaugh was confirmed by the whole Senate by a 50–48 vote, and sworn in that same day.

== Nomination of Amy Coney Barrett ==
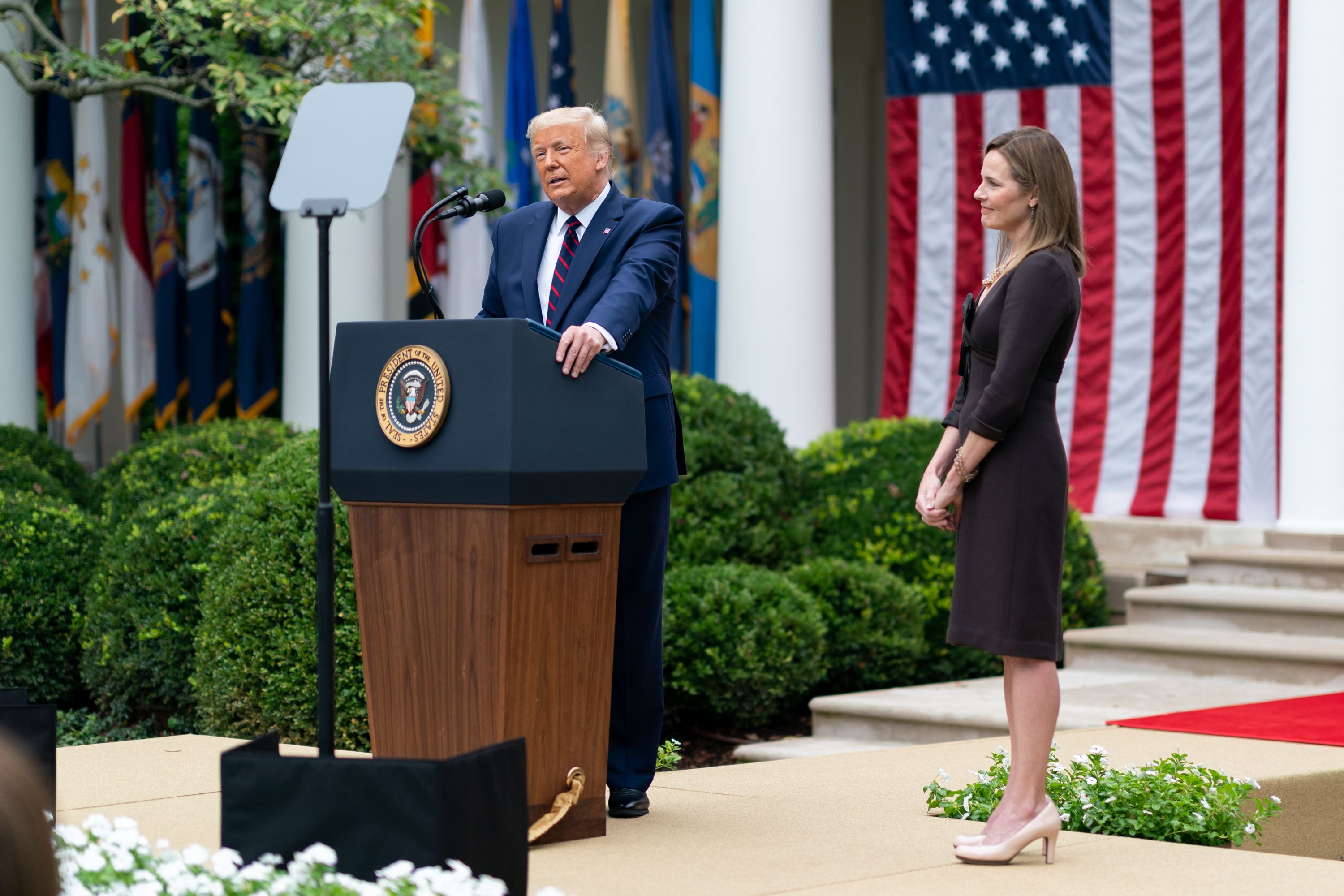
President Donald Trump nominates Judge Amy Coney Barrett in the Rose Garden of the White House.

Justice Ruth Bader Ginsburg died on September 18, 2020. The following day, Trump stated that any successor of Ginsburg would "most likely" be a woman. On September 25, 2020, it was announced that Trump would nominate United States Court of Appeals for the Seventh Circuit judge Amy Coney Barrett to succeed Ginsburg as Associate Justice of the Supreme Court of the United States. On October 26, 2020, Barrett was confirmed by a vote of 52–48. She was sworn in the next day.

== Possible nominees under the first Trump administration ==
Below is a list of individuals which President Trump identified as his potential nominees for Supreme Court appointments. Most of them were revealed in two lists released by the Trump campaign in 2016. Others were added in a revised list released by the White House on November 17, 2017 and a fourth list released on September 9, 2020.

Following the nomination of Amul Thapar to the Sixth Circuit, it was reported that Trump might try to season some of the candidates on his list with federal appellate court experience prior to potential nomination to the Supreme Court. Indeed, Trump later elevated a number of state court judges from his list to fill vacant positions on the federal Courts of Appeals: Joan Larsen (Sixth Circuit), David Stras (Eighth Circuit), Allison H. Eid (Tenth Circuit), Don Willett (Fifth Circuit), and Britt Grant (Eleventh Circuit). Conversely, two previous Trump appointees to the Courts of Appeals—Amy Coney Barrett (Seventh Circuit) and Kevin Newsom (Eleventh Circuit)—were later added to the list of potential Supreme Court candidates.

Despite speculation that Trump might consider other candidates for a possible second Supreme Court nomination, he said in May 2017 that he would make his next appointment from the same list he used to choose Gorsuch (the combined 21 names given on either of the two lists he released during the campaign), describing the list as "a big thing" for him and his supporters. Trump added five further candidates to the list on November 17, 2017.

Note:
Names marked with a single asterisk (*) were included on the original short list of eleven potential candidates for the Scalia vacancy released by the Trump campaign on May 18, 2016.
Names marked with a double asterisk (**) were included on the additional short list of ten more potential candidates released on September 23, 2016.
Names marked with a dagger (†) were added to the revised short list of November 17, 2017.
Names marked with a double dagger (‡) were included on the additional short list of twenty more potential candidates released on September 9, 2020.

Courts of Appeals

=== United States courts of appeals ===
- Court of Appeals for the D.C. Circuit
  - Gregory G. Katsas‡ (born 1964) (appointed by Trump)
  - Brett Kavanaugh† (born 1965) (nominated and confirmed)
- Court of Appeals for the 3rd Circuit
  - Thomas Hardiman* (born 1965)
  - Peter J. Phipps‡ (born 1973) (appointed by Trump)
- Court of Appeals for the 4th Circuit
  - Allison Jones Rushing‡ (born 1982) (appointed by Trump)
- Court of Appeals for the 5th Circuit
  - Kyle Duncan‡ (born 1972) (appointed by Trump)
  - James C. Ho‡ (born 1973) (appointed by Trump)
  - Don Willett* (born 1966) (appointed by Trump) (Note: Willett was originally placed on Trump's (first) short list for the Supreme Court as an associate justice of the Texas Supreme Court. After the nomination of Gorsuch to the Scalia vacancy, however, Trump nominated Willett to the Fifth Circuit Court of Appeals. Willett was confirmed on December 13, 2017, and this appointment is considered to enhance his potential for nomination to a future Supreme Court vacancy.)
- Court of Appeals for the 6th Circuit
  - Raymond Kethledge* (born 1966)
  - Joan Larsen* (born 1968) (appointed by Trump) (Note: Larsen was originally placed on Trump's (first) short list for the Supreme Court as an associate justice of the Michigan Supreme Court. After the nomination of Gorsuch to the Scalia vacancy, however, Trump nominated Larsen to the Sixth Circuit Court of Appeals. Larsen was confirmed on November 1, 2017, and this appointment is considered to enhance her potential for nomination to a future Supreme Court vacancy.)
  - Amul Thapar** (born 1969) (elevated by Trump) - see below regarding possible second term nominees (Note: Thapar was originally placed on Trump's (second) short list for the Supreme Court as a judge of the United States District Court for the Eastern District of Kentucky. After the nomination of Gorsuch to the Scalia vacancy, however, Trump nominated Thapar to the Sixth Circuit Court of Appeals. Thapar was confirmed on May 25, 2017, and this promotion is considered to enhance his potential for nomination to a future Supreme Court vacancy.)
- Court of Appeals for the 7th Circuit
  - Amy Coney Barrett† (born 1972) (appointed by Trump) (Note: Barrett was successfully nominated by Trump to the Seventh Circuit Court of Appeals and confirmed on October 31, 2017. She first appeared on Trump's revised short list for the Supreme Court in November 2017 after the Scalia vacancy had already been filled.) (nominated and confirmed)
  - Diane Sykes* (born 1957)
- Court of Appeals for the 8th Circuit
  - Steven Colloton* (born 1963)
  - Raymond Gruender* (born 1963)
  - David Stras* (born 1974) (appointed by Trump) (Note: Stras was originally placed on Trump's (first) short list for the Supreme Court as an associate justice of the Minnesota Supreme Court. After the nomination of Gorsuch to the Scalia vacancy, however, Trump nominated Stras to the Eighth Circuit Court of Appeals. Stras was confirmed on January 30, 2018, and this appointment is considered to enhance his potential for nomination to a future Supreme Court vacancy.)
- Court of Appeals for the 9th Circuit
  - Bridget S. Bade‡ (born 1965) (appointed by Trump)
  - Lawrence VanDyke‡ (born 1972) (appointed by Trump)
- Court of Appeals for the 10th Circuit
  - Allison Eid* (born 1965) (appointed by Trump) (Note: Eid was originally placed on Trump's (first) short list for the Supreme Court as an associate justice of the Colorado Supreme Court. After the nomination of Gorsuch to the Scalia vacancy, however, Trump nominated Eid to the Tenth Circuit Court of Appeals. Eid was confirmed on November 2, 2017, and this appointment is considered to enhance her potential for nomination to a future Supreme Court vacancy.)
  - Neil Gorsuch** (born 1967) (nominated and confirmed)
  - Timothy Tymkovich** (born 1956)
- Court of Appeals for the 11th Circuit
  - Britt Grant† (born 1978) (appointed by Trump) (Note: Grant first appeared on Trump's revised short list for the Supreme Court as an associate justice of the Georgia Supreme Court in November 2017 after the Scalia vacancy had already been filled. Trump subsequently nominated Grant to the Eleventh Circuit Court of Appeals. Grant was confirmed on July 31, 2018, and this appointment is considered to enhance her potential for nomination to a future Supreme Court vacancy.)
  - Barbara Lagoa‡ (born 1967) (appointed by Trump)
  - Kevin Newsom† (born 1972) (appointed by Trump) (Note: Newsom was successfully nominated by Trump to the Eleventh Circuit Court of Appeals and confirmed on August 1, 2017. He first appeared on Trump's revised short list for the Supreme Court in November 2017 after the Scalia vacancy had already been filled.)
  - Bill Pryor* (born 1962)
- Court of Appeals for the Armed Forces
  - Margaret A. Ryan** (born 1964)

=== United States district courts ===
- Federico A. Moreno** (born 1952) – senior judge, United States District Court for the Southern District of Florida
- Martha M. Pacold‡ (born 1979) – district judge, United States District Court for the Northern District of Illinois (appointed by Trump)
- Sarah Pitlyk‡ (born 1977) – district judge, United States District Court for the Eastern District of Missouri (appointed by Trump)
- Patrick Wyrick† (born 1981) – district judge, United States District Court for the Western District of Oklahoma (appointed by Trump) (Note: Wyrick was successfully nominated by Trump to the Western District of Oklahoma and confirmed on April 9, 2019. He first appeared on Trump's revised short list for the Supreme Court in November 2017 as an associate justice of the Oklahoma Supreme Court after the Scalia vacancy had already been filled.)

=== State supreme courts ===
- Keith R. Blackwell** (born 1975) – associate justice, Supreme Court of Georgia
- Charles Canady** (born 1954) – chief justice, Supreme Court of Florida
- Thomas Rex Lee* (born 1964) – associate justice, Utah Supreme Court
- Edward Mansfield** (born 1957) – associate justice, Iowa Supreme Court
- Carlos G. Muñiz‡ (born 1969) – associate justice, Supreme Court of Florida
- Robert P. Young Jr.** (born 1951) – former chief justice, Michigan Supreme Court

=== Executive branch ===
- Paul Clement‡ (born 1966) – former solicitor general of the United States
- Steven Engel‡ (born 1974) – United States assistant attorney general for the Office of Legal Counsel
- Noel Francisco‡ (born 1969) – former solicitor general of the United States
- Christopher Landau‡ (born 1963) – United States ambassador to Mexico
- Kate Comerford Todd‡ (born 1975) – Deputy Assistant to the President and Deputy Counsel to the President

=== United States senators ===
- Tom Cotton‡ (born 1977) – Senator from Arkansas
- Ted Cruz‡ (born 1970) – Senator from Texas
- Josh Hawley‡ (born 1979) – Senator from Missouri
- Mike Lee** (born 1971) – Senator from Utah

=== State executive branches ===
- Daniel Cameron‡ (born 1985) – former Attorney General of Kentucky

== Court composition under Trump's second term ==
In the intervening years between Trump's two presidencies, Justice Stephen Breyer retired, and was succeeded by Biden nominee Ketanji Brown Jackson. Upon the reelection of Trump, speculation of additional vacancies emerged, as three of the Court's justices—Clarence Thomas, Samuel Alito, and Sonia Sotomayor—were all in their seventies. In contrast to his first presidency, which created an ideological shift of the court, many analysts viewed a potential vacancy as a way to cement the court's conservative leanings.

Name	Appointed	Appointed by	Law school (JD or LLB)
John Roberts (Chief Justice)	2005	George W. Bush	Harvard University
Clarence Thomas	1991	George H. W. Bush	Yale University
Samuel Alito	2006	George W. Bush	Yale University
Sonia Sotomayor	2009	Barack Obama	Yale University
Elena Kagan	2010	Barack Obama	Harvard University
Neil Gorsuch	2017	Donald Trump	Harvard University
Brett Kavanaugh	2018	Donald Trump	Yale University
Amy Coney Barrett	2020	Donald Trump	University of Notre Dame
Ketanji Brown Jackson	2022	Joe Biden	Harvard University

== Possible nominees under the second Trump administration ==
Unlike the 2016 campaign, Trump did not release a list of potential Supreme Court nominees during the 2024 campaign. Names that have been suggested as likely nominees for Supreme Court seat in Trump's second term include a number of court of appeals judges, many of whom were appointed to their seats by Trump in his first term:

=== United States courts of appeals ===
- Court of Appeals for the D.C. Circuit
  - Neomi Rao (born 1973, appointed by Trump)
- Court of Appeals for the 2nd Circuit
  - Michael H. Park (born 1976, appointed by Trump)
  - Steven Menashi (born 1979, appointed by Trump)
- Court of Appeals for the 3rd Circuit
  - Emil Bove (born 1981, appointed by Trump)
- Court of Appeals for the 5th Circuit
  - James C. Ho (born 1973, appointed by Trump)
  - Kyle Duncan (born 1972, appointed by Trump)
  - Andrew Oldham (born 1978, appointed by Trump)
- Court of Appeals for the 6th Circuit
  - Raymond Kethledge (born in 1966, appointed by Bush)
  - Amul Thapar (born 1969, elevated by Trump)
- Court of Appeals for the 9th Circuit
  - Kenneth K. Lee (born 1975, appointed by Trump)
  - Patrick J. Bumatay (born 1978, appointed by Trump)
  - Lawrence VanDyke (born 1972, appointed by Trump)
- Court of Appeals for the 11th Circuit
  - Barbara Lagoa (born 1967, appointed by Trump)

=== United States district courts ===
- Aileen Cannon (born 1981) – Judge, United States District Court for the Southern District of Florida (appointed by Trump)
- Matthew Kacsmaryk (born 1977) – Judge, United States District Court for the Northern District of Texas (appointed by Trump)
- Kathryn Kimball Mizelle (born 1987) – Judge, United States District Court for the Middle District of Florida (appointed by Trump)

=== State supreme courts ===
- Mark D. Martin (born 1963) - Former chief justice, North Carolina Supreme Court

=== Executive branch ===
- Noel Francisco (born 1969) - 47th solicitor general
- D. John Sauer (born 1974) – Solicitor General of the United States

=== United States senators ===
- Ted Cruz (born 1970) – Senator from Texas
- Mike Lee (born 1971) – Senator from Utah

=== United States governors ===
- Ron DeSantis (born 1978) – Governor of Florida

=== State executive branches ===
- Jonathan F. Mitchell (born 1976) – 5th Texas solicitor general

=== Other backgrounds ===
- Morse Tan (born 1974) – Dean, Liberty University School of Law
- Kristen Waggoner (born 1972) – President, CEO, and General Counsel of Alliance Defending Freedom

== See also ==
- Judicial appointment history for United States federal courts
- List of federal judges appointed by Donald Trump
