= Carlos G. Muñiz =

American judge (born 1969)

Carlos Muñiz
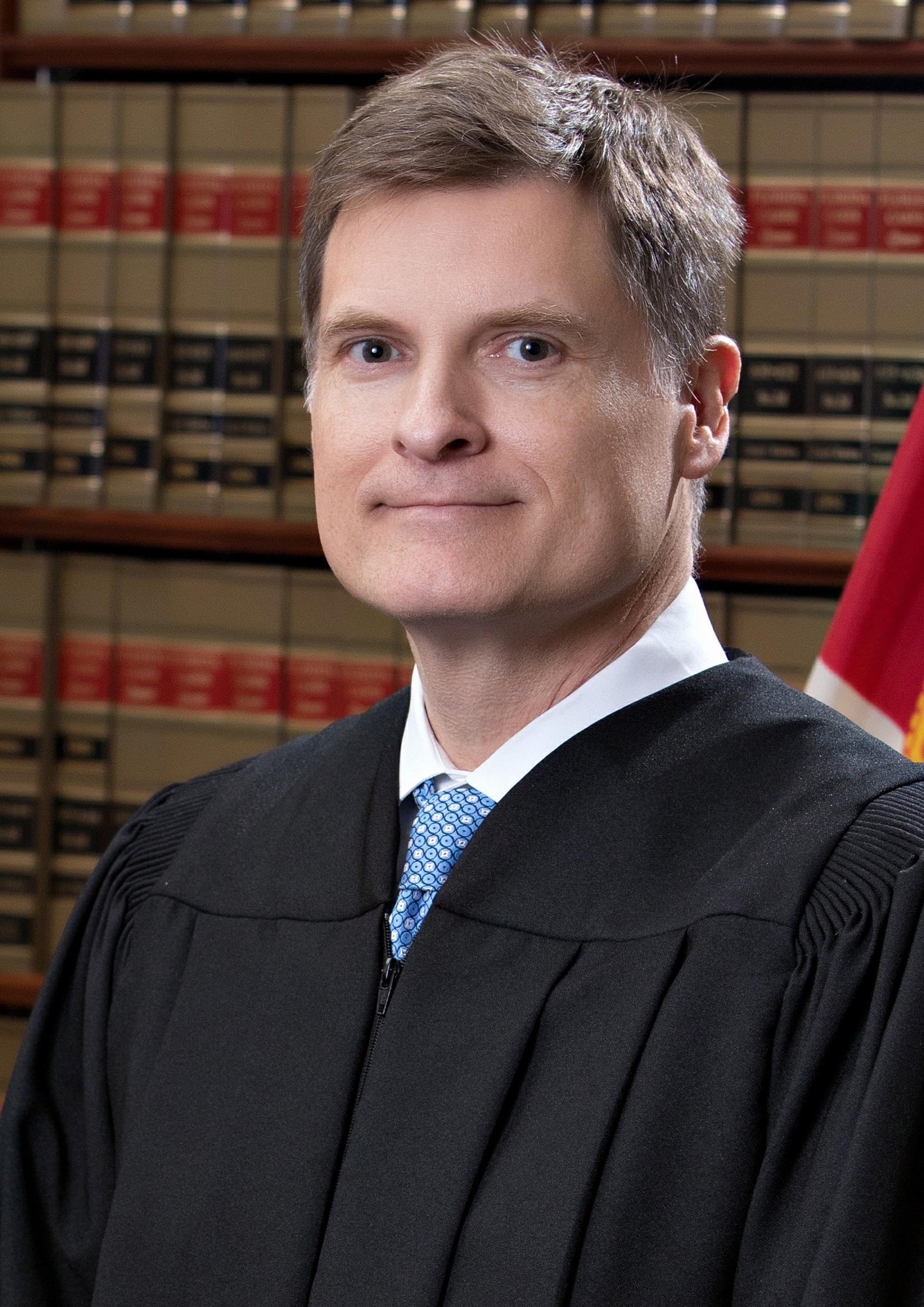
- Official portrait, 2019

Chief Justice of the Florida Supreme Court
- In office July 1, 2022 – July 1, 2026
- Preceded by: Charles Canady
- Succeeded by: John D. Couriel

Justice of the Florida Supreme Court
- Incumbent
- Assumed office January 22, 2019
- Appointed by: Ron DeSantis
- Preceded by: Peggy Quince

General Counsel of the United States Department of Education
- In office April 23, 2018 – January 22, 2019
- President: Donald Trump
- Preceded by: James Cole Jr.
- Succeeded by: Sandra Bruce

Personal details
- Born: Carlos Genaro Muñiz; June 25, 1969 (age 57) Chicago, Illinois, U.S.
- Party: Republican
- Spouse: Kathleen Baur Muñiz
- Children: 3
- Education: University of Virginia (BA); Yale University (JD)

Carlos Genaro Muñiz (born June 25, 1969) is an American lawyer and jurist. He served as General Counsel of the United States Department of Education in the first Trump administration. He was appointed to the Supreme Court of Florida by Governor Ron DeSantis on January 22, 2019. He served two terms as the 57th chief justice of Florida between 2022 and 2026.

== Early life and education ==
Muñiz graduated from Bishop Ireton High School in Alexandria, Virginia, in 1987 and received his Bachelor of Arts from the University of Virginia in 1991.

From 1991 to 1994, Muñiz was a civil rights analyst at the United States Department of Justice. He received a Juris Doctor from Yale Law School in 1997.

== Career ==
After graduating from law school, Muñiz clerked for Judge Thomas Aquinas Flannery of the United States District Court for the District of Columbia, from 1997 to 1998, and for Judge José A. Cabranes of the United States Court of Appeals for the Second Circuit, from 1998 to 1999. He then became an associate at Hogan & Hartson in Washington, D.C.

In January 2001, Muñiz moved to Florida to become deputy general counsel for Florida governor Jeb Bush. He left that position in June 2003, moving to the law firm of Gray Robinson. He rejoined the Bush administration in April 2005 as general counsel of the Florida Department of Financial Services, leaving that position in November 2006.

Beginning in December 2006, Muñiz was the policy director of the Republican Party of Florida; in July 2007, he became the deputy chief of staff and counsel in the office of the speaker of the Florida House of Representatives, leaving in October 2009. He was managing director at Bancroft Associates, in Washington, D.C., from October 2009 to April 2010, then returned to GrayRobinson.

In January 2011, Muñiz became deputy attorney general and chief of staff to Florida attorney general Pam Bondi. In 2013, he was involved in the discussions with Bondi that led her to take no action on consumer complaints against Trump University.

In January 2014, Muñiz left Bondi's office to join the firm of McGuireWoods, as a partner and lawyer in their Jacksonville office and as a senior vice president of the firm's consulting business in Tallahassee. At that firm, he represented Florida State University against a lawsuit brought by a student who accused quarterback Jameis Winston of raping her. The U.S. Department of Education's Office for Civil Rights investigated the case.

In March 2017, Muñiz was nominated by President Donald Trump to become the general counsel of the United States Department of Education. He became a senior advisor in the Office of Secretary of the department in February 2018, and was confirmed as general counsel by the U.S. Senate in April 2018, by a vote of 55–43.

On January 22, 2019, Governor Ron DeSantis appointed Muñiz to the Supreme Court of Florida.

On September 9, 2020, President Trump included him on a list of potential nominees to the Supreme Court.

== Publications ==
Muñiz has written two articles for the James Madison Institute: "Parental Notification of a Minor's Termination of Pregnancy" (published Fall 2004); and "It's Time to Fight Judicial Imperialism" (published August 17, 2005).

== Personal ==
Muñiz married his wife, Kathleen Baur Muñiz, in 2001. The couple has three children.

== See also ==
- Donald Trump Supreme Court candidates
- List of Hispanic and Latino American jurists

Legal offices
Preceded by Peggy Quince	Justice of the Florida Supreme Court; 2019–present	Incumbent
Preceded by Charles T. Canady	Chief Justice of the Florida Supreme Court; 2022–2026	Succeeded by John D. Couriel
