= Barbara Lagoa =

American judge (born 1967)

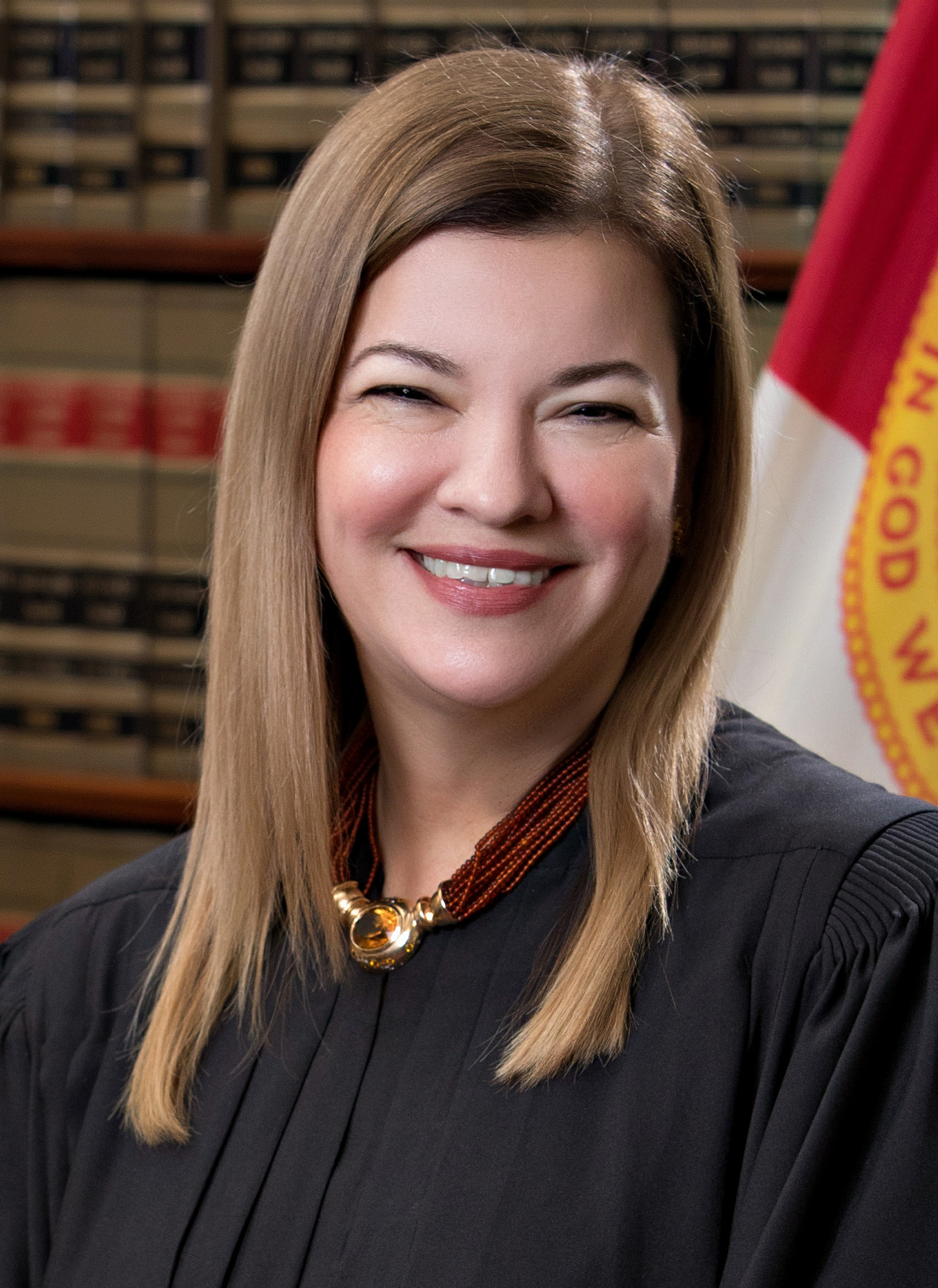
- Official portrait, 2019

Judge of the United States Court of Appeals for the Eleventh Circuit
- Incumbent
- Assumed office December 6, 2019
- Appointed by: Donald Trump
- Preceded by: Stanley Marcus

Justice of the Florida Supreme Court
- In office January 9, 2019 – December 6, 2019
- Appointed by: Ron DeSantis
- Preceded by: R. Fred Lewis
- Succeeded by: John D. Couriel

Chief Judge of the Florida Third District Court of Appeal
- In office January 1, 2019 – January 8, 2019
- Preceded by: Leslie Rothenberg
- Succeeded by: Kevin Emas

Judge of the Florida Third District Court of Appeal
- In office June 2006 – January 9, 2019
- Appointed by: Jeb Bush
- Preceded by: David Levy
- Succeeded by: Monica Gordo

Personal details
- Born: November 2, 1967 (age 58) Miami, Florida, U.S.
- Spouse: Paul Huck
- Children: 3
- Education: Florida International University (BA); Columbia University (JD)

Barbara Lagoa (born November 2, 1967) is an American attorney and jurist serving as a United States circuit judge of the United States Court of Appeals for the Eleventh Circuit. Prior to becoming a federal judge, she was the first Latina and Cuban American woman appointed to serve as a justice of the Supreme Court of Florida.

In 2020, Lagoa was a finalist to succeed Ruth Bader Ginsburg as an associate justice of the Supreme Court of the United States, which ultimately went to Amy Coney Barrett.

== Early life and education ==
Lagoa was born in Miami, Florida, in 1967. Her parents, Antonio and Araceli Lagoa, were Cuban immigrants who fled Cuba following the Cuban Revolution and the assumption of power by Fidel Castro. She grew up in the majority Cuban-American city of Hialeah, Florida. She is bilingual in English and Spanish.

Lagoa studied English literature at Florida International University, graduating in 1989 with a Bachelor of Arts cum laude and Phi Kappa Phi membership. She then attended Columbia Law School, where she was an associate editor of the Columbia Law Review. She graduated with a Juris Doctor in 1992.

== Career ==
=== Early career ===
After law school, Lagoa returned to Miami and entered private practice at the law firm Morgan, Lewis & Bockius. From 1998 to 2003, she was an associate at Greenberg Traurig. In 2000, Lagoa was one of a dozen lawyers who mostly pro bono represented the Miami family of Elián González. In 2003, Lagoa became an assistant United States attorney for the Southern District of Florida, working in the Civil, Major Crimes, and Appellate Sections.

=== Florida Supreme Court ===
Lagoa was appointed to the Third District Court of Appeal by Governor Jeb Bush in June 2006, and became chief judge on January 1, 2019. On January 9, 2019, she was appointed to the Supreme Court of Florida by Governor Ron DeSantis. She was the first Hispanic woman and the first Cuban-American woman to sit on the Florida Supreme Court. In April 2019, Lagoa wrote for the unanimous court when it found that DeSantis had acted within his authority by suspending Sheriff Scott Israel for his response to the Stoneman Douglas High School shooting.

In November 2019, Lagoa participated in oral arguments concerning an advisory opinion on whether the governor could require felons whom voters had re-enfranchised through 2018 Florida Amendment 4 to pay fines before being allowed to vote.

Lagoa resigned her position when she was appointed to the United States Court of Appeals for the Eleventh Circuit.

=== Federal judicial service ===
On September 12, 2019, President Donald Trump announced his intent to nominate Lagoa to a seat on the United States Court of Appeals for the Eleventh Circuit. She was nominated to the seat being vacated by Judge Stanley Marcus. On October 15, 2019, her nomination was sent to the Senate. On October 16, 2019, a hearing on her nomination was held before the Senate Judiciary Committee. On November 7, 2019, her nomination was reported out of committee by an 18–4 vote. On November 19, 2019, the Senate invoked cloture on her nomination by an 80–15 vote, and on November 20, 2019, her nomination was confirmed by an 80–15 vote. She received her judicial commission on December 6, 2019.

In July 2020, Democratic members of the Senate Judiciary Committee wrote directly to Lagoa to urge her to recuse herself from a challenge to felon disenfranchisement in Florida because of her earlier participation in a related matter on the Florida Supreme Court. Lagoa and her fellow Judge Robert Luck declined to recuse themselves: "An objective, disinterested lay person, knowing that we asked questions in a different proceeding (advisory vs. case-and-controversy), in a different court (Florida Supreme Court vs. federal court), with different issues (interpreting the state constitution vs. federal constitutional questions), and with different participants (“interested persons” vs. parties), would not reasonably entertain a significant doubt about our impartiality in this case." In September 2020, Lagoa joined the majority when the en banc circuit by a 6-4 vote upheld the constitutionality of the law that the Florida legislature had passed, which required re-enfranchised felons to pay all financial obligations, including fines, fees, and restitution before being allowed to vote. Lagoa joined Chief Judge William H. Pryor Jr.'s majority opinion, joined Pryor's additional concurrence, and authored her own concurrence.

In December 2022, Lagoa wrote the en banc court's majority opinion finding that a high school's bathroom policy, which separated bathrooms on the basis of biological sex, does not violate the Equal Protection Clause of the Fourteenth Amendment or Title IX. Lagoa separately wrote a special concurrence to "discuss the effect that a departure from a biological understanding of 'sex' under Title IX—i.e., equating 'sex' to 'gender identity' or 'transgender status'—would have on girls’ and women's rights and sports."

On August 21, 2023, Lagoa authored an opinion vacating a district court's preliminary injunction and allowing section 4(a)(1)-(3) of Alabama's Vulnerable Child Compassion and Protection Act to go into effect. Section 4(a)(1)-(3) makes it a crime in Alabama to "engage in or cause" the prescription or administration of puberty blockers or cross-sex hormones to individuals under the age of 19 "for the purpose of attempting to alter the appearance of or affirm the minor's perception of his or her gender or sex, if that appearance or perception is inconsistent with the minor's sex." In allowing the law to take effect, Lagoa found it unlikely that the Constitution protects an unenumerated right of parents to treat their children with transitioning medications. She also held that the law does not amount to sex discrimination.

==== Potential Supreme Court nomination ====
On September 9, 2020, Trump included Lagoa on a list of potential nominees to the United States Supreme Court. After the death of Ruth Bader Ginsburg on September 18, 2020, Lagoa was mentioned as one of several frontrunners to fill the vacancy created by Ginsburg's death.

The Washington Post reported that colleagues, friends, and scholars who have followed Lagoa's career describe her as "quiet and collegial, with shrewd political instincts." Her potential nomination to the United States Supreme Court was supported by a broad cross-section of Florida Republicans. Lagoa and her husband have built up "years of goodwill... in Florida's legal and political circles." Had she been successfully nominated, she would have been the first Supreme Court justice from Florida.

On September 26, 2020, President Trump nominated Amy Coney Barrett to the United States Supreme Court. Barrett was confirmed in October of that year.

== Personal life ==
Lagoa is married to lawyer Paul C. Huck Jr., and her father-in-law is United States District Judge Paul Huck, a Bill Clinton appointee. She and her husband have three daughters, including a set of twins.

Lagoa is a practicing Roman Catholic, and cites Catholic education as instilling "an abiding faith in God that has grounded me and sustained me through the highs and lows of life."

== See also ==
- Donald Trump Supreme Court candidates
- List of Hispanic and Latino American jurists
- List of first women lawyers and judges in Florida

Legal offices
Preceded by R. Fred Lewis	Justice of the Florida Supreme Court; 2019	Succeeded by John D. Couriel
Preceded by Stanley Marcus	Judge of the United States Court of Appeals for the Eleventh Circuit; 2019–present	Incumbent
