= Allison Jones Rushing =

American judge (born 1982)

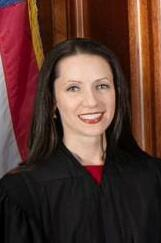
- Rushing in 2022

Judge of the United States Court of Appeals for the Fourth Circuit
- Incumbent
- Assumed office March 21, 2019
- Appointed by: Donald Trump
- Preceded by: Allyson K. Duncan

Personal details
- Born: Allison Blair Jones; April 23, 1982 (age 44) Hendersonville, North Carolina, U.S.
- Spouse: Blake Rushing (m. 2016)
- Education: Wake Forest University (BA); Duke University (JD)

Allison Jones Rushing (née Jones; born April 23, 1982) is an American attorney and jurist serving as a United States circuit judge of the United States Court of Appeals for the Fourth Circuit since 2019.

== Early life and education ==
Born in Hendersonville, North Carolina, Rushing graduated from East Henderson High School in East Flat Rock, North Carolina. Rushing studied music at Wake Forest University, graduating in 2004 with a Bachelor of Arts, summa cum laude, and was in Phi Beta Kappa. She then attended the Duke University School of Law, where she was an executive editor of the Duke Law Journal. She graduated in 2007 with a Juris Doctor, magna cum laude.

== Career ==
In 2005, Rushing was a law student intern at the Alliance Defending Freedom (ADF), a conservative Christian nonprofit organization. Rushing wrote or co-wrote several amicus briefs on behalf of ADF and spoke at a number of ADF events. In 2006, Rushing was a summer associate at Williams & Connolly, a Washington, D.C. law firm. In 2007, Rushing was a summer law clerk with the Department of Justice.

After graduating from law school, Rushing clerked for then-Judge Neil Gorsuch of the United States Court of Appeals for the Tenth Circuit from 2007 to 2008 and Judge David B. Sentelle of the United States Court of Appeals for the District of Columbia Circuit from 2008 to 2009. From 2009 to 2010, Rushing returned to Williams & Connolly as an associate. She clerked for Associate Justice Clarence Thomas of the Supreme Court of the United States during the 2010–2011 term.

Following the end of her clerkship in 2011, Rushing rejoined Williams & Connolly in its Washington, D.C. office under Kannon Shanmugam. Rushing became a member of the Federalist Society in 2012. She volunteered as a legal advisor to Mitt Romney's 2012 presidential campaign. Rushing was named partner at Williams & Connolly in January 2017. After being appointed to the Fourth Circuit, she left Williams & Connolly.

=== Federal judicial service ===
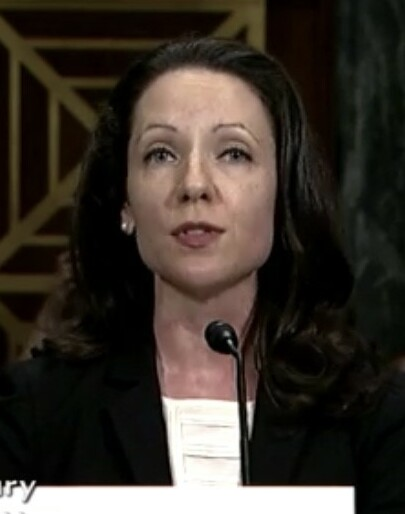
U.S. Senate Judiciary Committee hearing

On August 27, 2018, President Donald Trump announced his intent to nominate Rushing to serve as a United States Circuit Judge of the United States Court of Appeals for the Fourth Circuit. Her official nomination was received on the same day by the United States Senate. She was nominated to the seat being vacated by Allyson K. Duncan, who previously announced her intention to assume senior status upon the confirmation of her successor. On October 17, 2018, a hearing on her nomination was held before the Senate Judiciary Committee. During Rushing's confirmation hearing, she was questioned about her ties to the ADF. Rushing was asked if she would recuse herself from ADF-related cases if confirmed. She replied: "I would determine the appropriate action with the input of the parties, consultation of these rules and ethical canons, and consultation with my colleagues." Asked about ADF being labeled a "hate group" by the Southern Poverty Law Center, Rushing said: "Hate is wrong, and it should have no place in our society. In my experience with ADF, I have not witnessed anyone expressing or advocating hate."

On January 3, 2019, her nomination was returned to the President under Rule XXXI, Paragraph 6 of the United States Senate. On January 23, 2019, President Trump announced his intent to renominate Rushing for a federal judgeship. Her nomination was sent to the Senate later that day. On February 7, 2019, her nomination was reported out of committee by a 12–10 vote. On March 4, 2019, the Senate invoked cloture on her nomination by a 52–43 vote. On March 5, 2019, Rushing was confirmed by a 53–44 vote. At the time of her confirmation, she was the youngest federal judge in the United States. Rushing received her judicial commission on March 21, 2019.

On September 9, 2020, President Trump named Rushing as a potential choice to fill a United States Supreme Court vacancy if one should open. After the death of Supreme Court Justice Ruth Bader Ginsburg on September 18, President Trump considered nominating Rushing to replace her; however, he chose Judge Amy Coney Barrett of the United States Court of Appeals for the Seventh Circuit instead.

== Personal life ==
Rushing is a Baptist. She is married to Blake Rushing.

== See also ==
- Donald Trump judicial appointment controversies
- List of law clerks for the tenth seat of the Supreme Court of the United States
- Donald Trump Supreme Court candidates

== Selected publications ==
- Jones, Allison B. (2006). "The Rooker-Feldman Doctrine: What Does It Mean to Be Inextricably Intertwined?". Duke Law Journal. 56 (2): 643–679.

Legal offices
Preceded by Allyson K. Duncan	Judge of the United States Court of Appeals for the Fourth Circuit; 2019–present	Incumbent
