= 1928 Florida gubernatorial election =

- November 6, 1928
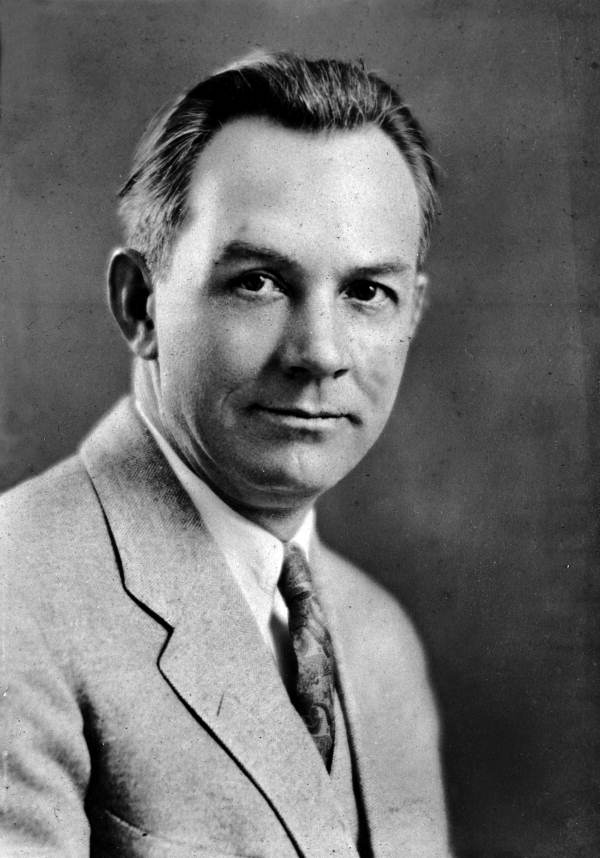

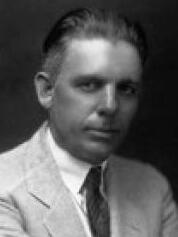
Nominee	Doyle E. Carlton	William J. Howey
Party	Democratic	Republican
Popular vote	148,455	95,018
Percentage	60.97%	39.03%

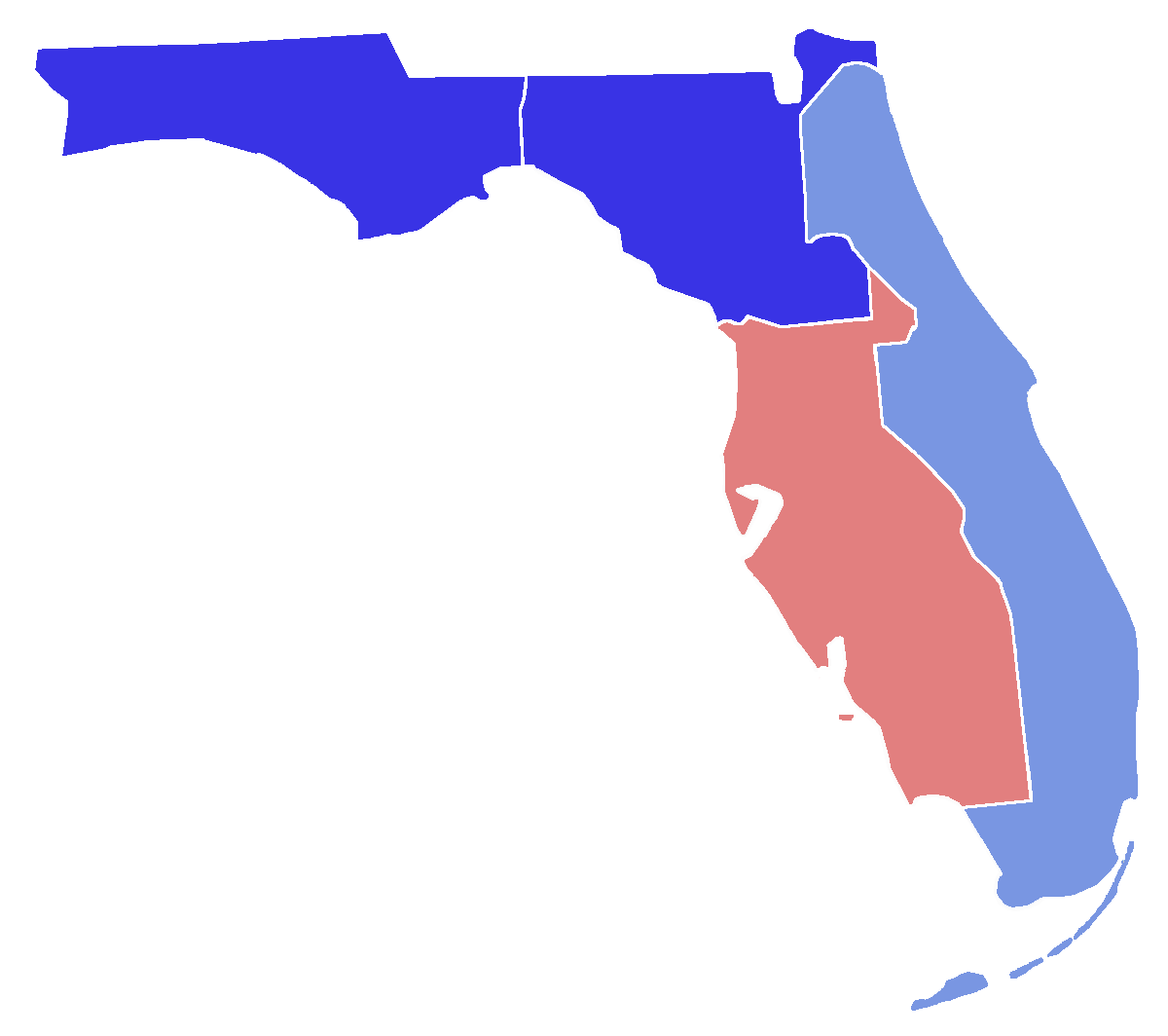
Carlton:
50–60%
60–70%
70–80%
80–90%
>90%
Howey:
50–60%
60–70%
Governor before election
John W. Martin
Democratic
Elected Governor
Doyle E. Carlton
Democratic

The 1928 Florida gubernatorial election was held on November 6, 1928, to elect the Governor of Florida. Democratic nominee Doyle E. Carlton defeated Republican nominee William J. Howey with 60.97% of the vote.

After the 1928 election, no Republican candidate would carry even a single county in a Florida gubernatorial race again until 1960.

== Primary elections ==
Primary elections were held on June 5, 1928.

=== Democratic primary ===
==== Candidates ====
- Doyle E. Carlton, former State Senator
- Sidney Johnston Catts, former Governor
- Fons A. Hathaway, chairman of the Florida State Road Department.
- John Stansel Taylor
- J. M. Carson

==== Results ====
Democratic primary results
Party	Candidate	Votes	%
Democratic	Doyle E. Carlton	77,569	30.42
Democratic	Sidney Johnston Catts	68,984	27.06
Democratic	Fons A. Hathaway	67,849	26.61
Democratic	John Stansel Taylor	37,304	14.63
Democratic	J. M. Carson	3,271	1.28
Total votes		254,977	100.00

== General election ==
=== Candidates ===
- Doyle E. Carlton, Democratic
- William J. Howey, Republican, businessman, real estate developer and mayor of Howey-in-the-Hills.

=== Results ===
1928 Florida gubernatorial election
Party	Candidate	Votes	%	±%
Democratic	Doyle E. Carlton	148,455	60.97%	−21.82%
Republican	William J. Howey	95,018	39.03%	+21.82%
Majority		53,437		
Turnout				
Democratic hold		Swing		

==== County Results ====
County	Doyle E. Carlton Democratic		William J. Howey Republican		Totals
County	#	%	#	%	Totals
Alachua	2,989	77.12%	887	22.88%	3,876
Baker	724	82.65%	152	17.35%	876
Bay	1,583	76.25%	493	23.75%	2,076
Bradford	963	86.06%	156	13.94%	1,119
Brevard	1,747	57.49%	1,292	42.51%	3,039
Broward	2,325	50.62%	2,268	49.38%	4,593
Calhoun	975	93.84%	64	6.16%	1,039
Charlotte	607	60.82%	391	39.18%	998
Citrus	1,002	74.17%	349	25.83%	1,351
Clay	884	63.87%	500	36.13%	1,384
Collier	285	75.20%	94	24.80%	379
Columbia	1,346	89.67%	155	10.33%	1,501
Dade	12,313	47.66%	13,522	52.34%	25,835
DeSoto	939	44.76%	1,159	55.24%	2,098
Dixie	647	76.30%	201	23.70%	848
Duval	18,195	70.33%	7,677	29.67%	25,872
Escambia	5,667	78.14%	1,585	21.86%	7,252
Flagler	366	62.99%	215	37.01%	581
Franklin	655	86.87%	99	13.13%	754
Gadsden	1,461	95.30%	72	4.70%	1,533
Gilchrist	510	87.18%	75	12.82%	585
Glades	380	62.91%	224	37.09%	604
Gulf	381	95.73%	17	4.27%	398
Hamilton	836	85.05%	147	14.95%	983
Hardee	1,440	47.86%	1,569	52.14%	3,009
Hendry	476	73.34%	173	26.66%	649
Hernando	929	67.61%	445	32.39%	1,374
Highlands	1,255	61.55%	784	38.45%	2,039
Hillsborough	11,865	56.77%	9,034	43.23%	20,899
Holmes	2,023	81.15%	470	18.85%	2,493
Indian River	1,065	69.34%	471	30.66%	1,536
Jackson	3,604	90.53%	377	9.47%	3,981
Jefferson	1,144	95.10%	59	4.90%	1,203
Lafayette	506	90.36%	54	9.64%	560
Lake	2,299	45.71%	2,730	54.29%	5,029
Lee	1,611	51.52%	1,516	48.48%	3,127
Leon	2,503	93.85%	164	6.15%	2,667
Levy	1,150	75.66%	370	24.34%	1,520
Liberty	358	96.24%	14	3.76%	372
Madison	985	91.12%	96	8.88%	1,081
Manatee	1,725	40.15%	2,571	59.85%	4,296
Marion	2,602	69.85%	1,123	30.15%	3,725
Martin	586	48.96%	611	51.04%	1,197
Monroe	1,856	68.24%	864	31.76%	2,720
Nassau	1,028	82.17%	223	17.83%	1,251
Okaloosa	1,340	76.53%	411	23.47%	1,751
Okeechobee	900	93.46%	63	6.54%	963
Orange	4,419	48.29%	4,732	51.71%	9,151
Osceola	1,580	54.28%	1,331	45.72%	2,911
Palm Beach	4,300	53.15%	3,790	46.85%	8,090
Pasco	1,455	49.71%	1,472	50.29%	2,927
Pinellas	4,671	33.34%	9,338	66.66%	14,009
Polk	6,304	52.37%	5,734	47.63%	12,038
Putnam	2,251	74.61%	766	25.39%	3,017
Santa Rosa	1,431	70.98%	585	29.02%	2,016
Sarasota	1,419	49.32%	1,458	50.68%	2,877
Seminole	1,928	64.35%	1,068	35.65%	2,996
St. Johns	2,669	65.51%	1,405	34.49%	4,074
St. Lucie	1,355	75.19%	447	24.81%	1,802
Sumter	1,135	56.58%	871	43.42%	2,006
Suwannee	1,818	90.13%	199	9.87%	2,017
Taylor	1,058	87.08%	157	12.92%	1,215
Union	690	96.10%	28	3.90%	718
Volusia	4,923	51.71%	4,598	48.29%	9,521
Wakulla	583	95.57%	27	4.43%	610
Walton	1,946	84.98%	344	15.02%	2,290
Washington	1,490	68.60%	682	31.40%	2,172
Total	148,455	60.97%	95,018	39.03%	243,473

Counties that flipped from Democratic to Republican

- Dade
- DeSoto
- Hardee
- Lake
- Manatee
- Marion
- Orange
- Pasco
- Pinellas
- Sarasota
