= Doyle Carlton =

Doyle Carlton may refer to:

- Doyle E. Carlton (1885–1972), American lawyer and politician
- Doyle E. Carlton Jr. (1922–2003), American politician
