= Katharine Budd =

American architect

Katharine Cotheal Budd
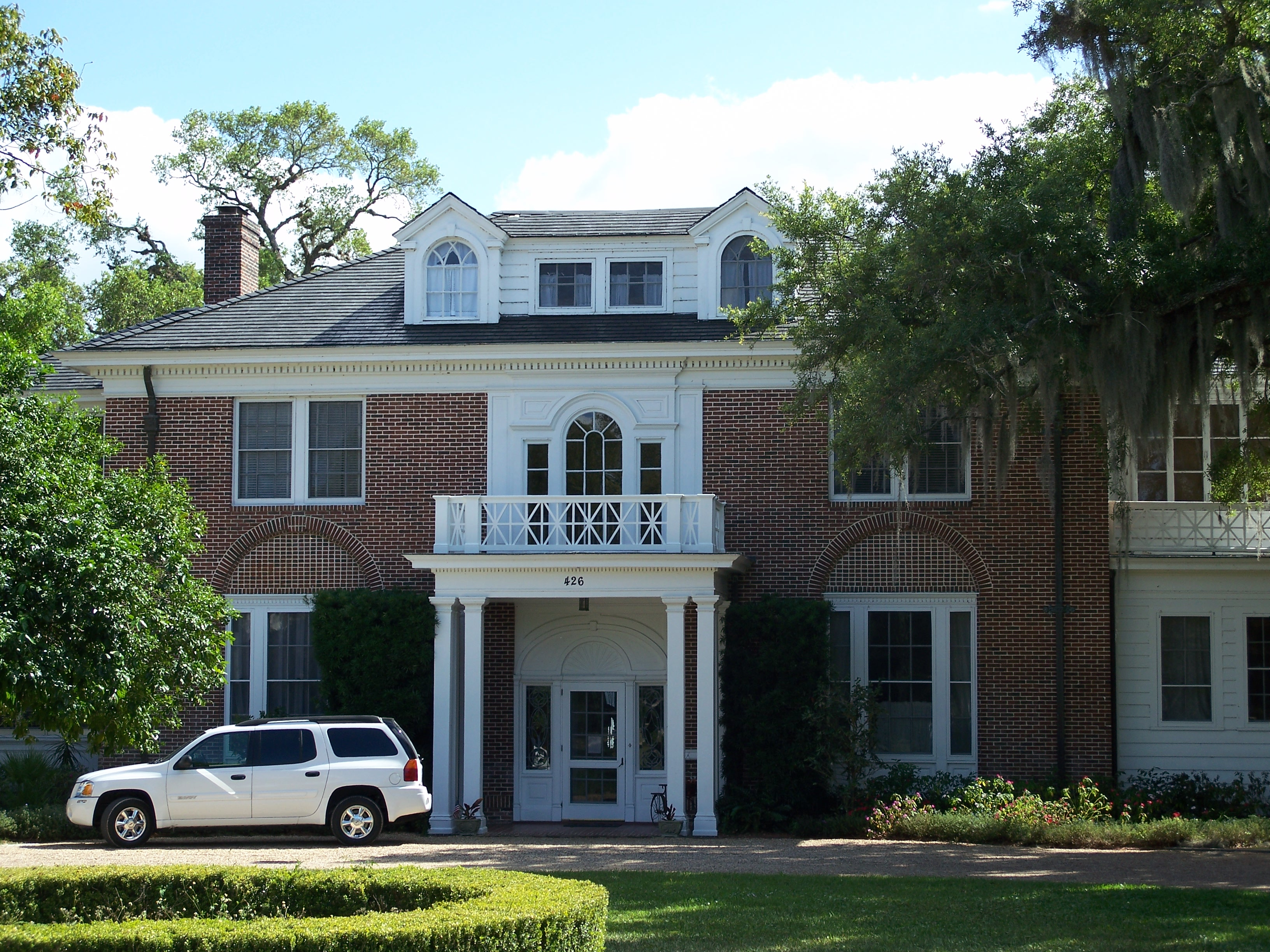
- The Harry C. Duncan House designed by Katharine Budd
- Born: 1860
- Died: 1951 (aged 91)
- Occupation: Architect

Katharine Cotheal Budd (1860–1951) was a pioneering woman architect and author who ran a New York City architectural practice for over three decades. She became a member of the American Institute of Architects in 1924. She obtained an architectural license in Georgia in 1920.

== Biography ==
From 1891–1894, Katharine Cotheal Budd studied art and design at William Merritt Chase's Shinnecock Hills Summer School of Art in Long Island; after which, she served as secretary and administer of the cottages and had the opportunity to renovate several of the buildings. While not formally trained in architecture, she learned from architect and Columbia University professor William R. Ware. Additionally she worked with architects Grosvenor Atterbury, Grenville T. Snelling, and William Appleton Potter. After 1910, she entered into a partnership with Henry G. Emery and they worked together for several years. She maintained a Manhattan office since 1899, and employed Esther Marjorie Hill from 1925–1928. Primarily her work was in Arts and Crafts, Colonial Revival, and Mediterranean styles. By 1908, Budd had designed more than 100 houses, but also designed hospitals and churches.

During World War I Budd, along with architects Julia Morgan and Fay Kellogg, designed Hostess Houses for the YMCA, which specifically sought women architects. They were facilities for female friends and relatives of troops and located near existing army bases; Budd's were located in the South and Midwest. The first she designed was the Great Lakes Hostess House, taking God's Providence House of Chester, England as precedent. She was responsible for 72 of the 96 Hostess Houses, either designing or renovation the projects; most are modelled from barns and country houses.

Budd designed the Harry C. Duncan house in Tavares, one of the best examples of the Colonial Revival style in Florida. She also designed the Innis Arden Cottage at "Innis Arden" (now known as Greenwich Point), the former Old Greenwich, Connecticut estate of Mr. and Mrs. J. Kennedy Tod. The Innis Arden Cottage, built in 1903, has been recognized as a seminal example of early Bungalow-style architecture and was the subject of an award-winning restoration by the Greenwich Point Conservancy between 2006–2011.

Budd had been practicing architecture for over 30 years when she applied for recognition by the American Institute of Architects. She became the first woman member of the New York chapter of the AIA in 1924. She designed "Hostess Houses" for the YWCA in the South and Mid-west.

In addition to practicing, Budd contributed to journals, such as Architectural Record, Country Life, and American Homes and Gardens in the 1900s, which focused on kitchen, pantry, and Japanese design.

== Works ==
- 1894–1896 Shinnecock School (with Atterbury), later renovated for Anne Porter, cottage for Zella de Milhau (alone), Long Island
- 1908 Burchel House, alterations, 29 E. 63rd St. New York (1908)
- before 1910 Adelaïde Alsop Robineau House in Syracuse (Four Winds House)
- c.1910 YWCA Hostess Houses, including those located in Columbia, Spartenburg, South Carolina, Charlotte, Augusta, Camp Mills, and Camp Dodge, Iowa
- 1925 Harry C. Duncan House, Tavares, Florida, National Register, 1997
- 1925–1927 M.G. Howey House, Lake County, Florida, (National Register, 1983)
- n.d. Great Lakes Naval Training Station, Illinois
- n.d. Facade of 65 East 80th Street for Francis R. Arnold, New York City
- n.d. Anna Winegar Studio, alterations, Bronxville, New York
- n.d. Clarissa and Walter Stillman House, Syracuse
