= Shinnecock Hills Summer School of Art =

Former art school in Shinnecock Hills, New York

- Art Studio at Shinnecock Hills Summer School of Art
- Formation: 1891
- Founder: Janet Ralston Chase Hoyt
- Dissolved: 1902; 124 years ago
- Purpose: summer art school devoted to plein air painting
- Location: Southampton, New York
- Director: William Merritt Chase

The Shinnecock Hills Summer School of Art was summer school of art in Shinnecock Hills, Long Island that existed from 1891 to 1902. The director was William Merritt Chase. The school was one of the first and most popular plein air painting schools in America. During the time Chase was teaching at Shinnecock Hills he painted some of his most notable Impressionist landscapes.

== History ==
Chase teaching at the Shinnecock Hills Summer School of Art

Mrs. William Hoyt (Janet Ralston Chase Hoyt) was a New York philanthropist, developer, and artist. She was a summer resident of Southampton, Long Island and had the desire to start a summer art school providing training in open air landscape painting. She asked Chase to teach at the school. At that time Chase was well-regarded as a painter and a teacher. Hoyt also approached fellow Southampton residents Mrs. Henry Kirke Porter (Annie de Gamp Perrot Hegeman Porter) and Samuel Longstreth Parrish to provide financial support. Porter and Parrish provided the land for a large studio. The land abutting the studio, named the "Art Village", had residential cottages.

The first classes were taught in the summer of 1891 before any construction on the studio or the "Art Village". The school rented an old farmhouse and Chase lived at the Shinncock Inn. The students could stay in Samuel Parrish's home or rent rooms in the area. The first summer was a success. By the summer of 1892, there were more than 100 students enrolled The studio and several cottages were completed, and classes were held at the location where it would continue to operate until its closure in 1902.

Chase taught for two days each week. On Mondays he would hold a studio critique, reviewing the student work from the previous week. On Tuesdays Chase would set up his easel in the Shinncock Hills and paint while providing instruction. Chase encouraged his students to paint in the bright light, omitting preliminary sketches, and matching the colors painted to those observed. Students spent the rest of the week working on their paintings, either outside in the dunes, or in the studio during inclement weather. Classes were taught by other artists, for example Lydia Field Emmet taught beginning drawing.

In 1897, the school made a change in the name and administration due to Chase severing his ties with the school's co-sponsor, the Brooklyn Institute. The name was changed to the Shinnecock School of Art for Men and Women. Chase became the president, with Charles Webster Hawthorne and Douglas John Connah serving as administrators.

From 1891 to 1902, about 1,000 students studied at the Shinnecock Hills Summer School of Art.

The school was successful, but Chase returned to spending his summers in Europe and the school closed in 1902.

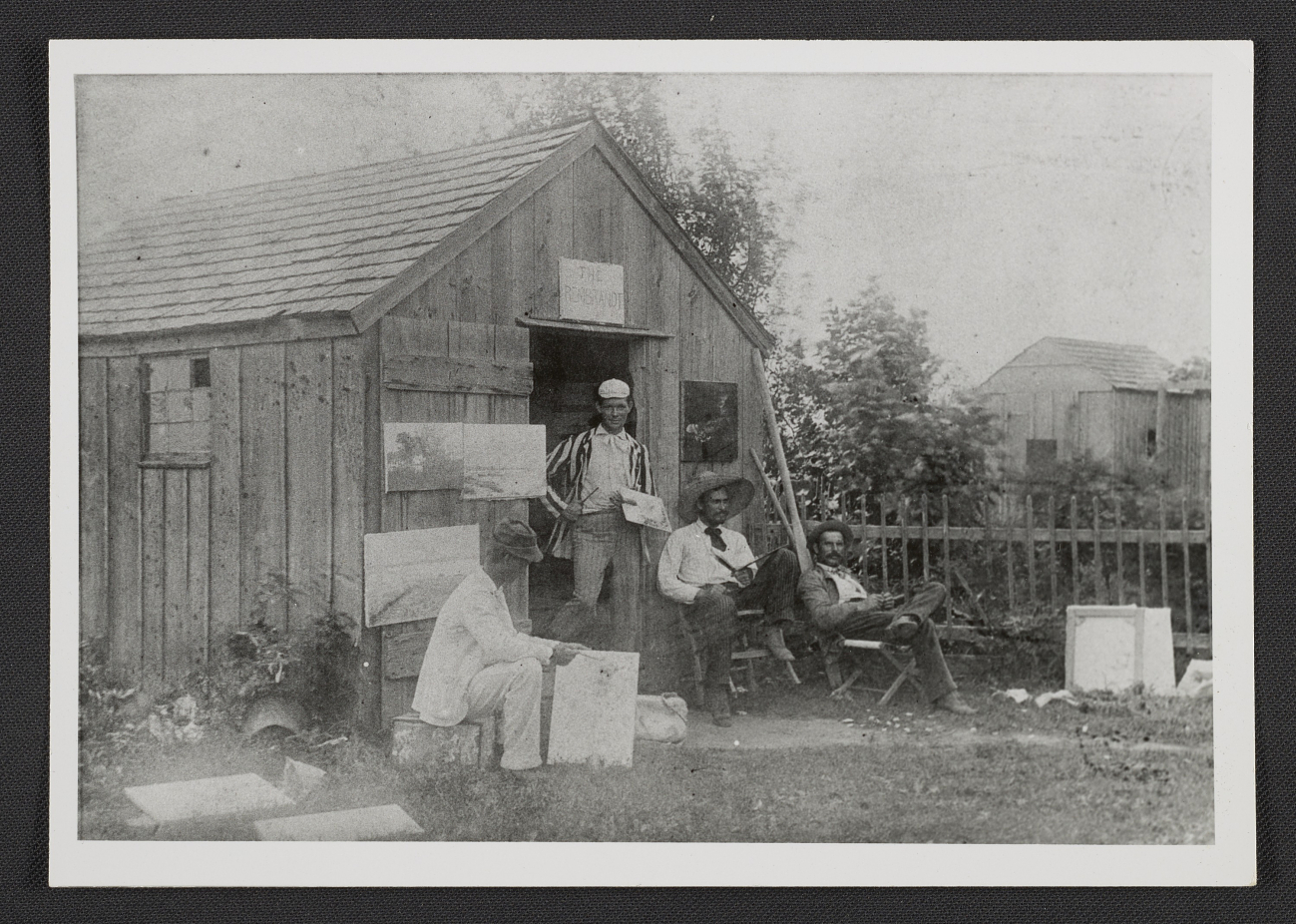
Students at Shinnecock Hills Summer School of Art, ca. 1895

== Buildings ==
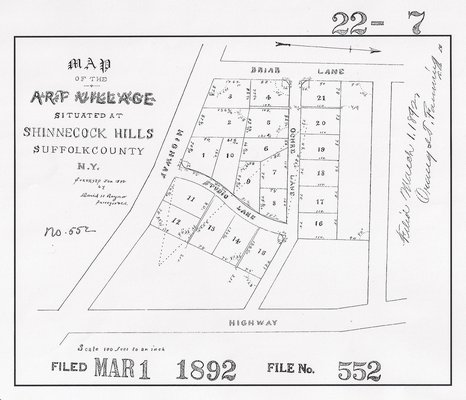
Map of the Art Village Situated at Shinnecock Hills

The Art Studio was at the northeastern edge of the property, built with an exterior of log slabs.. The interior was one large workspace, with a large 2-sided easel in the center of the room.

The "Art Village" had cottages that were built by the individual owners of the residential lots. They were built in a variety of rustic styles, including Colonial Revival and early Arts and Crafts, and mostly clad in natural shingles. Several of the cottages were designed by former students Grosvenor Atterbury and Katharine Budd. The cottages were often rented out to students. The "Art Village" was designated as a Hamlet Heritage Resource Area by the Southampton Town Board in 2012.

A few miles down the road a summer home and studio were built for Chase and his family. They were designed by Stanford White.

== Location ==
The Shinnecock Hills Summer School of Art was located on the south fork of Long Island, New York in Shinnecock Hills just west of Southampton. At the time the school was started, the 4,000 acres of Shinnecock Hills was being developed by the Long Island Improvement Company (LIIC) which was a subsidiary of the Long Island Railroad. The school was close to the Shinnecock Hills station located on the Sag Harbor branch of the Long Island Railroad, about three hours by rail from New York City. The LIIC sold the land for the studio to benefactors Porter and Parrish. The LIIC also sold the land for the adjacent 21 residential lots (the "Art Village") to private individuals, most of whom were associated with the school. The Hoyt family, the Parrish family, and Grosvenor Atterbury purchased multiple lots.

== Gallery ==
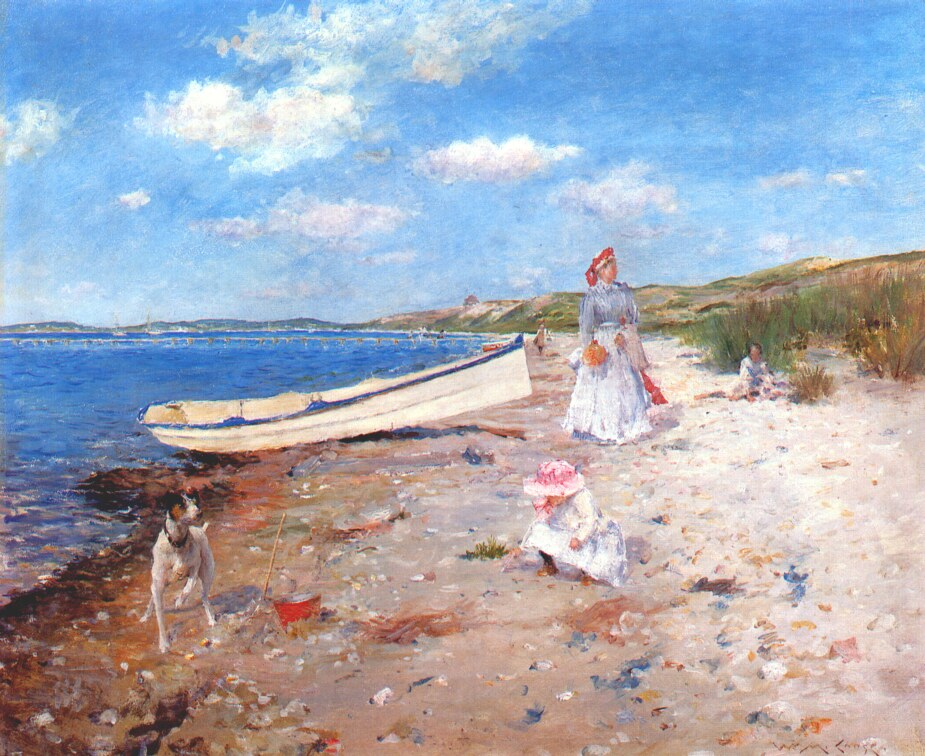
W. M. Chase A Sunny Day at Shinnecock Bay, c. 1892

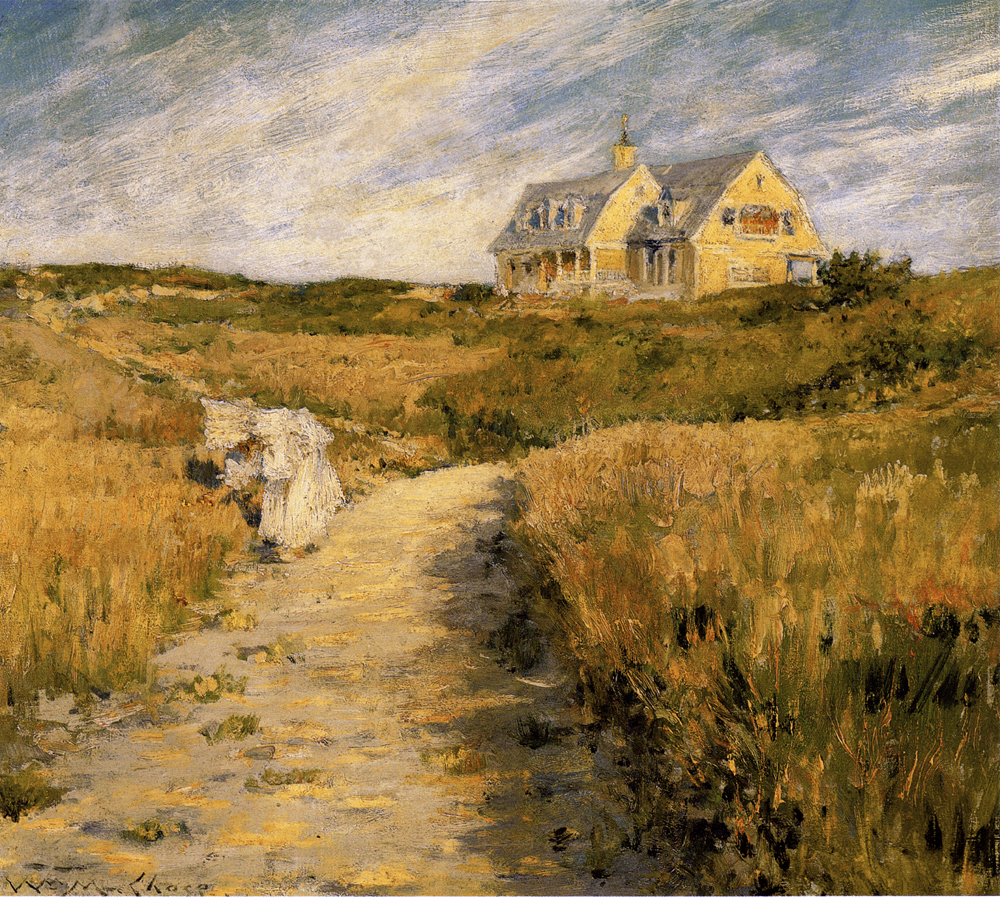
W. M. Chase The Chase Homestead, Shinnecock. c. 1893

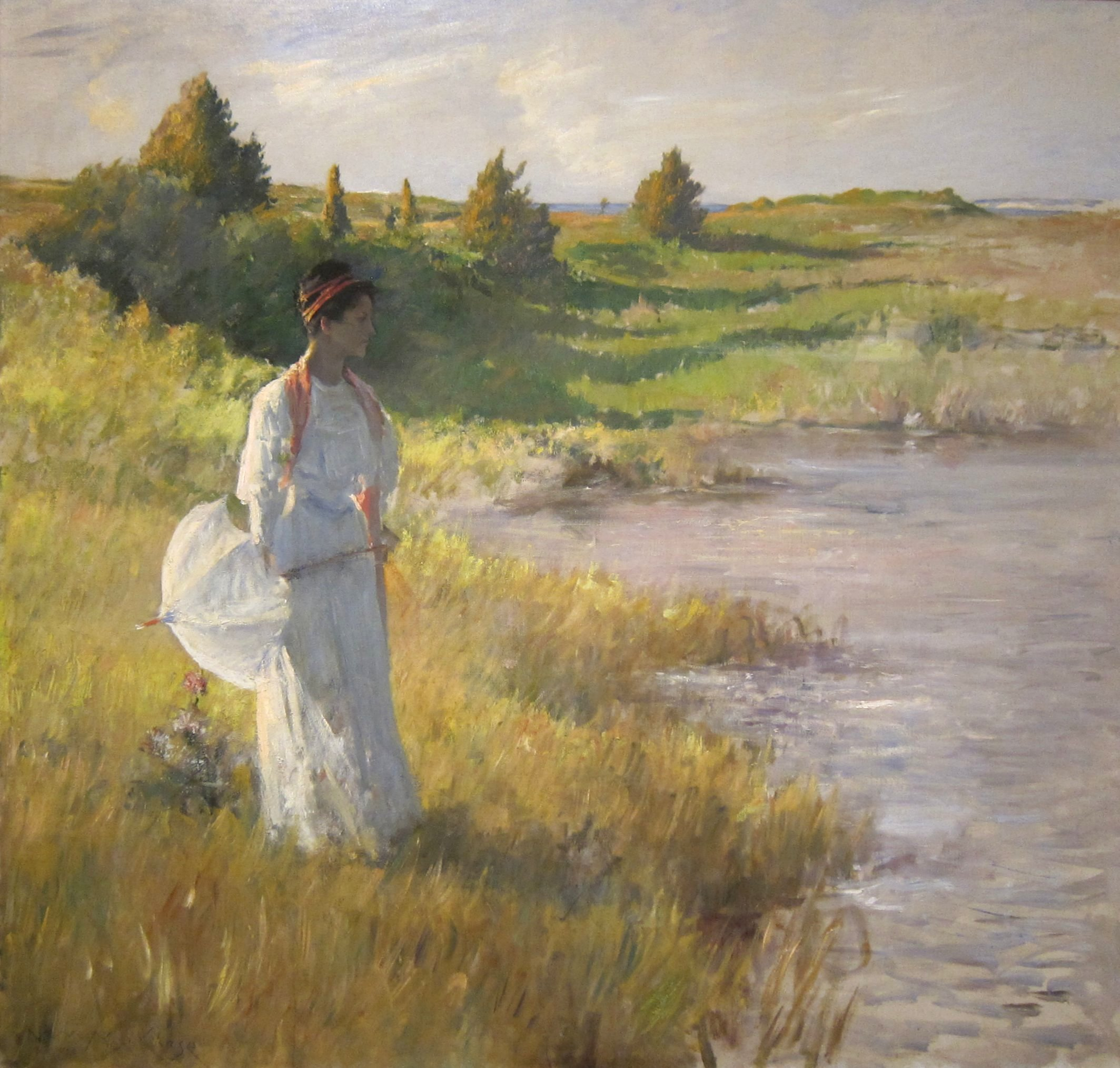
W. M. Chase An Afternoon Stroll, c. 1895

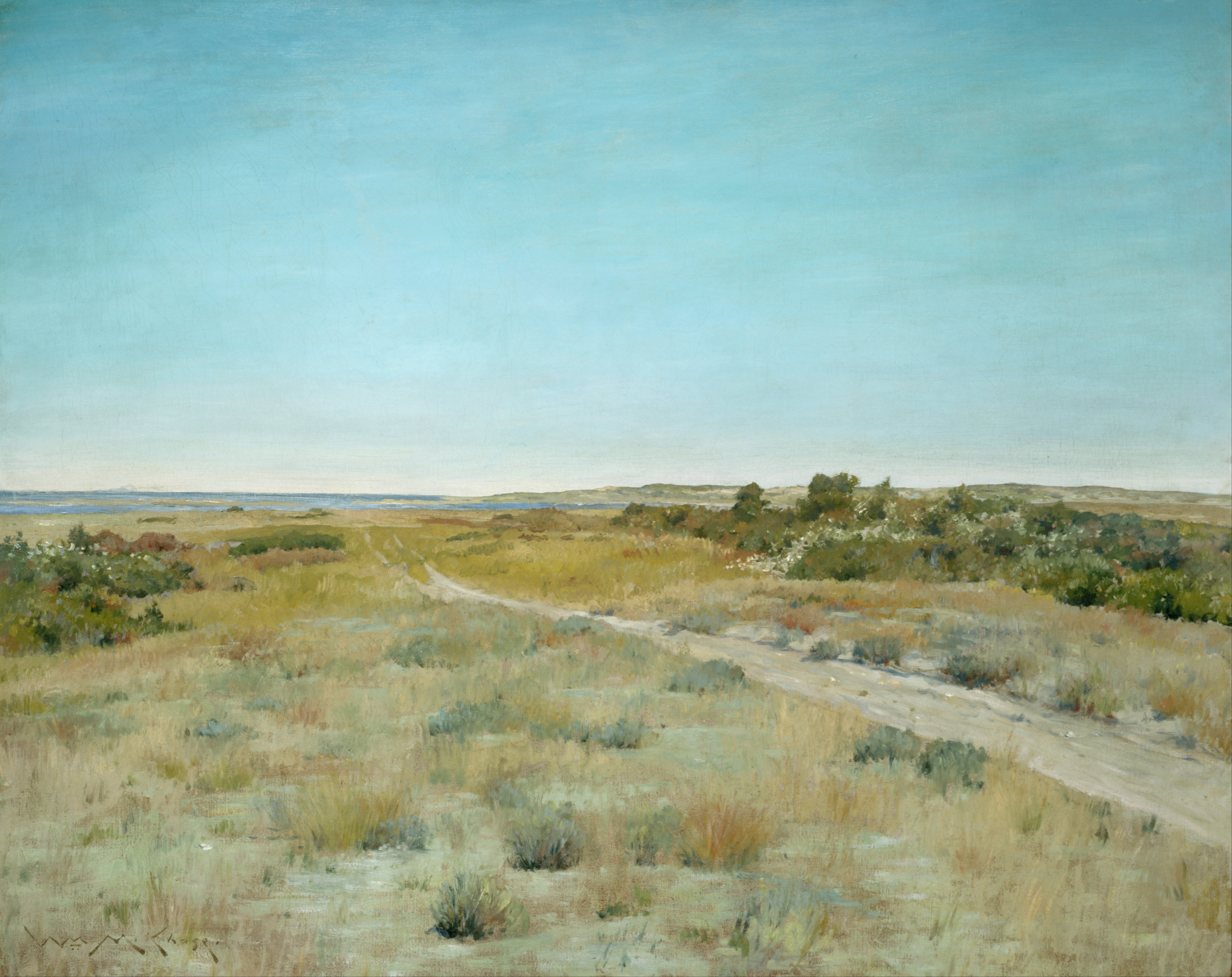
W. M. Chase First Touch of Autumn, 1898

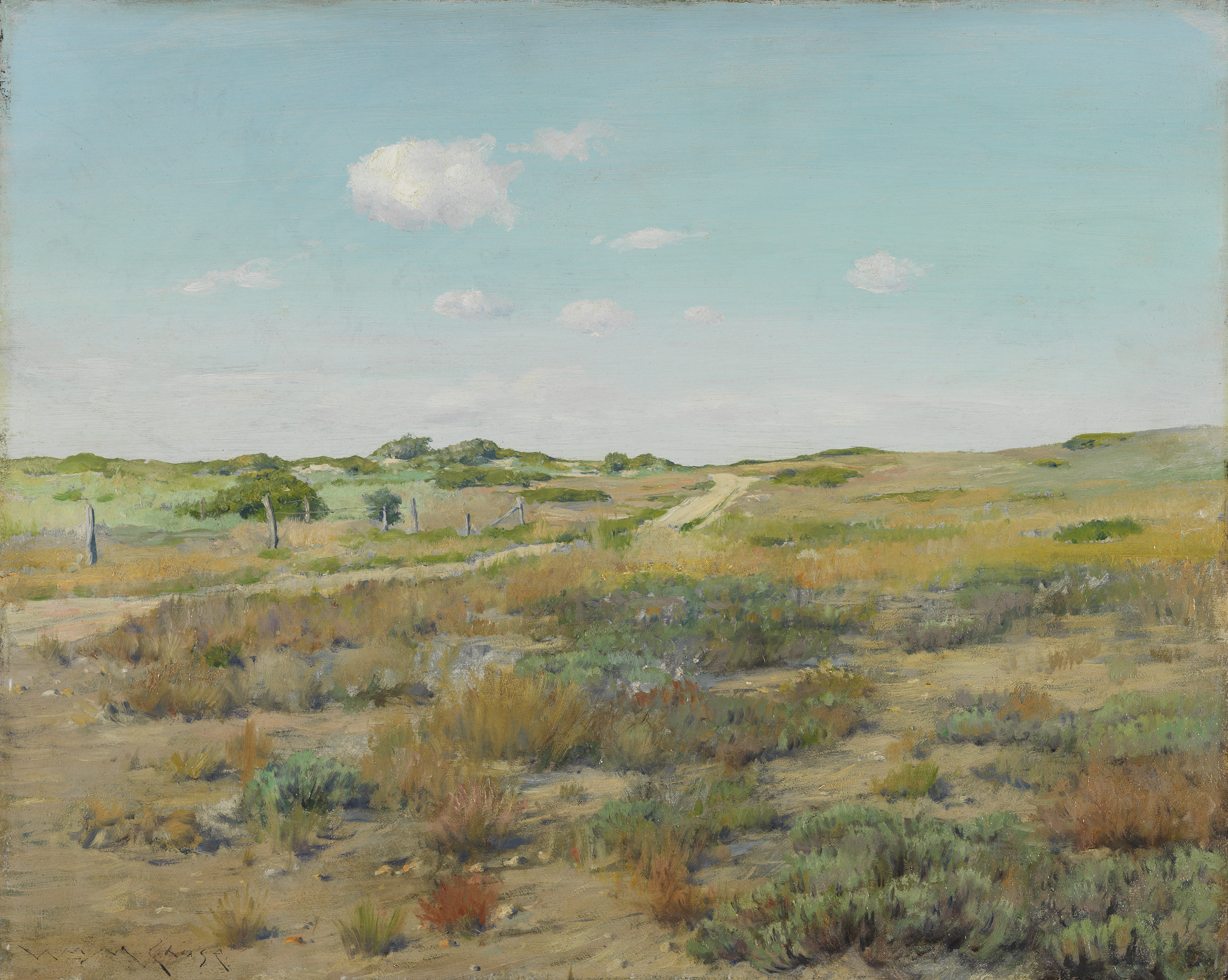
W. M. Chase Shinnecock Hills, between 1893 and 1897

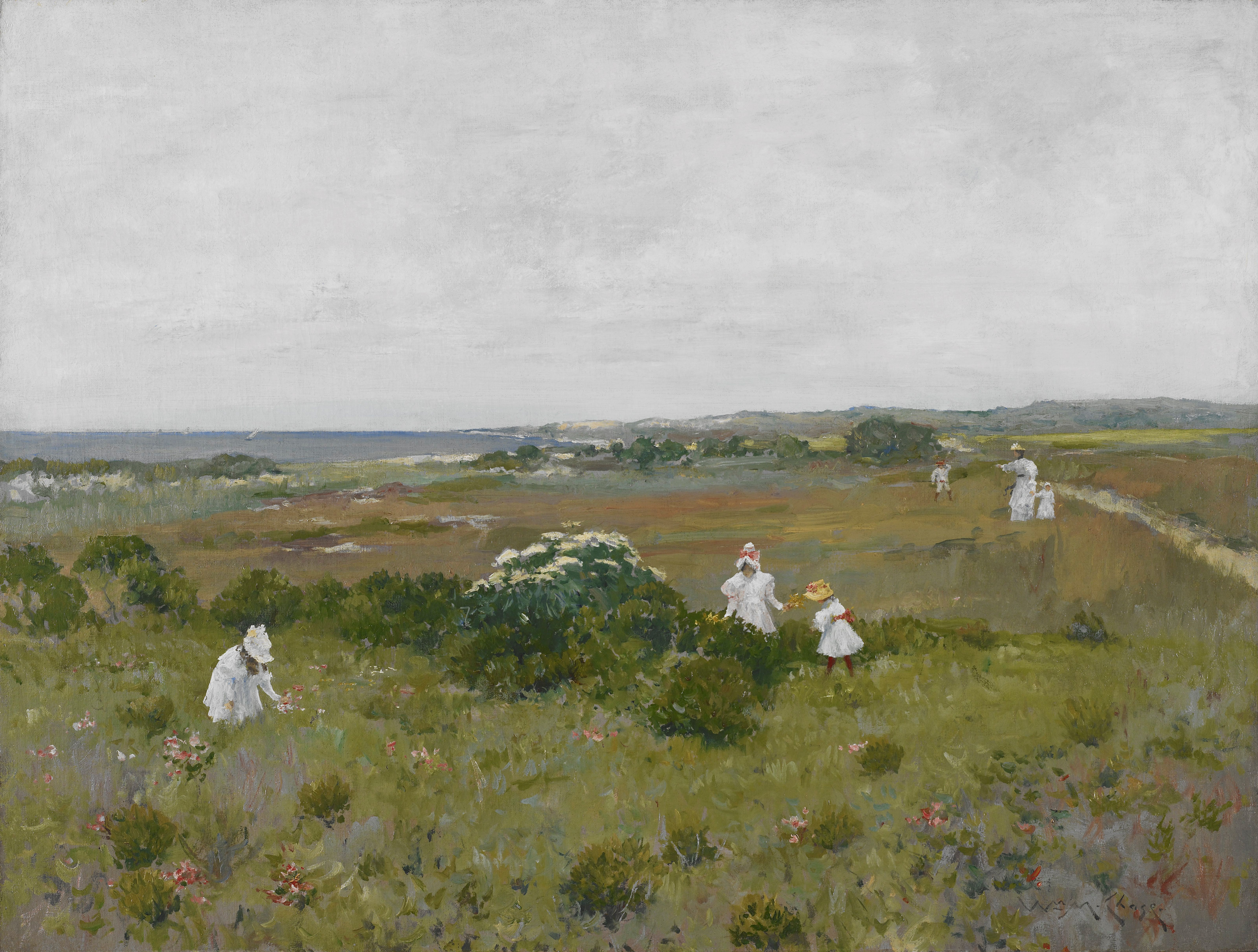
W. M. Chase Seaside Flowers, 1890s

== Notable alumni ==
- Gifford Beal
- Annie Cooper Boyd
- Katharine Budd
- Howard Chandler Christy
- Kate Freeman Clark
- Emma Eilers
- Lillian Baynes Griffin
- Indiana Gyberson
- Lilian Westcott Hale
- Charles Webster Hawthorne
- Edith Haworth
- Ella Sophonisba Hergesheimer
- Rockwell Kent
- Susan Merrill Ketcham
- Emma B. King
- Annie Traquair Lang
- Emma Mendenhall
- Zella de Milhau
- Rhoda Holmes Nicholls
- Julian Onderdonk
- Ellen Emmet Rand
- Joseph Stella
- Alice Woods Ullman
