= Susan Merrill Ketcham =

American painter

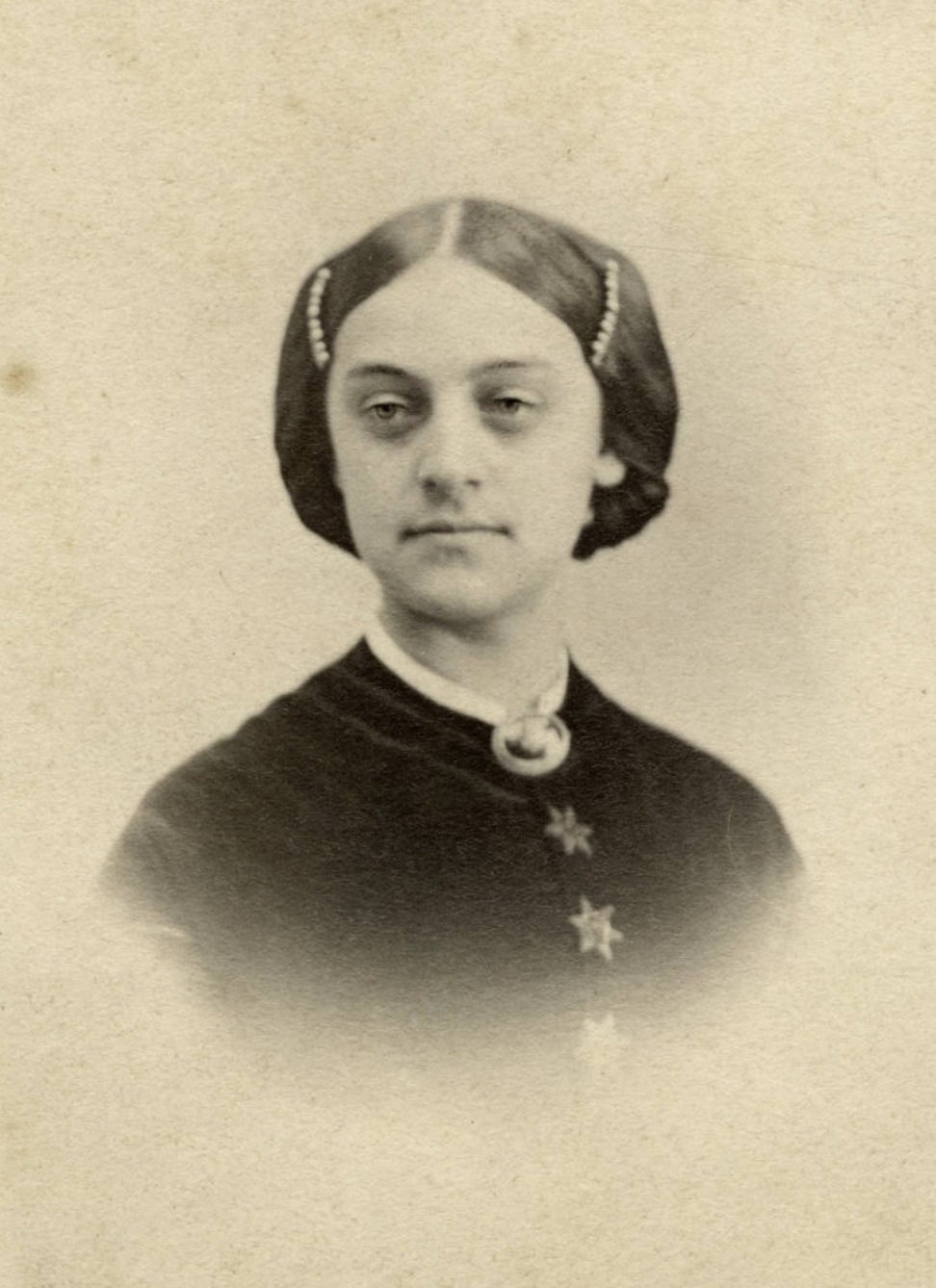
- Ketcham in the 1860s
- Born: June 28, 1841; Indianapolis, Indiana
- Died: February 1, 1930 (aged 88); Indianapolis, Indiana
- Resting place: Crown Hill and Arboretum, Section 7, Lot 54; 39.8213183°N 86.1752695°W
- Known for: Painting

Susan Merrill Ketcham (June 28, 1841 – February 1, 1930) was an American painter. In 1883 she helped organize the Art Association of Indianapolis.

== Biography ==
Ketcham was born on June 28, 1841 Indianapolis, Indiana. Both sides of her family had an illustrious history in the state. Her father, John Lewis Ketcham, was a prominent lawyer, and son of early Indiana settler Col. John Ketcham. Her mother, Jane Merrill Ketcham, was the daughter of the first treasurer of Indiana, Samuel Merrill. Susan was the third child of John and Jane, with five younger siblings, including William A. Ketcham, Attorney General of Indiana from 1894 to 1898. The Ketcham children's earliest art education came from the wife of Bishop Talbott, who taught them both music and painting at home.

== Career ==
Ketcham studied at the Indiana School of Art, the Art Students League of New York, and the School of the Art Institute of Chicago. She also attended the Shinnecock Hills Summer School of Art. Her teachers included William Merritt Chase and Charles Herbert Woodbury.

Ketcham was a member of the Society of Independent Artists and the National Association of Women Painters and Sculptors. She exhibited at the Hoosier Salon, the Boston Art Club, the National Academy of Design, the Society of Independent Artists, and the National Association of Women Painters and Sculptors. Ketcham also exhibited her work at the Palace of Fine Arts at the 1893 World's Columbian Exposition in Chicago, Illinois and at the 1904 Louisiana Purchase Exposition in St. Louis, Missouri.

In 1883 she was one of a group of eighteen women, led by May Wright Sewall, who founded the Art Association of Indianapolis (AAI) to promote art appreciation and education in Indianapolis. The AAI helped promote the work of many budding Indianapolis artists, such as Charles Joseph Fiscus (1861–1884), and eventually morphed into the Indianapolis Museum of Art and the Herron School of Art.

From about 1886–88, Ketcham joined her mother and two of her siblings on a trip to Europe "for music and health". While in Florence, Italy, she felt the initial calling to become a painter and later found inspiration in Switzerland, where she started her studies.

Upon returning to the United States she enrolled in the Art Students League in New York in 1888, and that same year was elected a life member. She remained in New York City for most of the next three decades, spending her summers in Ogunquit, Maine, and making periodic trips home to Indianapolis.

Ketcham's first solo exhibit was held in the H. Lieber Company gallery in Indianapolis in June 1900, although her work had previously been displayed in many other exhibits across the country. The show included a collection of 60 oils, water colors, and pastels.

One of Ketcham's more celebrated pieces was a painting of her mother, originally titled Portrait of a Lady and later changed to Portrait of My Mother. It was exhibited during the Columbian Exposition in Chicago in 1893.

She lived in a New York apartment near her studio in Carnegie Hall, until she decided to return home to Indianapolis in 1927.

== Legacy ==
Ketcham died on February 1, 1930, in Indianapolis.

Prior to this event, in 1928, she gifted a piece entitled Evening to Indiana University, her father's alma mater. The piece was made in his memory. She also gave After the Storm to the John Herron Art Institute, now the Herron School of Art and Design at IUPUI. Prior to her death she stipulated that other works would be donated to schools around the city.

After Ketcham's death the John Herron Art Institute arranged a memorial exhibition of 22 paintings in the Marott Hotel.

== Gallery ==
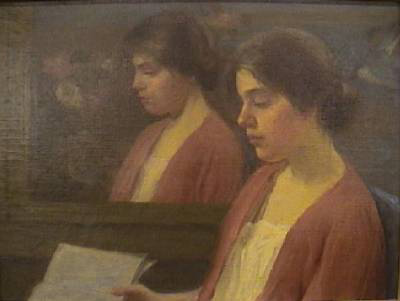
The Reflection

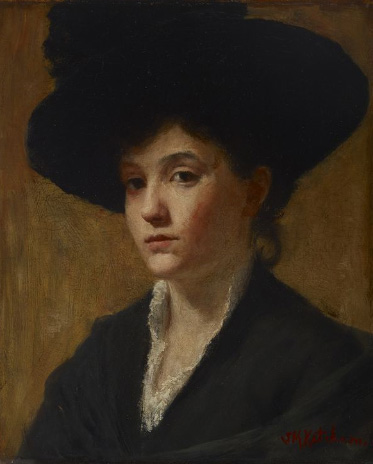
Study of a Hat, 1889

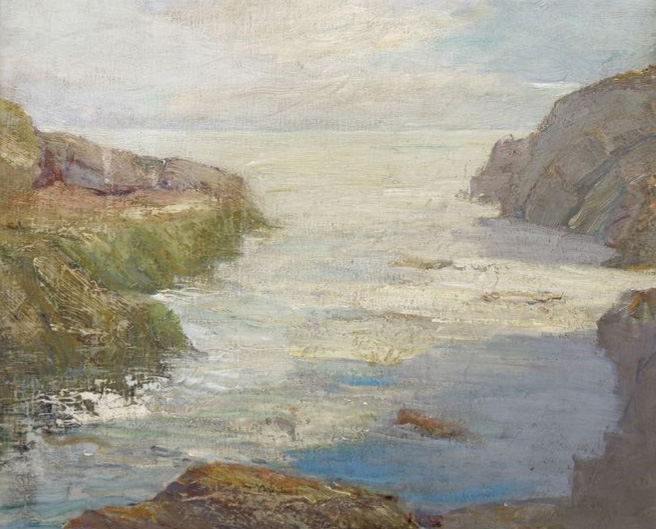
At Low Tide
