= Esther Hill =

Canadian architect and artist

Esther Marjorie Hill
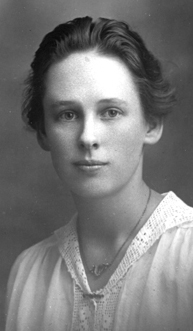
- A studio portrait of Hill, taken between 1923 and 1928
- Born: Esther Marjorie Hill; May 29, 1895; Guelph, Ontario, Canada
- Died: January 7, 1985 (aged 89)
- Education: University of Toronto
- Known for: Architect

Esther Marjorie Hill (May 29, 1895 – January 7, 1985) was a Canadian architect and the first woman to graduate in architecture from the University of Toronto (1920).

== Early life ==
Hill was born in Guelph, Ontario. Her father, E. Lincoln Hill, was a teacher and librarian for the Edmonton Public Library (where he served as Chief Librarian, 1912-1936), and her mother, Jennie Stork Hill, was one of the first 10 women to study at the University of Toronto. After earning her Bachelor of Arts degree at the University of Alberta in 1916, Hill started taking classes in architecture at the same institution, until the program was canceled and she had to transfer to the University of Toronto. She graduated in 1920, becoming the first woman from the University of Toronto to receive a university degree in architecture.

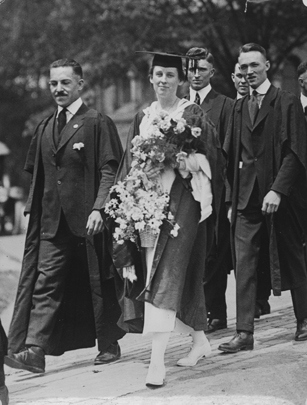
Hill graduating from the University of Toronto in 1920.

== Career ==
Hill struggled during her early career because of her gender. Backlash was felt from men in the architecture business, and opportunities were lacking for Hill. Upon graduation Hill was only able to find one job opportunity: as an interior designer at Eaton's department store. Eventually she returned to Edmonton. In 1920 and 1921 she authored a series of articles in the journal Agricultural Alberta, describing her functional approach to domestic architecture and her belief in designing to allow in as much natural light as possible. Her application to join the Alberta Association of Architects may have been declined because she lacked the mandatory one year experience. Despite struggles, she found a job as a drafter at MacDonald and Magoon Architects in Edmonton. In the fall of 1922, she started taking classes in urban planning from the University of Toronto.

She went to New York City and studied at Columbia University, apprenticing under Anna Schenck, Marcia Mead, and Katharine Budd. Upon returning to Canada, she reapplied to the Alberta Association of Architects. In 1925, Esther Hill became the first Canadian woman to be a registered architect.

She returned to New York to work with another woman architect but moved back to Edmonton in 1928. She once more worked part-time for MacDonald and Magoon and continued to struggle to find full-time work. The Great Depression hit, making things worse. Hill turned to anything she could to bring in income: teaching, weaving, making gloves and greeting cards. She moved to Victoria, British Columbia in 1936 with her parents, and after World War II she founded her own architectural firm. She still continued to weave, joining the Victoria Handweavers' and Spinners' Guild. She won first prize in weaving at the Canadian National Exhibition in 1942.

In 1953, she joined the Architectural Institute of British Columbia and served on the city planning committee for five years. Working out of her parents' home, drafting designs on their dining room table, she became an independent architect in Victoria, until her retirement in 1963. Hill's work was described as "utterly alone" in the male dominated world of architecture. While in Victoria, she designed houses, churches, apartment buildings, retirement homes, and kitchens. She died in 1985.

Some of her drawings are in the Archives of the University of Toronto.
