= Howey Mansion =

Historic house in Florida, United States

- Howey House
- U.S. National Register of Historic Places
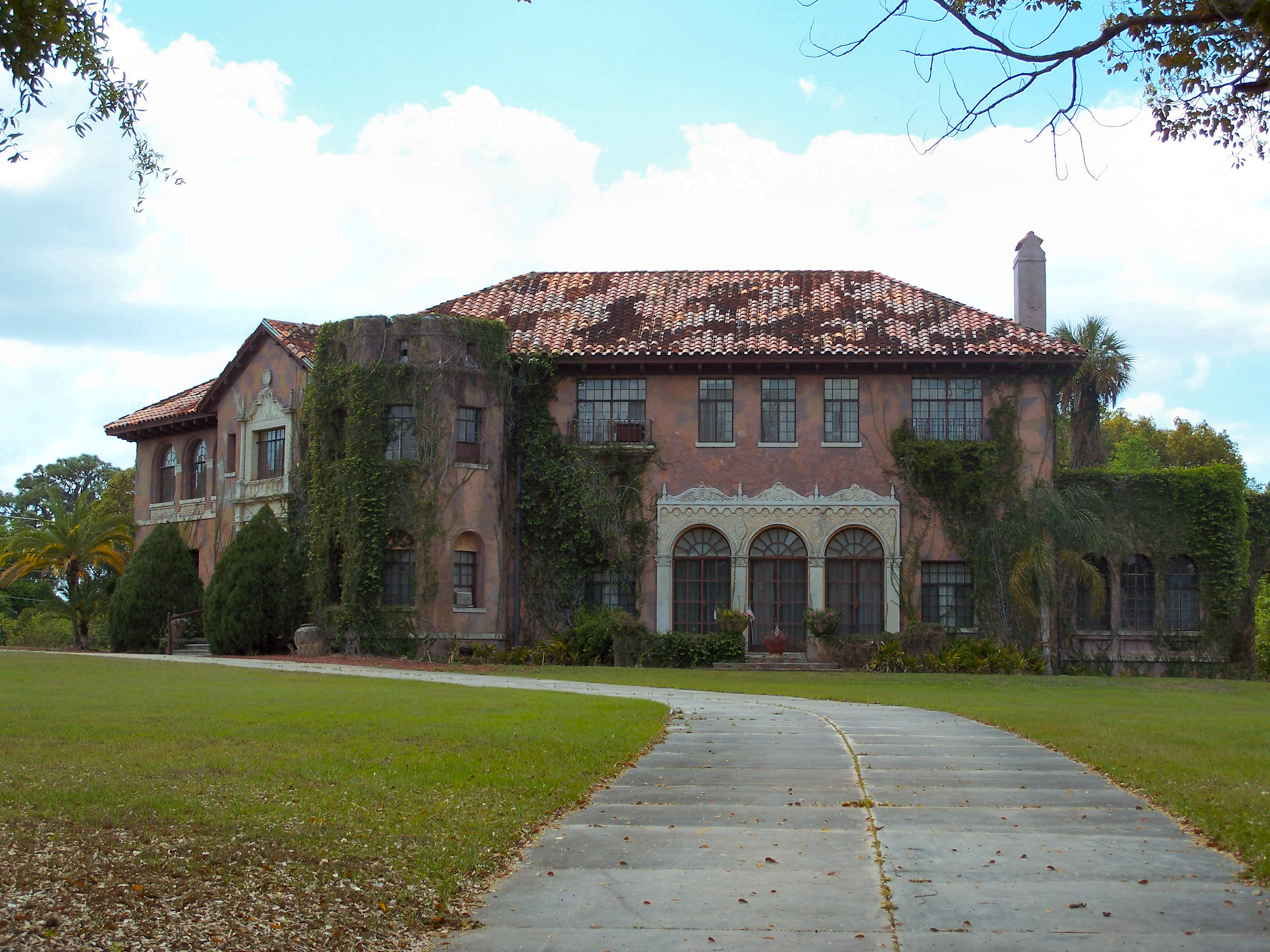

- Location within Florida Location within the United States
- Location: Howey-in-the-Hills, Florida
- Coordinates: 28°43′22″N 81°46′30″W
- NRHP reference No.: 83001426
- Added to NRHP: January 27, 1983

The Howey Mansion is a historic home in Howey-in-the-Hills, Florida, United States. It is located at 1001 North Citrus Avenue, Howey in the Hills, Florida. The mansion is a 7188 square foot, 20 room Mediterranean Revival Style home.

Howey Mansion is named after William John Howey, who founded Howey in the Hills.

The house was designed by architect Katharine Cotheal Budd from 1925 to 1927. On January 27, 1983, it was added to the U.S. National Register of Historic Places.

On April 12, 2017, the house was listed for sale at $480,000. It reportedly attracted widespread attention, with prospective buyers traveling hundreds of miles to see the home. More than 10 offers were made on the home after just 9 days on the market.

The new owners, Brad and Clay Cowherd, Orlando real estate investors and entrepreneurs, have made progress on a period-accurate restoration of the house. It will be a venue for weddings and events.
