= Doyle E. Carlton =

American lawyer and politician (1885–1972)

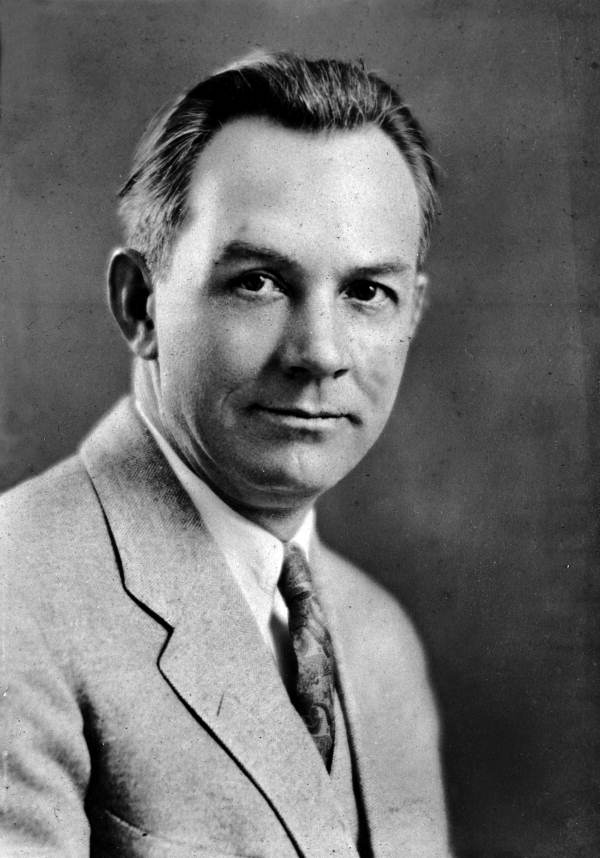

25th Governor of Florida
- In office January 8, 1929 – January 3, 1933
- Preceded by: John W. Martin
- Succeeded by: David Sholtz

City Attorney of Tampa
- In office 1925–1927
- Preceded by: Hilton S. Hampton
- Succeeded by: Karl E. Whitaker

Member of the Florida Senate from the 11th district
- In office 1916–1918
- Preceded by: William F. Himes
- Succeeded by: John Stansel Taylor

Personal details
- Born: Doyle Elam Carlton; July 6, 1885 Wauchula, Florida, U.S.
- Died: October 25, 1972 (aged 87) Tampa, Florida, U.S.
- Resting place: Myrtle Hill Memorial Park in Tampa
- Party: Democratic
- Spouse: Nell Ray Carlton
- Children: Martha Katharine Carlton Ward; Mary Ellen Carlton Ott; Doyle Elam Carlton, Jr.
- Education: University of Chicago (AB); Columbia University (LLB)
- Profession: Attorney, Politician

Doyle Elam Carlton Sr. (July 6, 1885 – October 25, 1972) was an American lawyer and conservative politician who served as the 25th Governor of the state of Florida from 1929 to 1933. Prior to becoming governor he served in the Florida Senate and then as city attorney for Tampa, Florida.

== Early life ==
Doyle Elam Carlton, the son of Albert and Martha Winfield McEwen Carlton, was born in Wauchula, Florida on July 6, 1885. He was born eighth out of ten children. He received his primary education in Wauchula and, as there was then no local high school, attended Stetson Academy where he served as an editor for the school newspaper and officer of the Phi Kappa Delta Society (later to become Delta Sigma Phi). He subsequently graduated from the Liberal Arts College of Stetson University with an A.B. in 1909. Doyle then attended The University of Chicago where he received an A.B. in 1910. He earned his L.L.B. in 1912 from Columbia University. In 1912, he was admitted to the practice of law in Florida and practiced law in Tampa beginning in that year. On July 30, 1912, in Tampa, Doyle married Nell Ray, daughter of Edward Dennis and Mary Ellen Smith Ray.

== Early political career ==
His political career began in 1916 when he was elected to the Florida Senate for a two-year term as state senator from the 11th District, composed of Hillsborough and Pinellas counties.

After serving in the State Senate, Carlton served as Tampa's city attorney from 1925 to 1927. His Republican opponent, William J. Howey, during the gubernatorial campaign run in 1928 stated Carlton got large fees from selling municipal bonds when he was attorney and dodged serving in World War I.

== 1928 Gubernatorial election ==
In the Democratic primary on June 5, 1928 he received 77,569 first choice and 28,471 second choice votes to win in a field of five candidates, who included former Governor Sidney J. Catts. In November 1928, Doyle defeated his Republican opponent, William John Howey, by a margin of 148,455 votes to 95,018 votes. He assumed the office of governor on January 8, 1929. During Carlton's campaign he ran on the platform of "good government, good schools, and good roads".

== Governorship ==
During his term, he faced several financial problems caused by the Great Depression which begun under his term. He reduced payrolls and cut many state jobs to attempt to reduce the state's budget. Carlton also supported more banking regulations. He reduced his salary as governor from $9,000 to $7,500.

During his tenure as governor the state faced other issues including the collapse of Florida's land boom, a violent hurricane, and a Mediterranean Tephritidae infestation. He left office on January 3, 1933, returning to Tampa, Florida.

Although Carlton opposed inheritance and income taxes along with legalizing parimutuel betting, a three-cent gas tax was created during his term to help finance the construction of highways. A tax commission and purchasing agency were established to combat overspending in the state government. In 1931, a bill legalizing pari-mutuel betting was passed despite Carlton's veto. Despite this, the legislature nullified it by a margin of one state senator's vote as many members of the state legislature were desperate for more income for the state.

== Post-gubernatorial political career and life ==
In 1936, Governor Carlton ran for the Democratic nomination for U.S. Senator. Although he was endorsed by the Democratic executive committee and most state newspapers, Charles O. Andrews lined up a powerful bloc of forces opposed to Carlton, and by a margin of 67,387 votes to 62,530 votes defeated Carlton in the primary of August 11, 1936.

=== Eisenhower administration ===
President Eisenhower appointed Carlton as a member of the Commission on Civil Rights in December 1957 and Carlton served until 1961. After leaving the Commission on Civil Rights, he served as a member of the National Agricultural Advisory Commission starting in 1961 and leaving the advisory commission in 1963.

== Personal life ==
On July 30, 1912, Carlton married Nell Ray in Tampa. They had three children, Martha Katharine Carlton Ward, Mary Ellen Carlton Ott, and Doyle Elam Carlton, Jr., all of whom are deceased. The latter served as a state senator and ran for Governor of Florida in 1960, but was defeated in the Democratic primary run-off election by C. Farris Bryant.

== Death ==
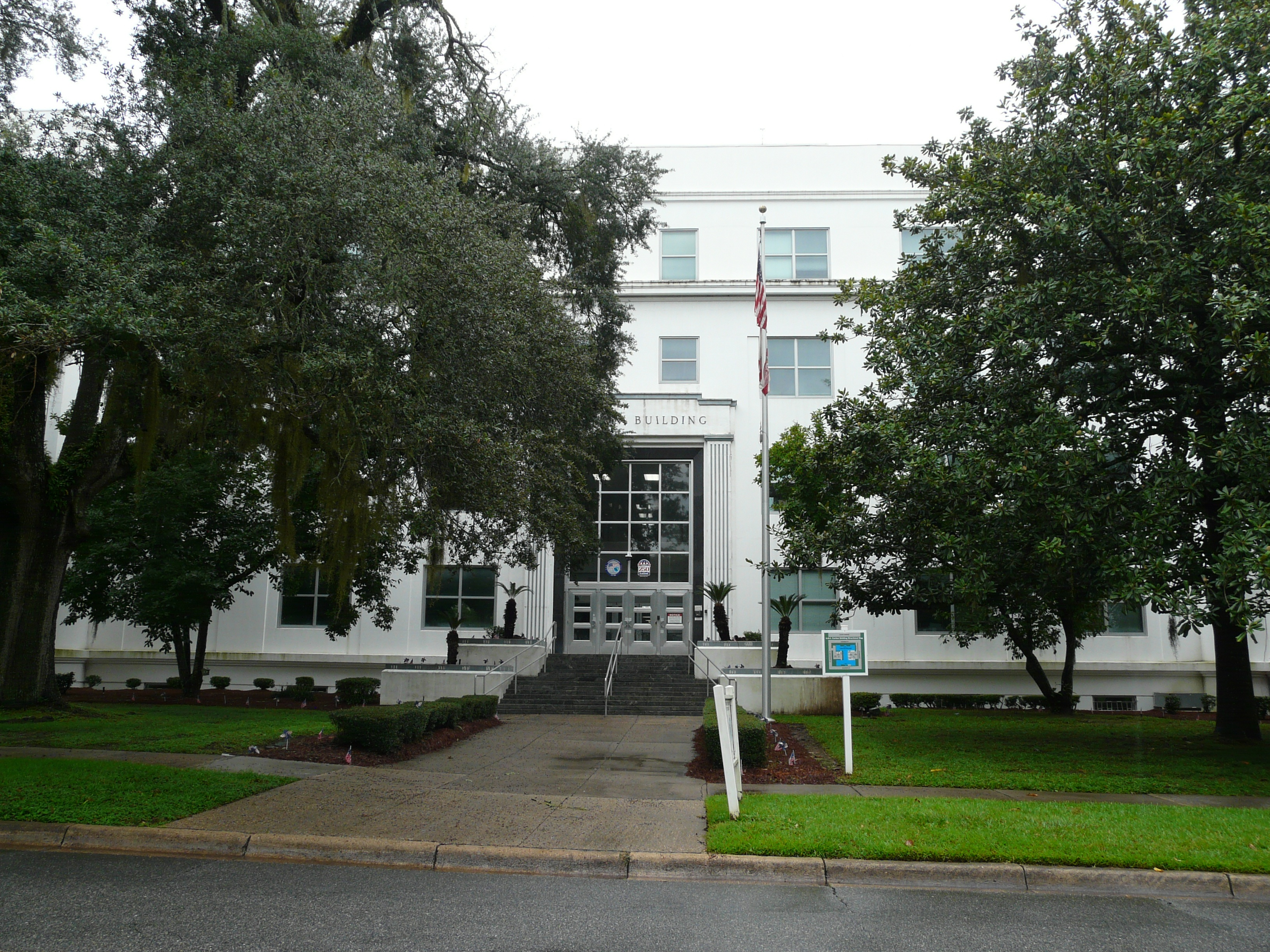
The Carlton Building in Tallahassee, Florida

He died in Tampa in 1972 and was buried at Myrtle Hill Memorial Park in Tampa.

Party political offices
Preceded by John W. Martin	Democratic nominee for Governor of Florida; 1928	Succeeded by David Sholtz
Political offices
Preceded by John W. Martin	Governor of Florida; January 8, 1929 – January 3, 1933	Succeeded by David Sholtz
