= William John Howey =

American politician

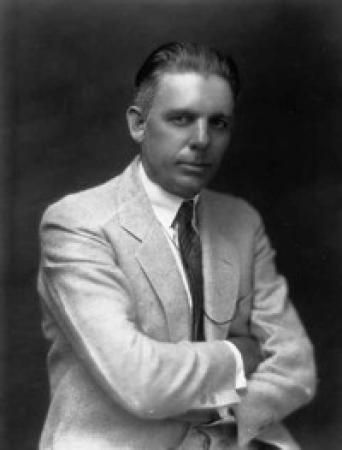

Personal details
- Born: January 19, 1876 Odin, Illinois, U.S.
- Died: June 7, 1938 (aged 62)
- Party: Republican
- Spouse: Mary Grace Hastings (m. 1914)

William John Howey (January 19, 1876 – June 7, 1938) was an American real-estate developer, citrus grower and Republican politician from Florida. He founded and served as mayor for the town of Howey-in-the-Hills, Florida. He developed and sold citrus groves, becoming one of Florida's greatest citrus developers. He opened Florida's first citrus juice plant. He ran twice for governor. A former home near Lake Wales, Florida became the site of Florida's Bok Tower at the Bok Tower Gardens.

== Early life ==
Howey was born in Odin, Illinois on January 19, 1876. His father was United Brethren minister named William Henry Howey. His mother was Mathilda Harris Howey. He attended the public schools. At age 16, he became a life insurance salesman. Sometime around 1900, he developed real estate in Oklahoma. He briefly tried manufacturing automobiles in Kansas City, but returned to real estate in 1905. He sold pineapple plantations near Perez, Mexico until the political situation became unfavorable in 1907.

== Florida citrus grower and developer ==
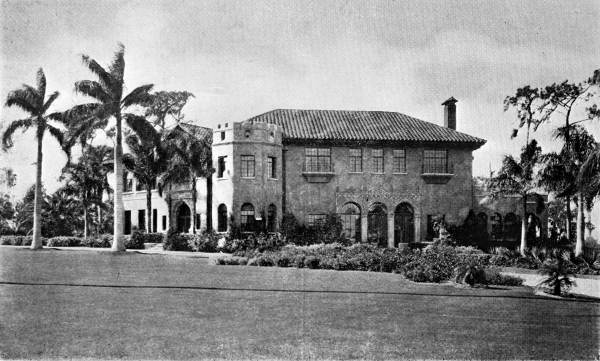
William John Howey mansion (1925)

He then moved to Florida near Winter Haven, where he sold citrus groves near what are now Dundee, Lake Hamilton and Star Lake. After a time, he moved his operations to Lake County, Florida at the behest of Lake County Sheriff Balton A. Cassidy and Harry Duncan. By 1920, he held 60,000 acres (240 km^{2}). He purchased land for about $10.00 an acre, developed it into citrus groves, and resold it for $800 to $2000 an acre. If the buyer purchased a maintenance contract, Howey guaranteed the investment plus interest within certain time constraints. In 1917, he opened the Bougainvillea Hotel to house potential investors, and in 1924 he replaced it with the Hotel Floridian on Little Lake Harris.

In 1925, Howey-in-the-Hills was incorporated and Howey became its mayor. That same year, he built the Mediterranean Revival mansion known as Howey House in the town. Howey's businesses continued to do well, both selling citrus from his holdings and selling groves to investors. He opened the state's first plant to bottle citrus juice in 1926. He was one of the first to pasteurize fruit juice and experimented with large scale vacuum storage of fruit. Later that year, the Florida land boom collapsed. Although sales plummeted, his companies continued to make a profit. However, the stock market collapse in 1929, the discovery of the Mediterranean fruit fly and hurricanes in the later 1920s heralded the decline of his businesses. His land sales and citrus holdings eventually lost money during the Depression. After his death, the Supreme Court deemed his real estate sales/maintenance contracts illegal as an "unregistered security."

== Political career ==
In 1928, Howey and his political associates sought to make the Florida Republican Party more attractive to white voters. The "lily white" Republicans nominated Howey to run for governor in 1928. His platform included reducing taxes and cutting government expenses. He accused the Democrats of institutional corruption, mismanagement, and maintaining a one-party political system in Florida. He also counted on riding Herbert Hoover's coattails into office and hoped to win support from "Hoovercrats," Florida Democrats who were unhappy with Democratic presidential nominee Al Smith. Republicans adopted the slogan, "Hoover, Howey, and Happiness." His best efforts, however came to nought, and he lost by a landslide to Doyle Carlton.

After the 1928 elections, Howey was the most well known Republican politician in Florida. He continued to serve as Howey-in-the-Hills's mayor until 1936. In 1930, he was one of few Republican Floridians to hold elected office, and he attempted unsuccessfully in 1930 to secure control of his fractured party. In 1932, he was drafted to run for governor against David Sholtz. His platform was largely the same as in 1928 with the addition of a plank that sought an elimination of the poll tax, a lynch pin in the disenfranchisement of African-American voters. This bid for office was also unsuccessful, as he lacked a cohesive Republican party, was unable to appeal to white voters, and faced a unified Democratic Party and a deepening Depression.

Howey was an Elk and a member of the Knights of Pythias. He served as a director of the Florida Citrus Exchange and was a member of the State Chamber of Commerce. On April 14, 1914, he married Mary Grace Hastings. They had two children. Howey died on June 7, 1938.

Party political offices
Preceded by William R. O'Neal	Republican nominee for Governor of Florida; 1928, 1932	Succeeded by E. E. Callaway
