= Harry C. Duncan House =

Historic house in Florida, United States

- U.S. National Register of Historic Places
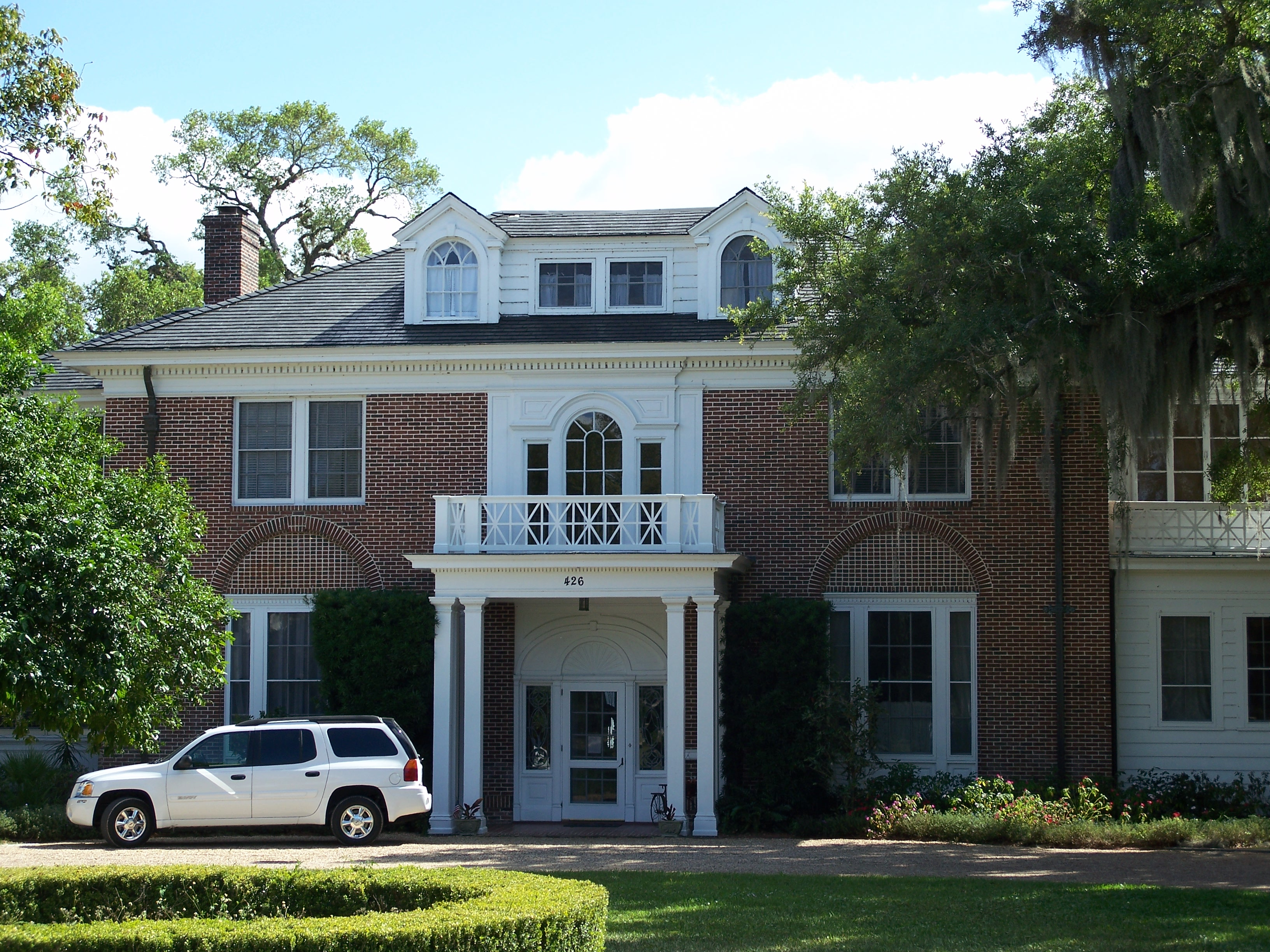

- Location within Florida Location within the United States
- Location: Tavares, Florida
- Coordinates: 28°48′4″N 81°43′22″W
- NRHP reference No.: 97000860
- Added to NRHP: August 8, 1997

The Duncan House, or Harry C. Duncan House, is a historic home in Tavares, Florida, United States. It is located at 426 Lake Dora Drive. On August 8, 1997, it was added to the U.S. National Register of Historic Places. The home is notable as an example of the Colonial Revival style of architecture and was designed by Katharine Cotheal Budd, the first woman to be granted membership in the New York chapter of the American Institute of Architects (Allaback 2008, p. 58).

Built in 1925, the house was used as an event venue, set location, bed and breakfast and private residence.
