= Charles Joseph Fiscus =

American pioneer artist (1778–1885)

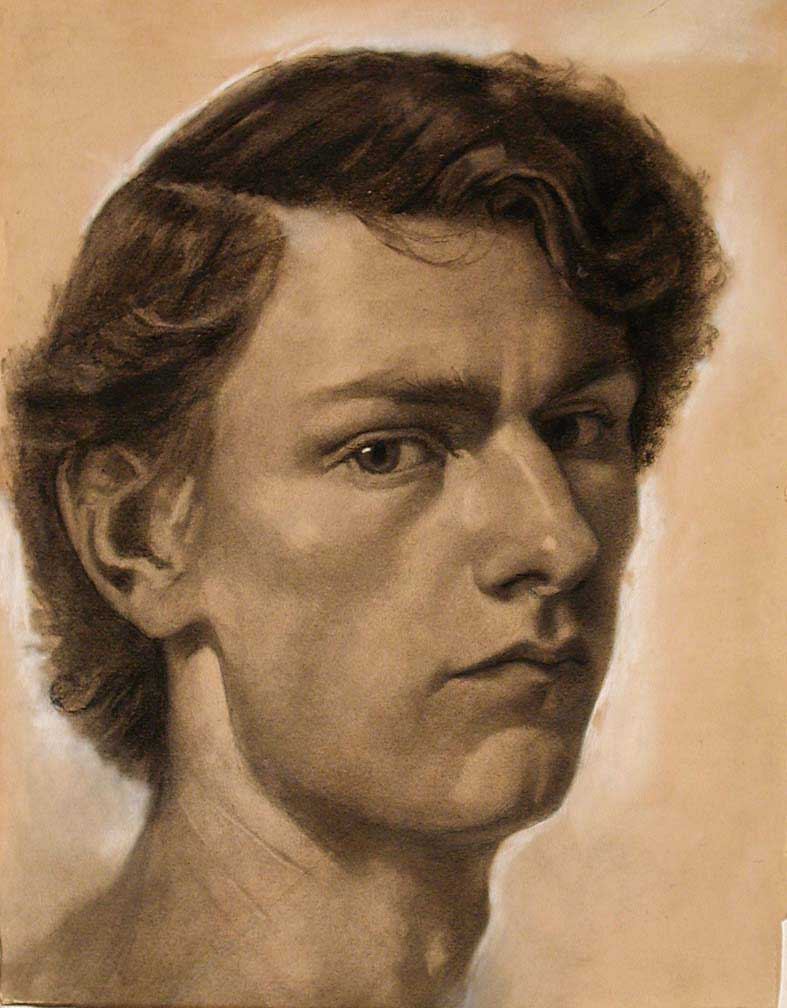
- Self-portrait
- Born: May 26, 1861; Indianapolis, Indiana, U.S.
- Died: February 6, 1884 (aged 22); Indianapolis, Indiana, U.S.
- Resting place: Crown Hill Cemetery
- Education: Indiana School of Art
- Occupation: Artist

Charles Joseph Fiscus (1861–1884), also known as C. J. Fiscus and Chas Fiscus, was a pioneer American artist who specialized in landscapes, portraits, and still life, and played an important role in early Indiana art.

== Life and career ==
Fiscus was born in Indianapolis, Indiana, on May 26, 1861. It was a tumultuous time in American history. The American Civil War had just started on April 12, 1861, and, like the rest of the nation, Indiana was swept up in war fervor. Fiscus was the son of Thomas W. Fiscus (1832–1889), a brick mason, and Elizabeth Jennie Fiscus (1834–1920), a homemaker and dressmaker.

While the Civil War devastated some Indiana families due to political differences, deaths, and/or long separations, it appears this was not the case for the young Fiscus family. For the first two years of the war, Thomas Fiscus continued working uninterrupted at his trade and only experienced two relatively short interruptions for military service during the last two years of the war when he responded to Governor Oliver Perry Morton's calls for additional soldiers. By the time the Civil War had ended on April 9, 1865, the Fiscus family was residing at 280 East St. Clair Street in the home where Fiscus would spend not only his formative years but much of the remainder of his life.

=== Indiana School of Art (1877–1879) ===
Following the Civil War, Indianapolis continued to expand under the governorships of Conrad Baker and Thomas Andrews Hendricks. Native Hoosiers James Farrington Gookins and John Washington Love were both accomplished artists who had trained professional both domestically and in Europe. By 1877, the two men were in Indianapolis and shared a vision of making the growing city a western art hub. To help realize their vision, Gookins and Love rented the third floor of what was then known as the Fletcher & Sharpe Block, on the southwest corner of Washington and Pennsylvania streets. On October 15, 1877, they opened the doors to the Indiana School of Art (ISA). For $10 per month students were promised, "Neither pains nor expense spared to give pupils the most thorough and practical knowledge of principals and methods of art work."

Fiscus became one of the early students at the ISA where he could take courses in drawing from love (freehand, perspective, and artistic anatomy) and courses from Gookins in painting (figure, landscape, and decorative painting in oil and watercolor) in the 11 rooms of the school. Fiscus learned artistic techniques alongside other talented students such as William Forsyth, who would later gain fame as one-fifth of the Hoosier Group of artists. Fiscus thrived at the institution, "Charles Fiscus was among the most talented pupils of this early school. He was marked 'first' by the master more often than not and is still remembered by his fellow-students as having unusual ability."

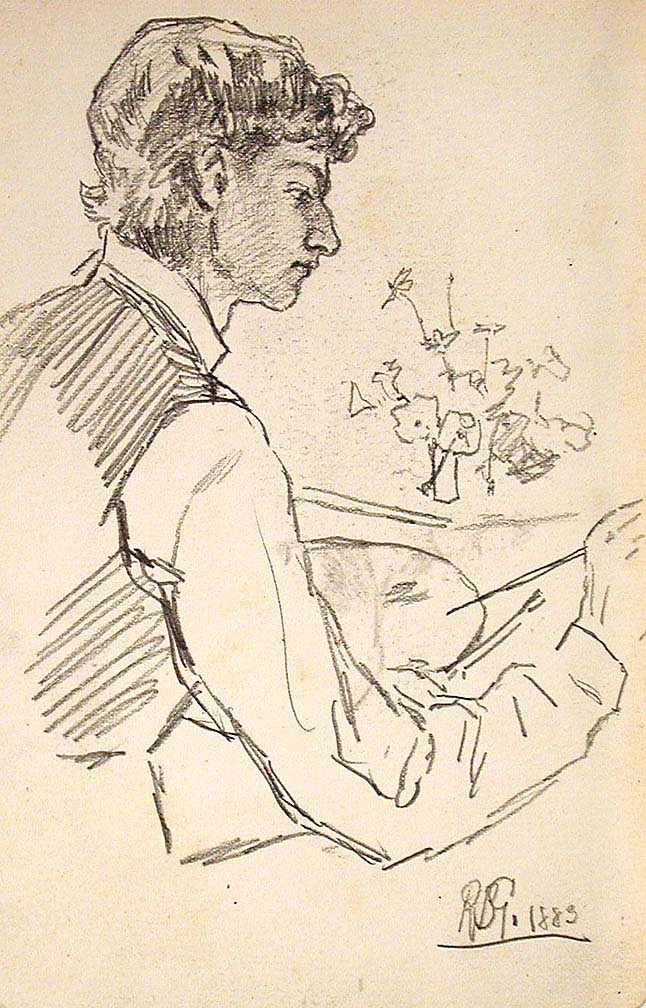
A Portrait of C.J. Fiscus at work by friend and fellow artist, Richard Buckner Gruelle

=== Indiana Art Association ===
Being a student at the ISA allowed Fiscus to hone his skills as an artist and as an exhibitor. After holding two successful three-week public exhibits of faculty and student work, a bigger, bolder exhibit that included works by artists from around the world was planned for the ISA.

On May 7, 1878, the newly formed Indiana Art Association (IAA), under the direction of the ISA, opened its First Quarterly Exhibition at the school. Fiscus displayed eight crayon drawings at the show: #247: "Apollo Belvidere" (bust), #248: "Farnese Hercules", #249: "Apollo Belvidere" (Figure), #250: "An Arm", #251: "Study from Life", #252: "Study from Life", #253: "William" (A Life Study), #254: "A Composition", alongside the works of accomplished artists such as Jacob Cox, Otto Sommer, Alfred Thompson Bricher, William Forsyth, and another future one-fifth of the Hoosier Group, Theodore Clement (T.C.) Steele.

=== The Bohemian Club ===
As late as 1879, many Hoosiers were still feeling the effects of the Panic of 1873, and the economic depression it triggered. Money was tight and funding for the arts was not a top priority for the citizens of Indianapolis. As a result, the ISA quickly declined. In response, Fiscus and six other artists: William Forsyth, William Ebbert, Frederick A. Hetherington, Thomas E. Hibben, Charles Nicolai, and Frank Edwin Scott formed the Bohemian (Bohé) Club and rented courtyard rooms at the Fletcher & Sharpe Block location. The club was a place for artists to socialize and continue honing their artistic skills. Forsyth later wrote of the club, "There were no officers of any kind. It lived up to its name in every way—[We] talked, sang, played cards and pranks, was fused with enthusiasm, and incidentally drew, painted, and etched, and was much given to long excursions into the country where most of its real work was done." Later that same year, much to the chagrin of the remaining students and faculty, the ISA was forced to permanently close its doors due to lack of funding and waning interest.

The new decade brought new adventures, challenges, and hardships for Fiscus. On June 24, 1880, John Love died at the age of 27 due to inflammation of the stomach. The Bohé Club members served as pallbearers for their former teacher, mentor, and friend. Whether the result of, or just a coincidence, the Love's death seemed to signal an exodus of artists from Indianapolis. In the fall of 1880, T. C. Steele, John Ottis Adams, and Samuel Richards migrated to Germany for continental training. Around the same period, the entrepreneurially-minded Gookins left Indianapolis to open a studio in Terre Haute, Indiana. Fiscus chose to follow his teacher and mentor to Terre Haute to continue his artistic studies and to make an excursion to Chicago. However, Fiscus returned to Indianapolis in a short time to start down his own artistic path.

=== Fiscus and Scott ===
Back home again in Indianapolis and inspired by the art and entrepreneurship of Gookins, Fiscus was confident enough in his artistic abilities to hang up his shingle. The 1880 edition of Polk's Indianapolis City Directory listed a new business that year: Fiscus and Scott, artists, located at 69 Fletcher & Sharpe Block. The business was a joint venture between the 19-year-old Fiscus and his fellow Bohemian, 17-year-old Scott. However, the business was short lived because Scott had applied to the Art Students' League in New York City and was accepted in 1881. Scott went to Paris in 1882, where he eventually gained notoriety as an artist in Europe before gaining worldwide attention.

Undeterred by his friend's departure, Fiscus carried on alone. Even though there was less competition in Indianapolis, working as an artist without a patron was challenging nevertheless, Fiscus eked out a meager living drawing crayon portraits and selling an occasional sketch over the next three years. From 1881 to 1884, Polk's Indianapolis City Directory listed Fiscus as a solo artist residing at 280 East St. Clair Street.

=== National Academy of Design ===
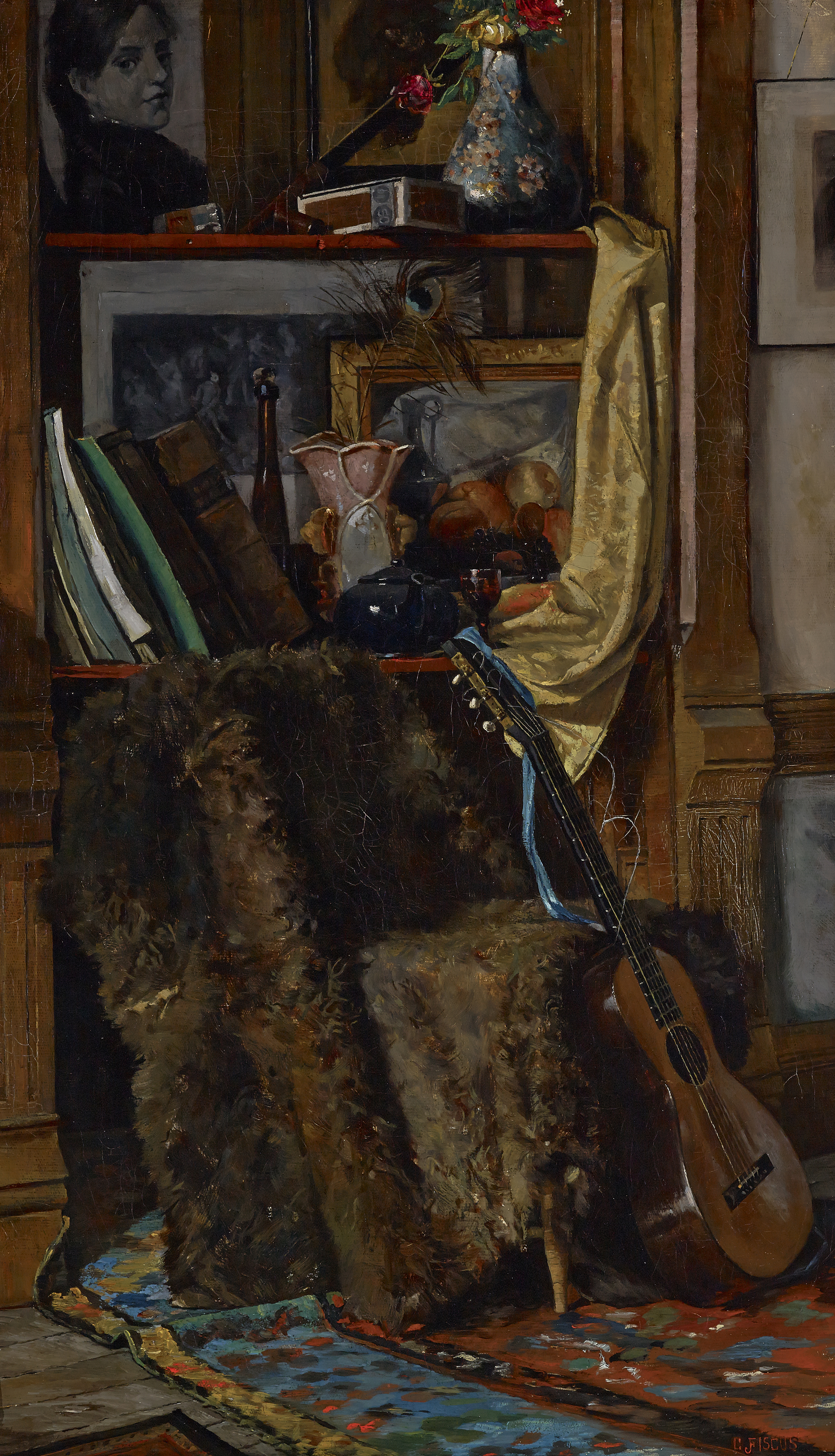
"The Bachelor Boudoir (Corner of the Studio)" by Fiscus

As a professional artist, Fiscus reached his pinnacle in 1883. The National Academy of Design in New York held its Fifty-Eighth Annual Exhibition from April 2 to May 12, 1883.

Fiscus had two pieces in the show: #320: "A Still Life" (priced at $50) hung in the South Gallery and #495: "The Bachelor Boudoir (Corner of the Studio)" (priced at $100) hung in the North-West Gallery. Fiscus shared the spotlight with artists such as Thomas Moran, Henry Bacon, and Harry Chase. As art critic Charles McMeen Kurtz stated that year, “The Spring exhibition of the National Academy of Design is the representative American annual Art exhibition, and is a fair index to the condition of Art in this country.”

=== Art Association of Indianapolis ===
During that same period, May Wright Sewall led a group effort to promote art appreciation and education in Indianapolis. The result was the formation of the Art Association of Indianapolis (AAI) on May 7, 1883. To help achieve their objectives, the AAI held its first international exhibit at the English Hotel, then located on the of intersection of Monument Circle and Meridian Street, on November 7–30, 1883.

Thanks to the work of Susan Merrill Ketcham, a newly elected director of the AAI, some of the best American and foreign artists lent their work to help support the cause. Fiscus was one of those artists. Fiscus prominently displayed two of his watercolor studies from nature alongside the work of artists such as William Merritt Chase, Hamilton Hamilton, Thomas Moran, and T. C. Steele. On the opening day of the exhibition, a reporter for the Indianapolis Journal stated, "The water-color and black-and-white departments are large. The former may be especially mentioned as containing some of the finest specimens from the most noted American artists, and as delightful and attractive work as need be desired." On the closing day the Indianapolis News declared the exhibition "an artistic success as well as a society event of the season".

=== Death ===
Winding down a productive and successful professional year, Fiscus accompanied some of his fellow artists on one of their customary sketching excursions to the country in late 1883. Fiscus spent the entire night working outdoors in the frigid Indiana weather and caught cold. After returning home, Fiscus became seriously ill. In his notes, art historian Wilbur David Peat speculated that Fiscus developed pneumonia as a result.

Fiscus died at his family's home on February 6, 1884. His obituary appeared in the Indianapolis News the afternoon of his death, "FISCUS—Charles J. Fiscus, the young artist, aged 22 years 8 months and 20 days, this morning, 6th last, at 8:30 o'clock. The funeral services will be attended from the family residence, 280 East St. Clair St., Friday morning at 10 o'clock. Friends are invited". He was buried on a cold and rainy Indiana winter's day in Crown Hill Cemetery under a modest headstone.

== Legacy ==
The early works of Indiana artists such as Fiscus, the ISA, IAA, and AAI took root and started to grow in Indianapolis. Nineteen years after Fiscus' death, a retrospective and contemporary exhibition of Indiana art was held at Tomlinson Hall, then located on the northeast corner of Market and Delaware streets, from April 27 to May 9, 1903. The exhibit was organized to benefit the charitable organization, the Flower Mission, and featured 11 pieces by Fiscus alongside the works of John Love, James Gookins, Frank Scott, Jacob Cox, Dewey Bates, and the entire Hoosier Group: T. C. Steele, William Forsyth, Otto Stark, John Ottis Adams, and Richard Buckner Gruelle. Fiscus' works included "Self-Portrait", some scenes in and around Indianapolis, and various still life pieces. A reporter for the Indianapolis News stated, "The work of Charles J. Fiscus shows a wide variety of subjects and a versatility in execution."

In 1902, the AAI opened the John Herron Art Institute (JHAI) with a $225,000 estate gift it had received from Indianapolis real estate investor John Herron. The JHAI acquired most of the known works by Fiscus through gifts from Elizabeth J. Fiscus and private collectors. In 1962, the AAI officially changed its name to the Indianapolis Museum of Art (IMA). Some Fiscus pieces of note currently housed at the IMA are: "The Bachelor Boudoir (Corner of the Studio)", "Stone Cabin", "Woods", "Figures on a Lane", "University Park, Indianapolis", "White River, Broad Ripple", "Farm, Broad Ripple", "Plowed Fields, Broad Ripple", "The Old Kentucky Shore", "The Canal", "Studio Interior", and "Self-Portrait", all of which can be viewed online at the IMA's website. "The Bachelor Boudoir (Corner of the Studio)", oil on canvas, is the only known surviving oil painting by Fiscus and one of only two known surviving works done in color. "Studio Interior" was done in pen, black ink and watercolor on white paper. Other works by Fiscus of note are held in a private collection and include two pen and ink drawings: "A Dream of Elfland" and "Wide Awake", and four additional untitled drawings.

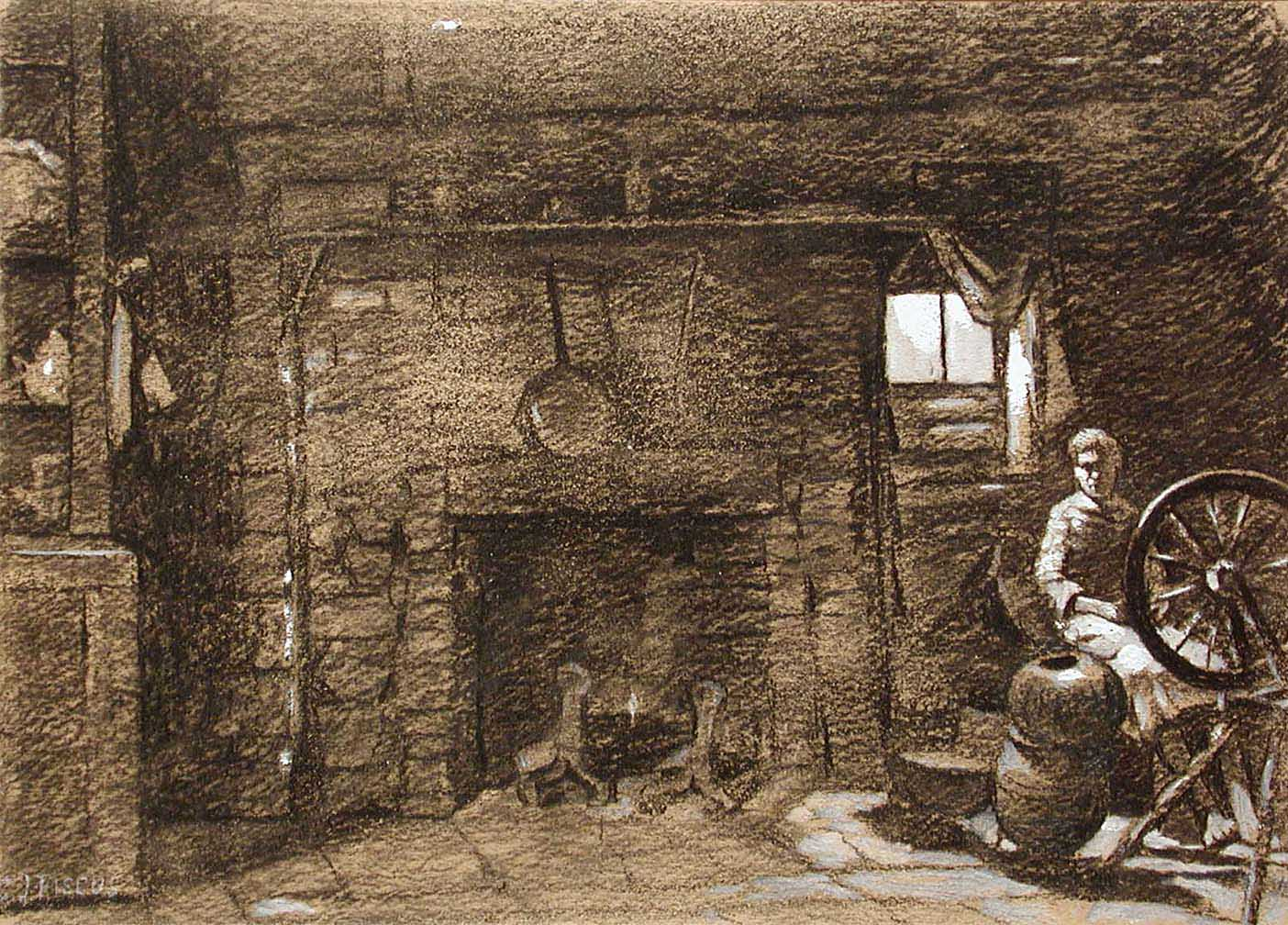
"Stone Cabin" by Fiscus

On July 8, 2014, John Martin, then professor of art history at Hanover College, offered a modern critique of Fiscus' work: "Many thoughts go through my mind as I look at Fiscus. First, the quality of his work is very high and thus his early death is an even greater tragedy. Second, in terms of style, he is a young artist experimenting to find his own particular voice. 'Stone Cabin' is very close to the Realist style of the French artist Francois Millet. However, looking at his work overall, I see a blending of realism mixed with fantasy that suggests he must have been inspired by the English Pre-Raphaelites. Most especially, compare 'A Dream of Elfand' and 'Wide Awake' to work by Richard Dadd (whose best-known work is 'The Fairy Feller's Masterstroke', c. 1864)."

The Work of C.J. Fiscus: Private Collection Gallery

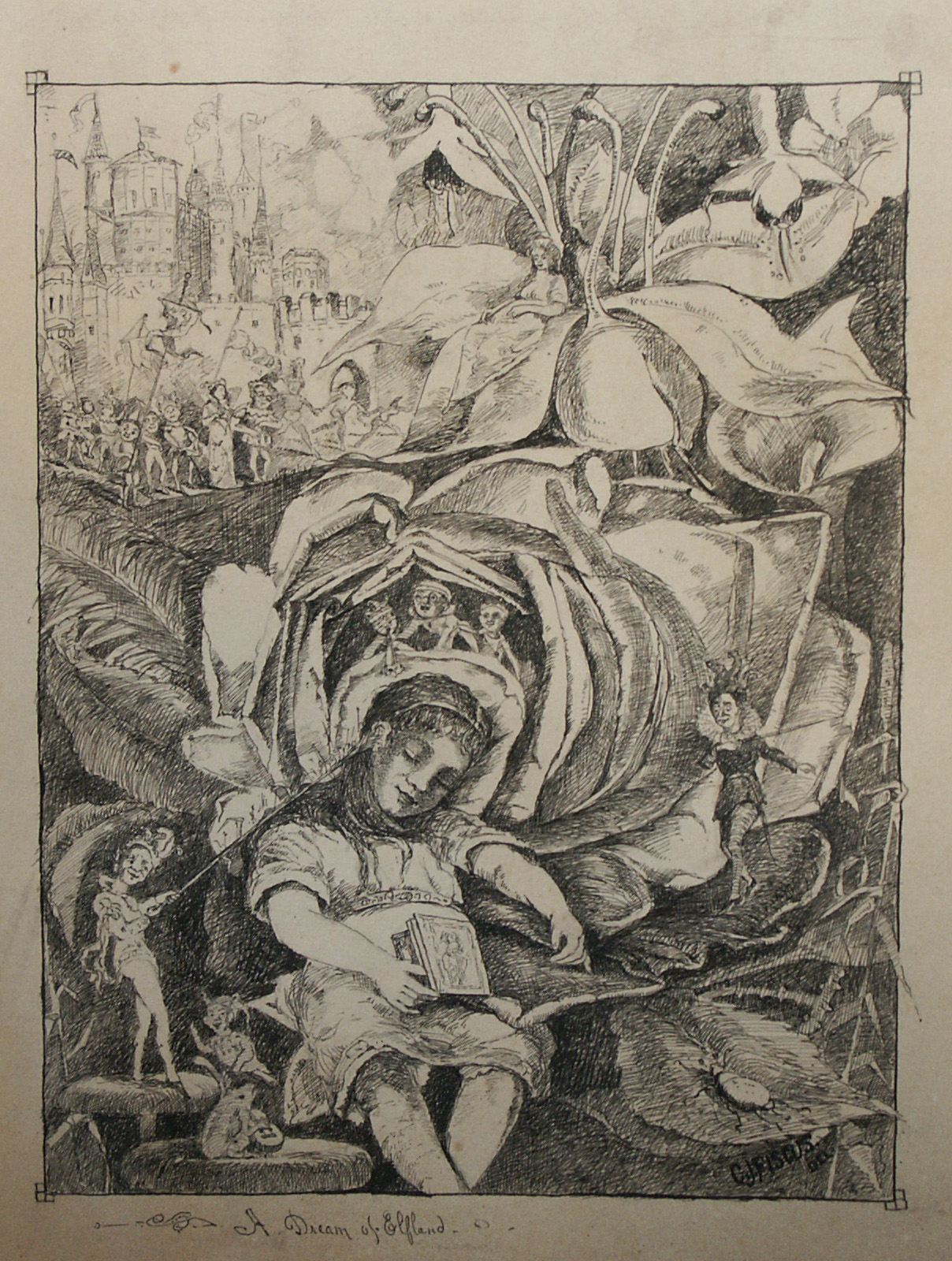
"A Dream of Elfland" by C.J. Fiscus

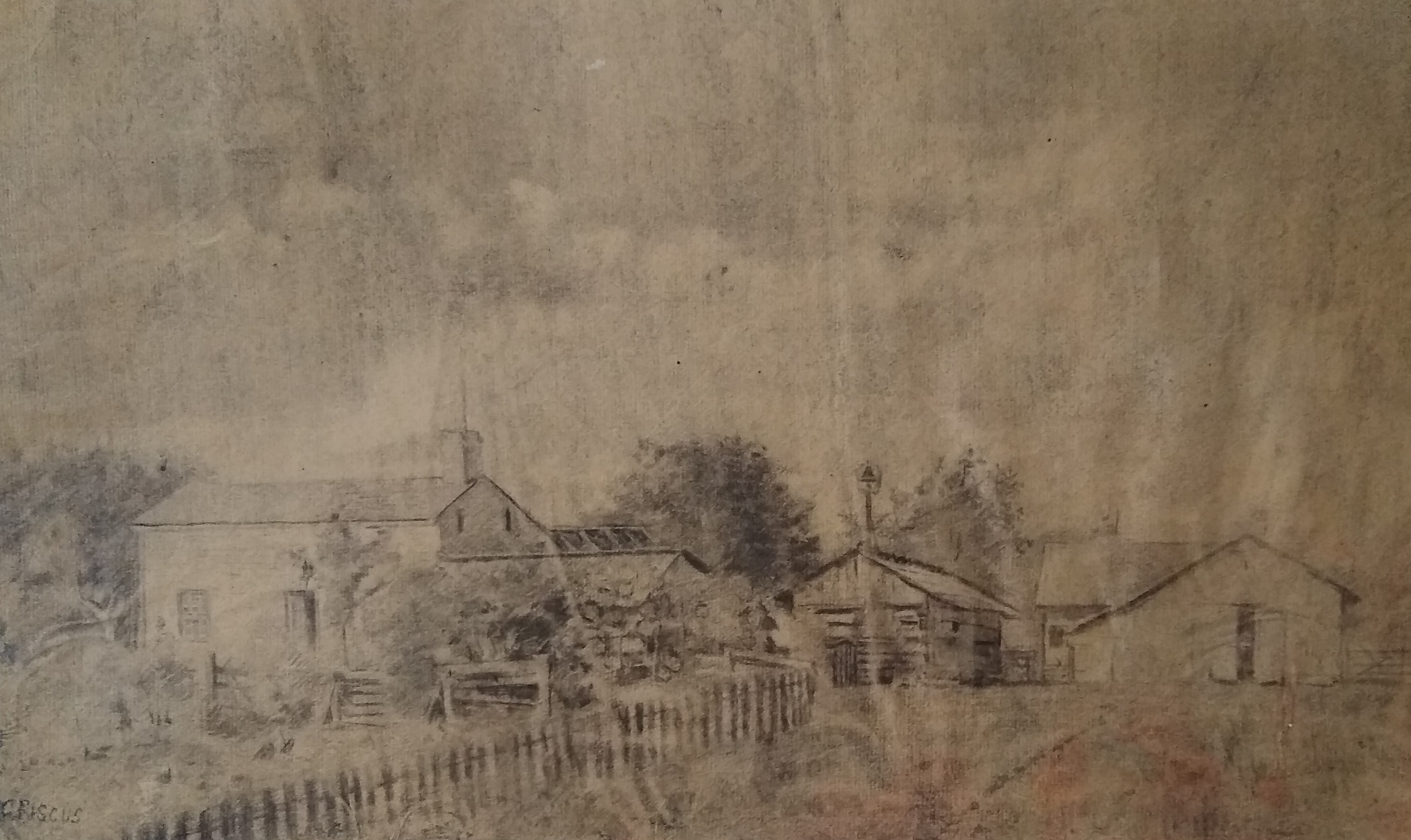
#1 Untitled Farm Scene by C.J. Fiscus

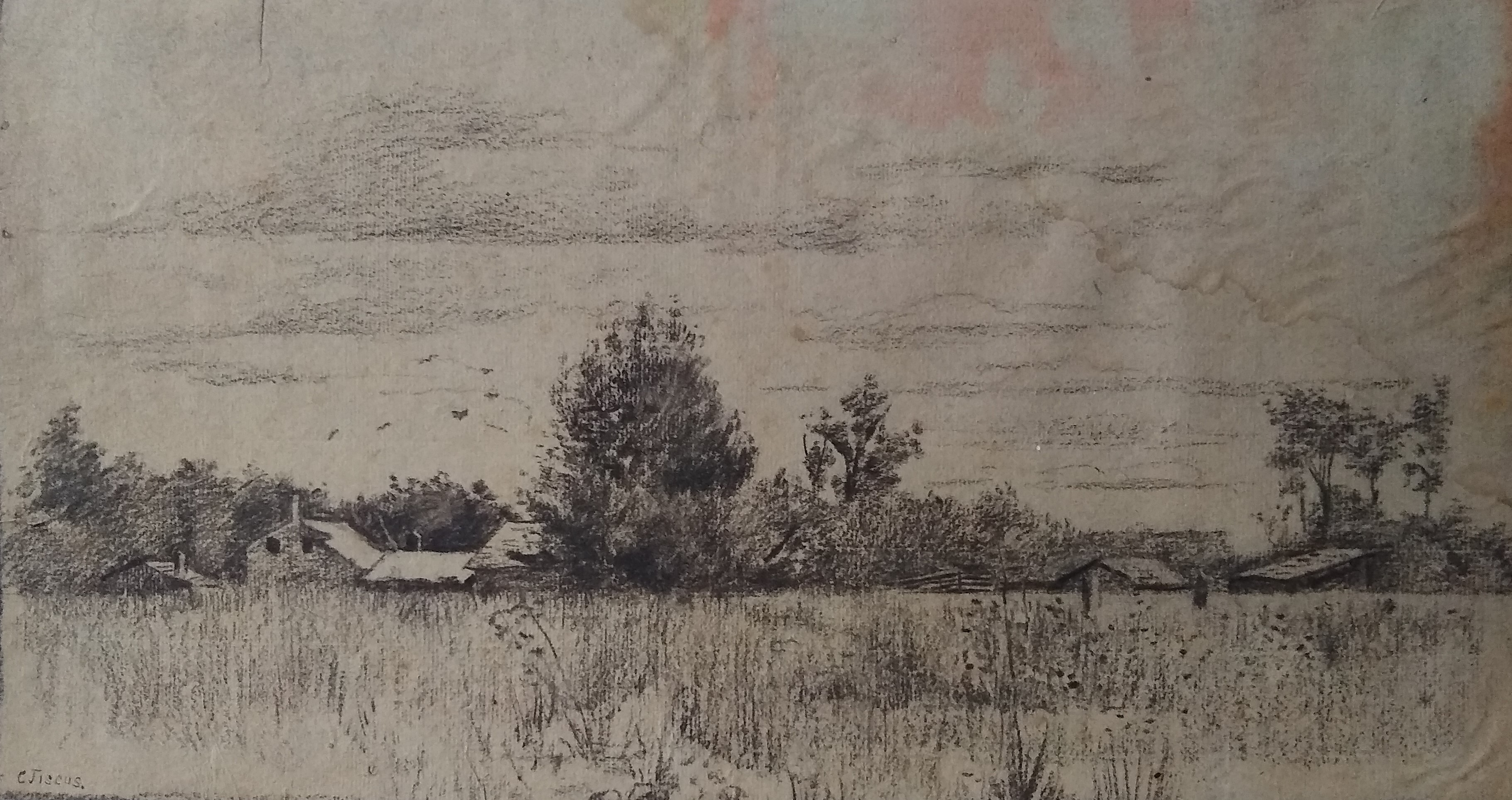
#2 Untitled Farm Scene by C.J. Fiscus

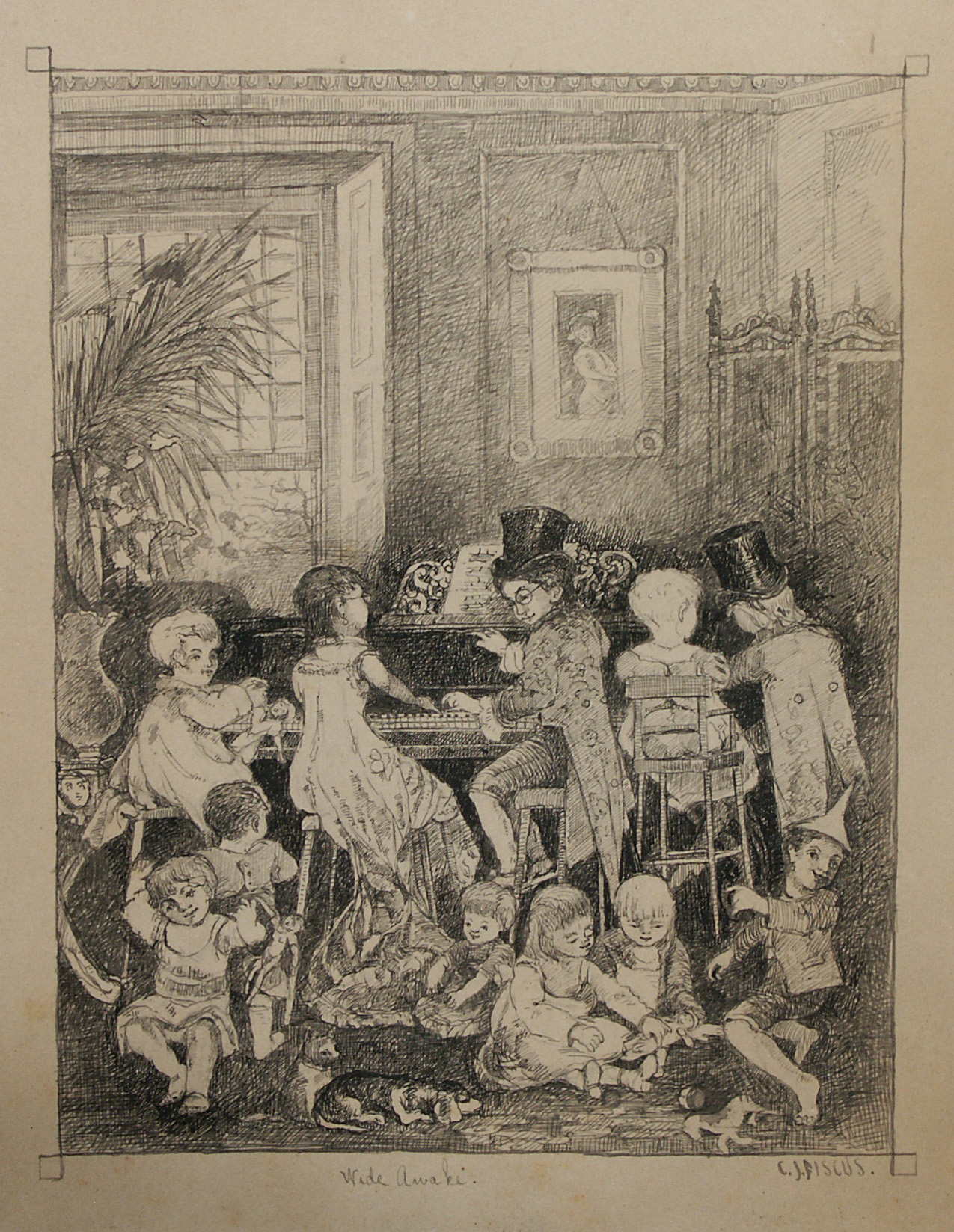
"Wide Awake" by C.J. Fiscus
