= Howey-in-the-Hills, Florida =

Town in the state of Florida, United States

- Town
- Town of Howey-in-the-Hills
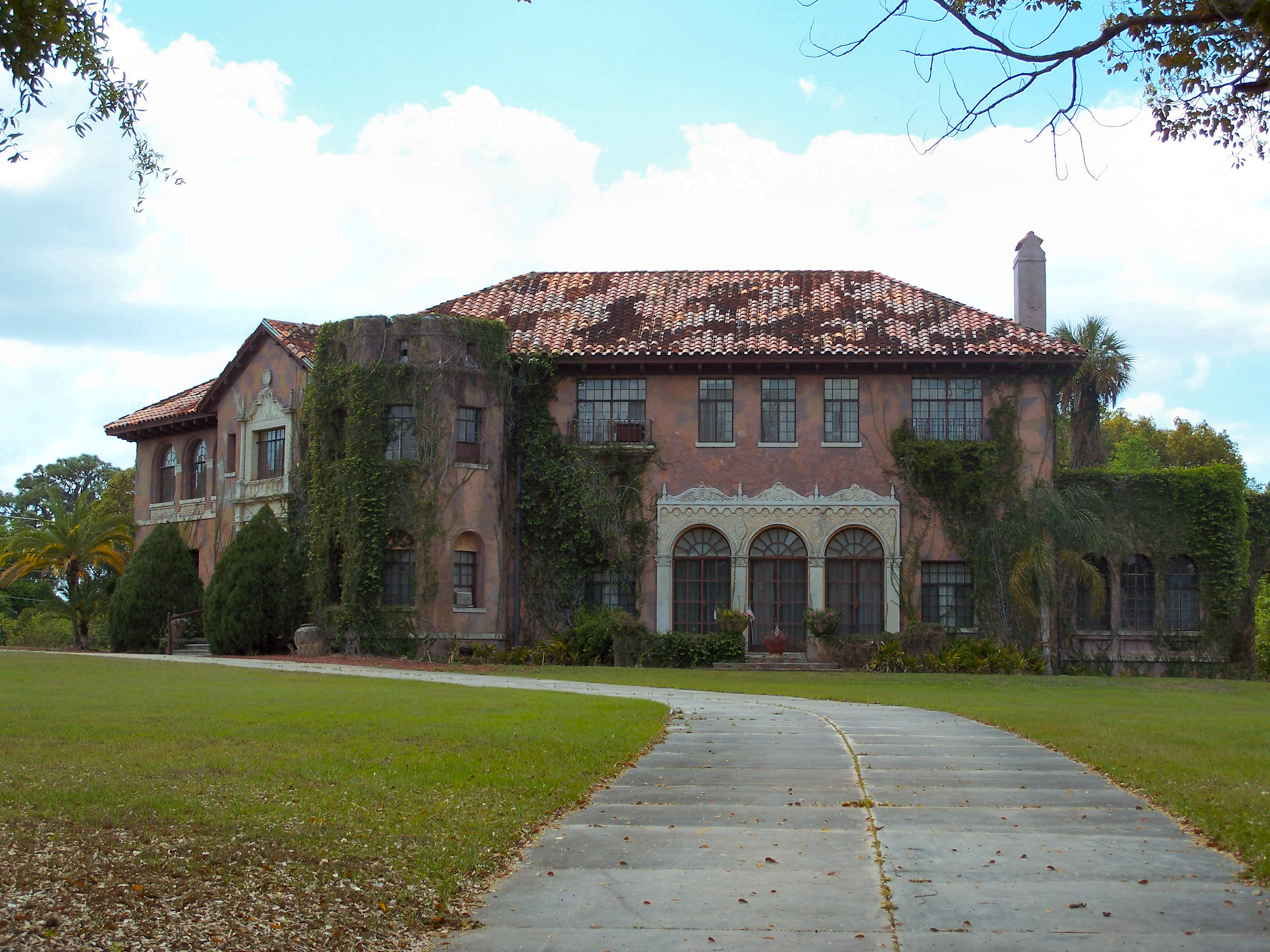
- Howey Mansion, original home of the town's founder (in 2007)

- Logo

- Location in Lake County and the state of Florida
- Coordinates: 28°42′35″N 81°46′47″W
- Country: United States
- State: Florida
- County: Lake
- Founded: 1921
- Incorporated (Town of Howey): May 8, 1925
- Incorporated (Town of Howey-in-the-Hills): 1927

Government
  - Type: Council-Manager
  - Mayor: Graham Wells
  - Mayor Pro Tem: Timothy "Tim" Everline
  - Councilors: David Miles, Jonathan Arnold, and Dr. Reneé Lannaman
  - Town Manager: Sean O'Keefe
  - Town Clerk: John M. Brock

Area
  - Total: 3.67 sq mi (9.51 km^{2})
  - Land: 3.16 sq mi (8.19 km^{2})
  - Water: 0.51 sq mi (1.32 km^{2})
- Elevation: 89 ft (27 m)

Population (2020)
  - Total: 1,643
  - Density: 520/sq mi (200.7/km^{2})
- Time zone: UTC-5 (Eastern (EST))
  - Summer (DST): UTC-4 (EDT)
- ZIP code: 34737
- Area code: 352
- FIPS code: 12-32775
- GNIS feature ID: 2405870
- Website: www.howey.org

Howey-In-The-Hills is a town in Lake County, Florida, United States. The population was 1,643 at the 2020 census. It is part of the Orlando–Kissimmee–Sanford Metropolitan Statistical Area.

== History ==
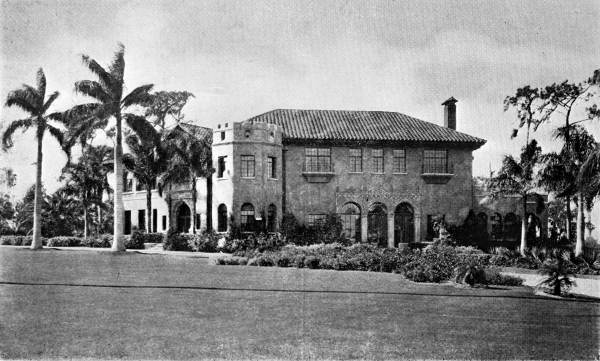
William John Howey's mansion (in 1925)

Howey-in-the-Hills was founded by William John Howey, a citrus grower and real-estate developer who began to plat his land near Lake Harris for housing development in 1921. On May 8, 1925, it was officially incorporated as the Town of Howey, and served as its first mayor. In 1927, the name of the municipality was officially changed to the Town of Howey-in-the-Hills, to reflect the location of the town in an area of rolling hills, which he nicknamed "The Florida Alps".

The first citrus juice factory in Florida was built in Howey-in-the-Hills by William John Howey in 1921.

== Geography ==
The community sits on the west shore of Little Lake Harris, an arm of Lake Harris. The town is bordered to the northwest by the unincorporated community of Yalaha.

Florida State Road 19 passes through the town, and is locally known as Palm Avenue. It leads north across Little Lake Harris and leads 8 miles (13 km) to Tavares, the Lake county seat. To the south SR 19 leads 13 miles (21 km) to Groveland.

According to the United States Census Bureau, Howey-in-the-Hills has a total area of 3.7 square miles (9.5 km^{2}), of which 3.2 square miles (8.2 km^{2}) are land and 0.50 square miles (1.3 km^{2}), or 13.9%, are water.

=== Climate ===
The climate in this area is characterized by hot, humid summers and generally mild winters. According to the Köppen climate classification, the Town of Howey-in-the-Hills has a humid subtropical climate zone (Cfa).

== Demographics ==
Historical population
Census	Pop.	Note	%±
1930	338		—
1940	203		−39.9%
1950	188		−7.4%
1960	402		113.8%
1970	466		15.9%
1980	626		34.3%
1990	724		15.7%
2000	956		32.0%
2010	1,098		14.9%
2020	1,643		49.6%
U.S. Decennial Census

=== Racial and ethnic composition ===
Howey-in-the-Hills racial composition (Hispanics excluded from racial categories) (NH = Non-Hispanic)
Race	Pop 2010	Pop 2020	% 2010	% 2020
White (NH)	1,006	1,261	91.62%	76.75%
Black or African American (NH)	14	94	1.28%	5.72%
Native American or Alaska Native (NH)	0	8	0.00%	0.49%
Asian (NH)	6	15	0.55%	0.91%
Pacific Islander or Native Hawaiian (NH)	0	0	0.00%	0.00%
Some other race (NH)	0	5	0.00%	0.30%
Two or more races/Multiracial (NH)	11	36	1.00%	2.19%
Hispanic or Latino (any race)	61	224	5.56%	13.63%
Total	1,098	1,643		

=== 2020 census ===
As of the 2020 census, Howey-in-the-Hills had a population of 1,643. The median age was 48.6 years. 17.5% of residents were under the age of 18 and 24.3% of residents were 65 years of age or older. For every 100 females there were 101.6 males, and for every 100 females age 18 and over there were 100.4 males age 18 and over.

92.0% of residents lived in urban areas, while 8.0% lived in rural areas.

There were 673 households in Howey-in-the-Hills, of which 27.6% had children under the age of 18 living in them. Of all households, 60.9% were married-couple households, 14.6% were households with a male householder and no spouse or partner present, and 17.5% were households with a female householder and no spouse or partner present. About 19.1% of all households were made up of individuals and 10.1% had someone living alone who was 65 years of age or older.

There were 769 housing units, of which 12.5% were vacant. The homeowner vacancy rate was 4.2% and the rental vacancy rate was 9.4%.

According to the 2020 American Community Survey 5-year estimates, there were 547 families residing in the town.

=== 2010 census ===
As of the 2010 United States census, there were 1,098 people, 484 households, and 336 families residing in the town.

=== 2000 census ===
As of the census of 2000, there were 956 people, 385 households, and 291 families residing in the town. The population density was 540.6 inhabitants per square mile (208.7/km^{2}). There were 450 housing units at an average density of 254.5 per square mile (98.3/km^{2}). The racial makeup of the town was 96.97% White, 0.52% African American, 0.21% Native American, 0.73% Asian, 0.21% from other races, and 1.36% from two or more races. Hispanic or Latino of any race were 2.20% of the population.

In 2000, there were 385 households, out of which 27.8% had children under the age of 18 living with them, 64.9% were married couples living together, 7.8% had a female householder with no husband present, and 24.4% were non-families. 18.4% of all households were made up of individuals, and 8.3% had someone living alone who was 65 years of age or older. The average household size was 2.48 and the average family size was 2.80.

In 2000, in the town, the population was spread out, with 20.7% under the age of 18, 4.5% from 18 to 24, 24.2% from 25 to 44, 29.0% from 45 to 64, and 21.7% who were 65 years of age or older. The median age was 45 years. For every 100 females, there were 98.8 males. For every 100 females age 18 and over, there were 99.5 males.

In 2000, the median income for a household in the town was $49,327, and the median income for a family was $51,458. Males had a median income of $39,773 versus $27,727 for females. The per capita income for the town was $23,273. About 3.4% of families and 5.7% of the population were below the poverty line, including 9.5% of those under age 18 and 2.2% of those age 65 or over.

== See also ==
- SEC v. W. J. Howey Co. — a United States Supreme Court case establishing the scope of the Securities Act of 1933. The securities at issue were investments in orange groves in Howey-in-the-Hills.
