= Zella de Milhau =

American artist, ambulance driver, community organizer and motorcycle policewoman

- Born: 1870; Manhattan, New York, United States
- Died: March 5, 1954 (aged 83–84); Southampton, New York, United States
- Awards: Croix de guerre Medal of French Gratitude

Zella de Milhau (1866–1954) was an American artist, ambulance driver, community organizer and motorcycle policewoman. Milhau was instrumental in organizing Block Beautiful, a 1902 neighborhood beautification program in Brooklyn, New York. As an artist she was known for her etchings, which are included in several museum collections. During World War I she went to England to volunteer, and was appointed a recruiting sergeant in the Volunteer Training Corps. She later raised community funds in Southampton to purchase an ambulance, which she equipped and drove in France between the front line and hospitals. She received the Croix de guerre and the Medal of French Gratitude from the French government for her service. On her return to Southampton, she was briefly the area's first motorcycle police officer.

== Biography ==
Zella de Milhau was born in 1866 in NoHo, New York in Manhattan, in the Colonnade Row buildings on Lafayette Street. Her parents operated a successful drug store in Manhattan. Her first experience of art education was at the Art Students League of New York.

In 1896 she was reported to have a studio in New York, and to be doing pen and ink drawings for periodicals. Her work appeared in 1891 in The Decorator and Furnisher and in 1895 in the Monthly Illustrator, By 1898 she had moved to 291 Henry Street in Brooklyn; she appeared in that year's social register. It was on Henry street in 1902 that she spearheaded an early effort for urban beautification called Block Beautiful. As part of an effort to bring more trees and plants to the neighborhood, she organized her neighbors to participate. The New York Times wrote in 1997 that she convinced her neighbors to "add window boxes, plant trees, install greenery and take back the rear yards from laundry poles and hard-packed earth. She assembled standard designs for window boxes, and lined up florists, nurserymen and carpenters, most of whom were reluctant to take on such small jobs."

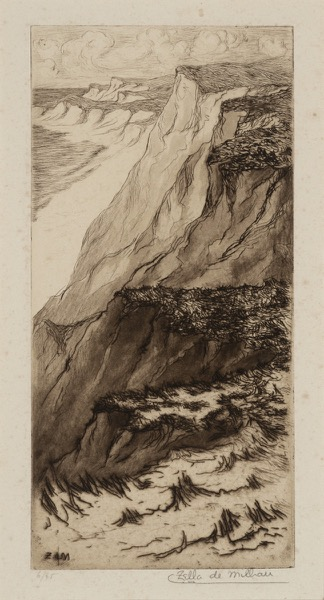
Montauk Bluffs, by Zella de Milhau (1920)

=== Move to Southampton ===
De Milhau was a frequent visitor to Southampton, where she also attended the Shinnecock Hills Summer School of Art. In 1896, she purchased one of the college's student residence houses in its Art Village, naming the property Laffalot. In 1904 she moved permanently to Southampton.

=== World War I ===
During World War I she left Southampton for England during 1914 and 1915, where she served with the O.H.M.S Volunteer Motor Corps and was appointed as a recruiting sergeant. With funds raised from the citizens of Southampton she bought an ambulance in France and drove it between the front line and hospitals. For her wartime work she received the French Croix de Guerre, the Gold Medaille de la Reconnaissance francaise, citations from three front line hospitals and the town of Verberie, France.

=== Return to Southampton ===
Upon returning to Southampton, she purchased a motorcycle and became its first motorcycle officer, "officer number 6". The New York Tribune reported in July 1920 that the "Society Girl Motor Cop" Milhau had taken the position of motorcycle policewoman, to chase speeding drivers. By September 1920, the Southampton police chief reported that Milhau would stop riding the motorcycle, and move to policing duties as a parole officer and interpreter for foreigners facing the local court.

De Milhau was the subject of the 1936 book Thank God for Laughter by Mel Erskine, the pen name of her partner, British author, Mollie Lawton.

De Milhau continued to be an accomplished printmaker upon her return to Southampton. In October 1923, The Brooklyn Museum Quarterly recorded that two of De Milhau's drypoint prints, "Sand Dunes, Long Island" and "Lowland" were recent accessions of the Brooklyn Museum.

In 1923 De Milhau submitted a colored mezzotint print to the Seventh Annual Exhibition of the Brooklyn Society of Etchers. Her print "Boats Along Shore" would to cause sea lovers to "long for the tang of its air" according to Ernest G. Draper of The Brooklyn Museum Quarterly.

== Collections ==
Her work is included in the collections of the Smithsonian American Art Museum, the Ruth and Elmer Wellin Museum of Art, Smith College, the Guild Hall of East Hampton, and the National Gallery of Art, Washington.
