= Doyle E. Carlton Jr. =

American politician

Doyle E. Carlton, Jr.
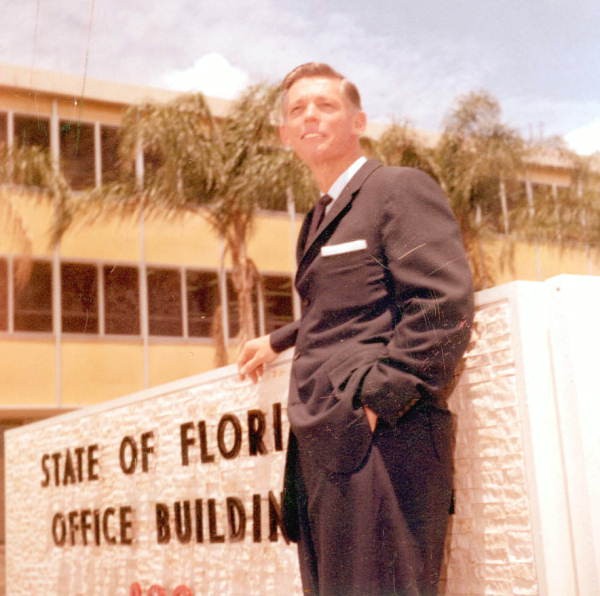

Member of the Florida Senate from the 27th district
- In office 1953–1959
- Preceded by: James W. Moore
- Succeeded by: Dick Williams
- In office 1965–1966

Personal details
- Born: Doyle Elam Carlton Jr. July 4, 1922 Tampa, Florida, U.S.
- Died: May 10, 2003 (aged 80) Wauchula, Florida, U.S.
- Party: Democratic
- Spouse: Lillian Mildred Woodbery (m. 1943)
- Children: Susan, Doyle III, Jane
- Parent(s): Doyle E. Carlton; Nell Ray Carlton
- Education: University of Florida

Doyle Elam Carlton Jr. (July 4, 1922 – May 10, 2003) was an American politician. He served as a Democratic member for the 27th district of the Florida Senate.

== Life and career ==
Carlton was born in Tampa, Florida, the son of the 25th governor of Florida, Doyle E. Carlton. He attended Henry B. Plant High School and the University of Florida. He served in the United States Air Force.

In 1953, Carlton was elected to represent the 27th district of the Florida Senate, succeeding James W. Moore. He served until 1959, when he was succeeded by Dick Williams. The next year, he was a Democratic candidate for governor of Florida. In 1965, he was re-elected to the 27th district, serving until 1966.

Carlton died in May 2003 of cancer, at the age of 80.
