= 1960 Florida gubernatorial election =

- November 8, 1960
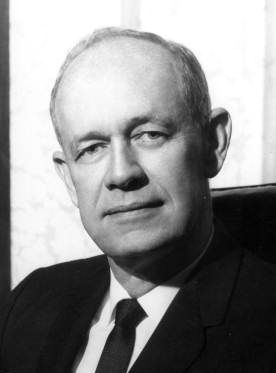

Nominee	C. Farris Bryant	George C. Petersen
Party	Democratic	Republican
Popular vote	849,407	569,936
Percentage	59.85%	40.16%
- County results Bryant: 50–60% 60–70% 70–80% 80–90% >90% Petersen: 50–60% 60–70%
Governor before election
LeRoy Collins
Democratic
Elected Governor
C. Farris Bryant
Democratic

The 1960 Florida gubernatorial election was held on November 8, 1960. Democratic nominee C. Farris Bryant defeated Republican nominee George C. Petersen with 59.85% of the vote.

== Primary elections ==
Primary elections were held on May 3, 1960.

=== Democratic primary ===
30.4% of the voting age population participated in the Democratic primary.

==== Candidates ====
- C. Farris Bryant, former State Representative
- Doyle E. Carlton Jr., State Senator
- W. Haydon Burns, Mayor of Jacksonville
- John Moore McCarty, State Senator
- Fred Dickinson, State Senator
- Thomas E. David
- Harvie J. Belser, former State Representative, State Representative
- Bill Hendrix, white supremacist
- George Downs
- Jim McCorvey

==== Results ====
Democratic Primary Runoff by county Bryant: 50–60%; 60–70%; 70–80%; 80–90%; >90%; Carlton: 50–60%; 60–70%

Democratic primary results
Party	Candidate	Votes	%
Democratic	C. Farris Bryant	193,507	20.65
Democratic	Doyle E. Carlton Jr.	186,228	19.87
Democratic	W. Haydon Burns	166,352	17.75
Democratic	John Moore McCarty	144,750	15.45
Democratic	Fred Dickinson	115,520	12.33
Democratic	Thomas E. David	80,057	8.54
Democratic	Harvie J. Belser	30,736	3.28
Democratic	Bill Hendrix	8,517	0.91
Democratic	George Downs	6,320	0.67
Democratic	Jim McCorvey	5,080	0.54
Total votes		937,067	100.00

Democratic primary runoff results
Party	Candidate	Votes	%
Democratic	C. Farris Bryant	512,757	55.21
Democratic	Doyle E. Carlton Jr.	416,052	44.79
Total votes		928,809	100.00

=== Republican primary ===
2.9% of the voting age population participated in the Republican primary.

==== Candidates ====
- George C. Petersen, incumbent Broward County Commissioner.
- Emerson Rupert, hotelier and Republican activist.

==== Results ====
Republican primary results
Party	Candidate	Votes	%
Republican	George C. Petersen	65,202	72.70
Republican	Emerson Rupert	24,484	27.30
Total votes		89,686	100.00

== General election ==
=== Candidates ===
- C. Farris Bryant, Democratic
- George C. Petersen, Republican

=== Results ===
1960 Florida gubernatorial election
Party	Candidate	Votes	%
Democratic	C. Farris Bryant	849,407	59.85%
Republican	George C. Petersen	569,936	40.16%
Majority		279,471	
Turnout		1,419,343	
Democratic hold			

== Works cited ==
- Steed, Robert; Moreland, Laurence; Baker, Tod, eds. (1980). Party Politics in the South. Praeger Publishers. ISBN 0030565863.
