= John Stansel Taylor =

American politician (1871–1936)

- Picture of Senator Taylor from Tampa Bay Library Consortium Archives
- Born: March 25, 1871; Near Largo, Florida, U.S.
- Died: August 1936 (aged 65); Largo, Florida
- Occupations: Politician, businessman
- Spouse: Flossie Campbell

John Stansel Taylor (1871–1936) was a Largo, Florida, politician, citrus grower, and businessman who served as the first State Senator from Pinellas County, Florida. He was born "six miles south of Largo" on March 21, 1871, before Largo became a municipality and when Pinellas County was still Western Hillsborough County. Taylor’s parents were among the Pinellas Peninsula's first pioneers, and he was one of the first residents to be born in the Largo area. He was one of four members of his family to serve in the State Legislature. He was one of the largest landowners in Pinellas County, owning citrus groves and a packing plant at a time when Largo was nicknamed "Citrus City." Taylor was President of the Florida Citrus Exchange and a Member of the State Citrus Commission. He has been called "the father of Pinellas County." He died in 1936. Taylor Lake Park, a Pinellas County park, was named in his honor.

== Background ==
As a child, he worked in his family's groves and packing plant. On May 2, 1901, he married Flossie Campbell. In 1903, Taylor built his citrus packing plant at the corner of Missouri Avenue and Bay Drive in Largo.

== Career ==
Taylor served as a Hillsborough County's Representative in the State Legislature from 1905 until 1910 and advocated for the separation of Pinellas from Hillsborough County. In 1911 he served as mayor of Largo and in 1913 was instrumental in making Largo the first Florida town to use a council-manager government. He continued the campaign for the separation of the Pinellas Peninsula from Hillsborough County. He lobbied the Legislature and presided at a rally in Largo where the "Pinellas Declaration of Independence" (written by St. Petersburg Times editor W. L. Straub) was read. The Legislature created Pinellas County on January 1, 1912, and Pinellas County elected Taylor to the Florida Senate in September 1912. He defeated the Socialist candidate 384 to 307.

He also served as chair of the Pinellas County Board of Commissioners from 1915 to 1923. As a commissioner he helped reform the awarding of contracts for roads construction. He advocated for construction of a county-wide road system at a time when Pinellas roads were inadequate and construction was controversial. In May 1924, he became president of the "Citrus City" Growers Association. In 1925, he became president of the Florida Senate.

The issue of evolution caused consternation among Floridians at that time, and the 1927 session of the Legislature sought to pass an "anti-evolution bill" to prohibit the teaching of evolution in public schools. Senator Taylor was a vice-president in the "Bible Crusaders of America" and a strong anti-evolutionist. He used his power as Senate President to have the Bill calendared and voted on by number only, but the Bill's opponents discovered what had been done and successfully fought its passage. In 1928, he ran unsuccessfully for governor.

In 1929, he became president of the Florida Horticultural Society. Taylor's groves and packing plant were mainstays of Largo's economy during the Great Depression. On April Fools' Day eve, 1931, the packing plant burned down. Taylor rented space from another packer and built a new plant on Seminole Boulevard at East Bay Drive, where Largo Central Park was built after the plant's demolition. His business interests included serving as president of the Bank of Clearwater. He was a director of the People's Bank of Clearwater and Largo. He was a Knight of Pythias and an Elk. He was also a steward of Largo First Methodist Church. He was a member of the Democratic National Committee in 1932. In 1935, he was elected president of the Florida Citrus Exchange. He served in the Florida Senate and as an advocate for Florida citrus until his death.

== Death ==
Taylor suffered a heart attack while making a trip to promote Florida citrus, and died at home a week later in August 1936.

== Sources ==
- Blackwell, Theresa. "Tribute marks funeral of John S. Taylor." St. Petersburg Times. Aug. 17, 1936. reprinted August 20, 2006. Online. June 19, 2008.
- Cain, Gretchen. "Taylor Family reunion draws 140 together." Largo Leader. May 10, 1990.
- Goldman, Sue Searcy .Pinellas County, Florida. A History of the Board of County Commissioners of Pinellas County
- Goldman. Sue Searcy. A History of the Board of County Commissioners of Pinellas County. Online. June 25, 2008.
