= George B. Selden =

American patent lawyer and inventor of a version of the automobile

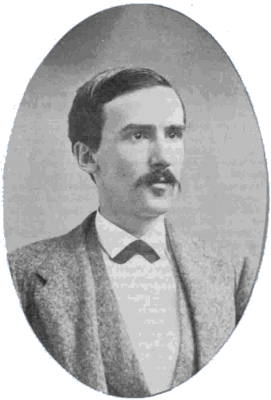
- Selden in 1871
- Born: George Baldwin Selden; September 14, 1846; Clarkson, New York, U.S.
- Died: January 17, 1922 (aged 75); Rochester, New York, U.S.
- Resting place: Mount Hope Cemetery, Rochester
- Education: University of Rochester (dropped out); Yale University (Sheffield Scientific School and Yale Law School)
- Occupations: Businessman; inventor; lawyer
- Known for: Inventing a version of the automobile
- Board member of: Association of Licensed Automobile Manufacturers; Electric Vehicle Company; Selden Motor Vehicle Company; Selden Truck Sales Corporation
- Spouse: Clara Drake Woodruff (m. 1871–1922)
- Children: 4
- Father: Henry R. Selden

George Baldwin Selden (September 14, 1846 – January 17, 1922) was an American patent lawyer and inventor from New York who was granted a U.S. patent for an automobile in 1895.

== Early life and career ==
In 1859, his father, Judge Henry R. Selden, a prominent Republican attorney most noted for defending Susan B. Anthony, moved to Rochester, New York, where George briefly attended the University of Rochester.

He dropped out when the American Civil War started, enlisting in the 6th Cavalry Regiment, Union Army. This was not to the liking of his father who, after pulling some strings and having some earnest discussions with his son, managed to have him released from duty and enrolled in Yale. George did not do well at Yale in his law studies, preferring the technical studies offered by the Sheffield Scientific School, but did finish his course of study and pass the New York bar in 1871. He joined his father's practice.

He married shortly thereafter to Clara Drake Woodruff, with whom he had four children. He continued his hobby of inventing in a workshop in his father's basement, inventing a typewriter and a hoop making machine.

For a time, Selden represented photography pioneer George Eastman in patent matters. He was also based in Rochester.

== The Selden patent ==
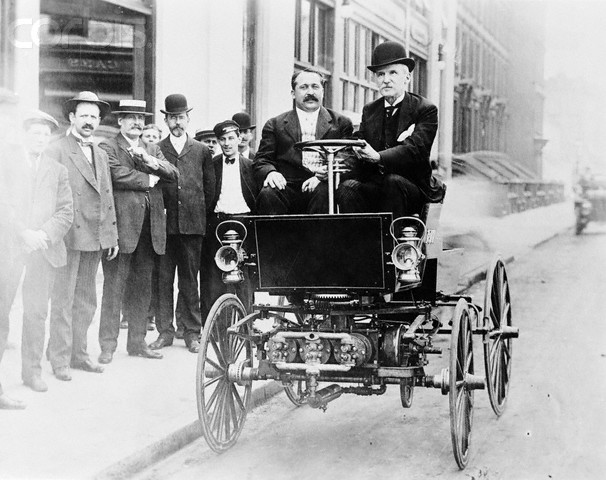
George B. Selden driving an automobile in 1905

He filed for a patent on May 8, 1879 (in a historical convergence of visionary minds, the witness Selden chose was a local bank-teller, George Eastman, later to become famous for the Kodak camera).

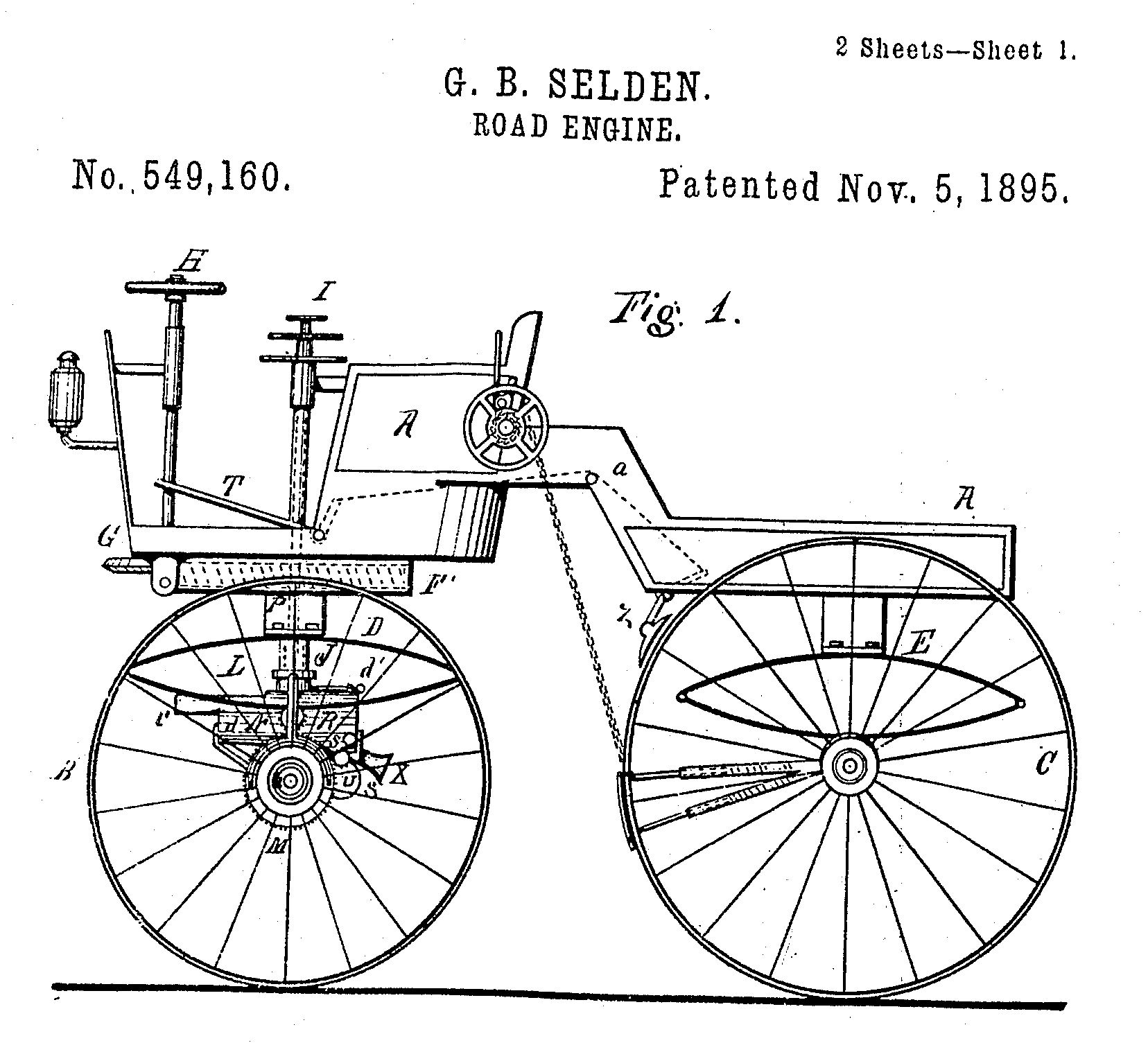
The Selden Road-Engine

In 1899 he sold his patent rights to William C. Whitney, who proposed manufacturing electric-powered taxicabs as the Electric Vehicle Company, EVC, for a royalty of US$15 per car with a minimum annual payment of US$5,000. Whitney and Selden then worked together to collect royalties from other budding automobile manufacturers. He was initially successful, negotiating a 0.75% royalty on all cars sold by the Association of Licensed Automobile Manufacturers. He began his own car company in Rochester under the name Selden Motor Vehicle Company.

Henry Ford, owner of the Ford Motor Company, founded in Detroit, Michigan, in 1903, and four other car makers resolved to contest the patent infringement suit filed by Selden and EVC. The legal fight lasted eight years, generating a case record of 14,000 pages. Ford's testimony included the comment, "It is perfectly safe to say that George Selden has never advanced the automobile industry in a single particular...and it would perhaps be further advanced than it is now if he had never been born."

The 1906 Krebs testimony in the Selden case

The case was heavily publicized in the newspapers of the day, and ended in a victory for Selden. The judge wrote in his decision that the patent covered any automobile propelled by an engine powered by gasoline vapor. Posting a bond of US$350,000, Ford appealed, and on January 10, 1911, won his case based on an argument that the engine used in automobiles was not based on George Brayton's engine, the Brayton engine, which Selden had improved, but on the Otto engine.

This stunning defeat, with only one year left to run on the patent, destroyed Selden's income stream. He focused production of his car company on trucks, renaming his company the Selden Truck Sales Corporation. It survived in that form until 1930 when it was purchased by the Bethlehem Motor Truck Corporation. Selden suffered a stroke in late 1921 and died aged 75 on January 17, 1922. He was buried in Mount Hope Cemetery in Rochester. It is estimated he received several hundred thousand dollars in royalties.

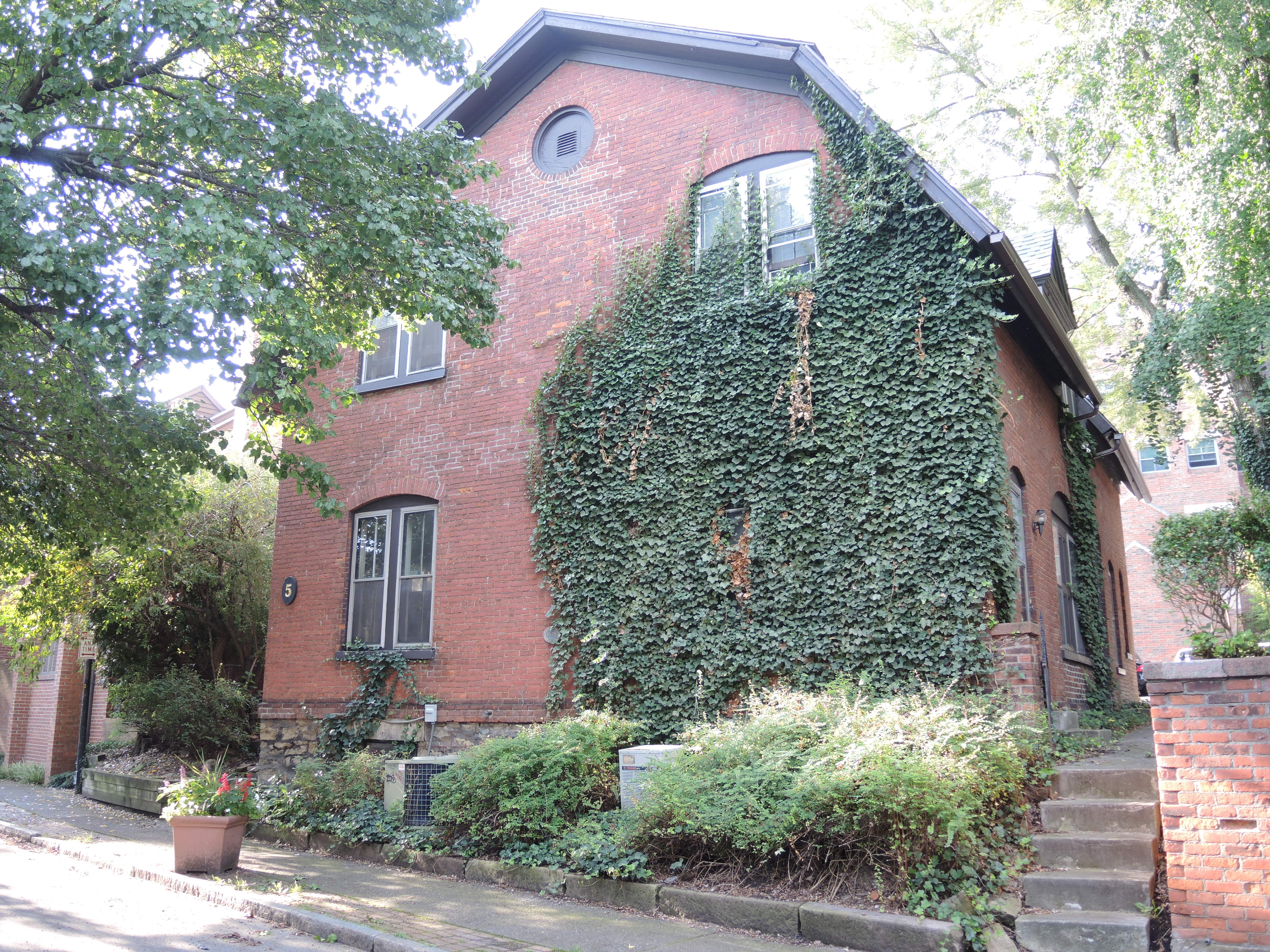
Selden's workshop, which no longer stands, was located behind this house in Rochester's Grove Place Historic District.

== See also ==
- The Wright brothers patent war, another vehicular technology patent lawsuit of the same time period
- George Brayton, inventor of the Brayton cycle engine
