= Selden Motor Vehicle Company =

Defunct American motor vehicle manufacturer

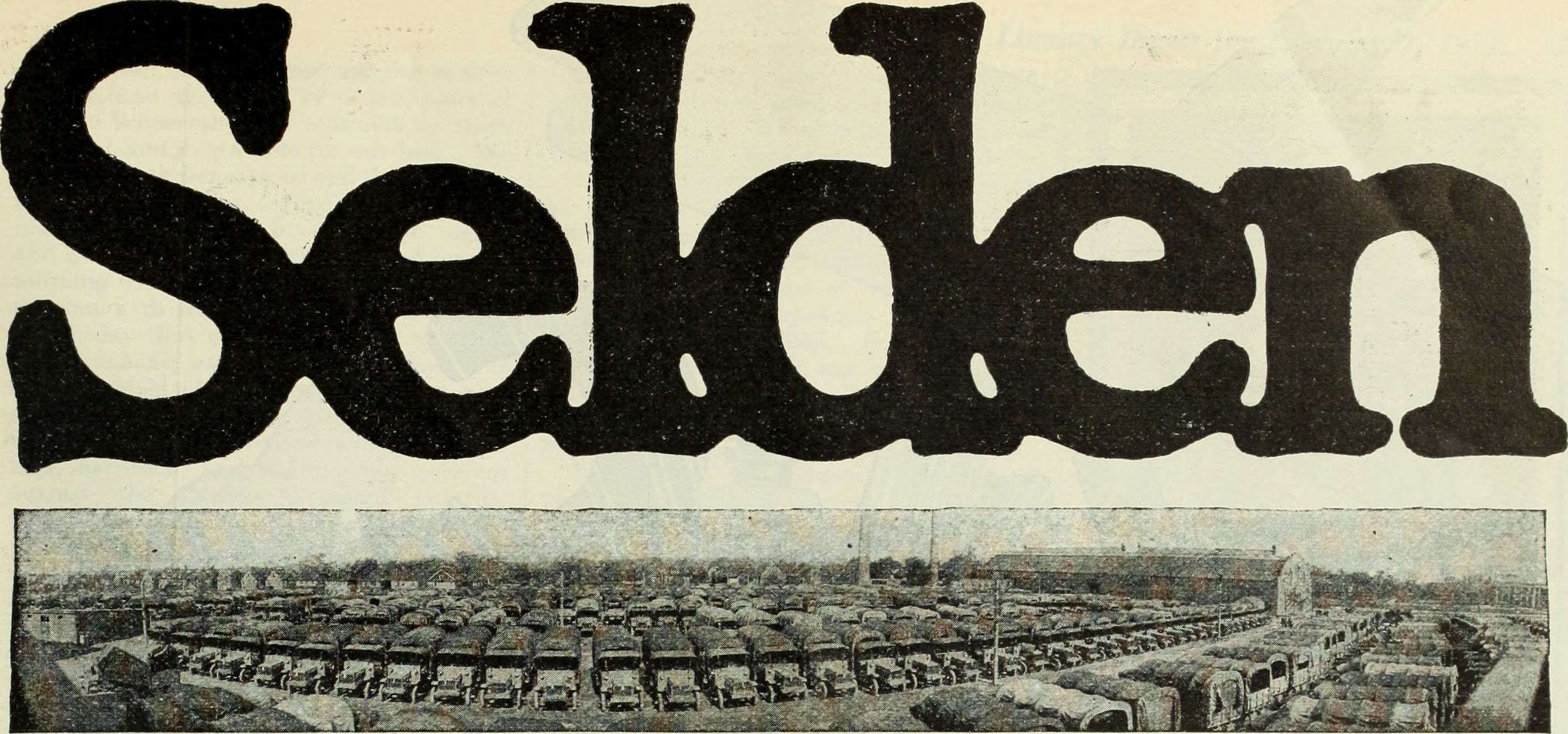
- 1919 Selden advertisement in The Literary Digest
- Industry: Automotive
- Predecessor: Buffalo Gasoline Motor Company
- Founded: 1906; 120 years ago
- Founder: George Baldwin Seldon
- Defunct: 1932; 94 years ago
- Headquarters: Rochester, New York, United States
- Key people: George B. Selden, E. T. Birdsall, Frederick A. Law
- Products: Automobiles
- Production output: 7,424 (1908-1914)

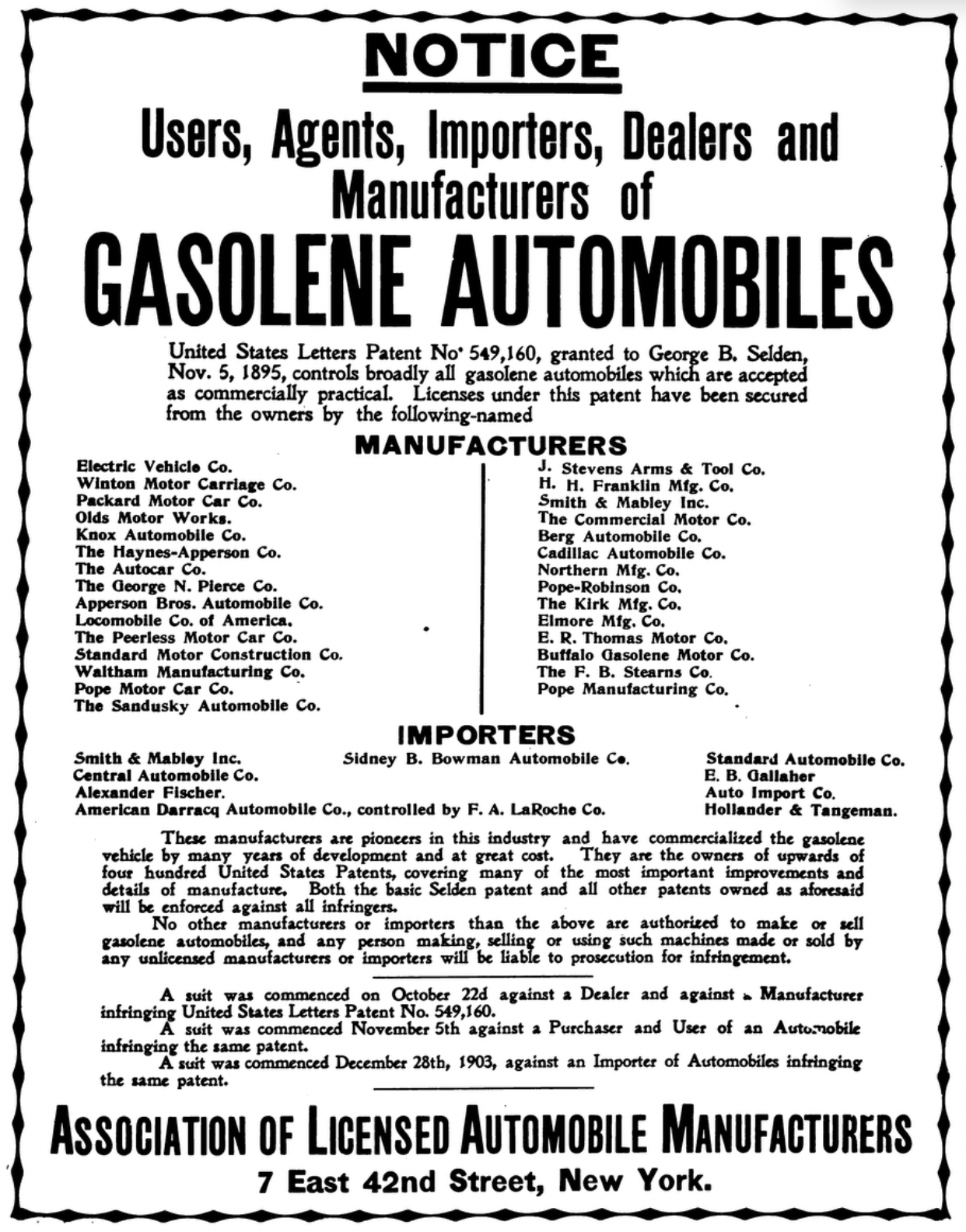
Selden Patent No. 549,160

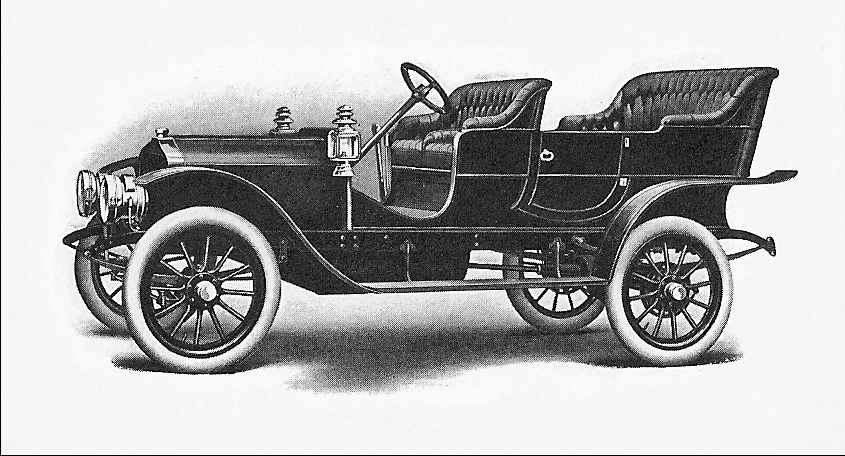
1908 Selden Model 25

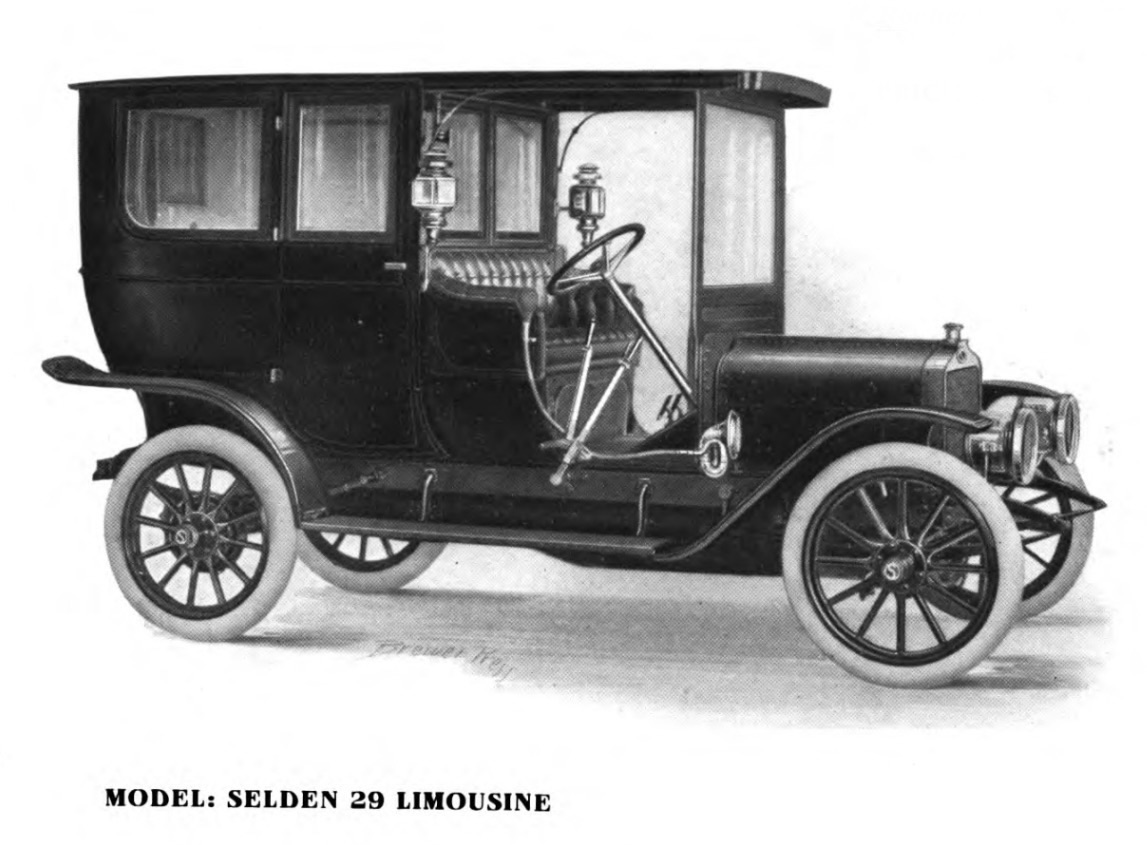
Selden Model 29 (1909-1910)

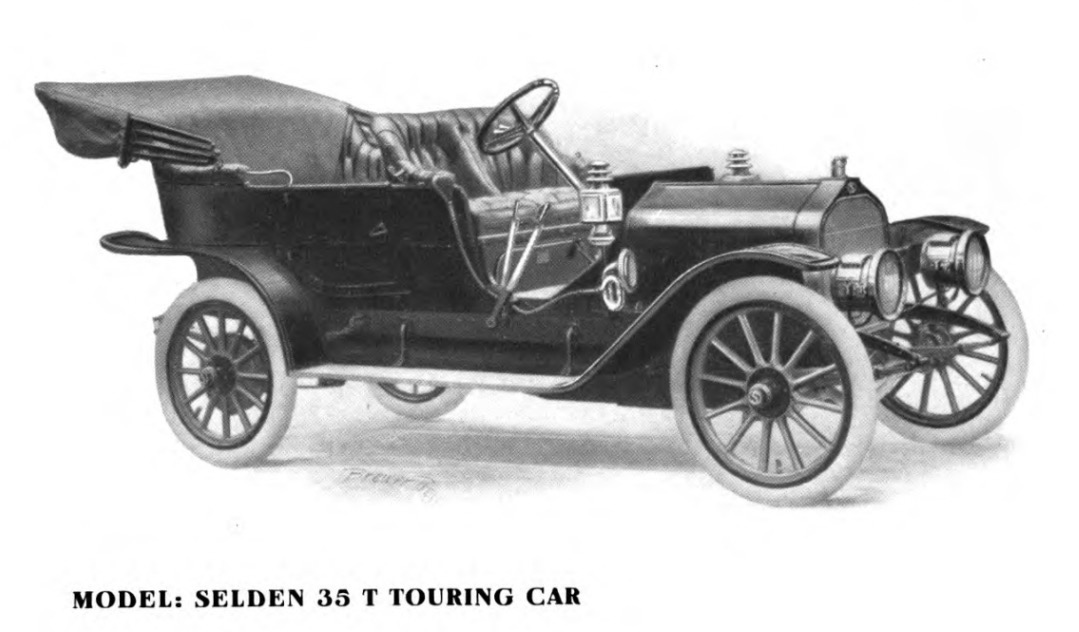
Selden Model 35 T (1910)

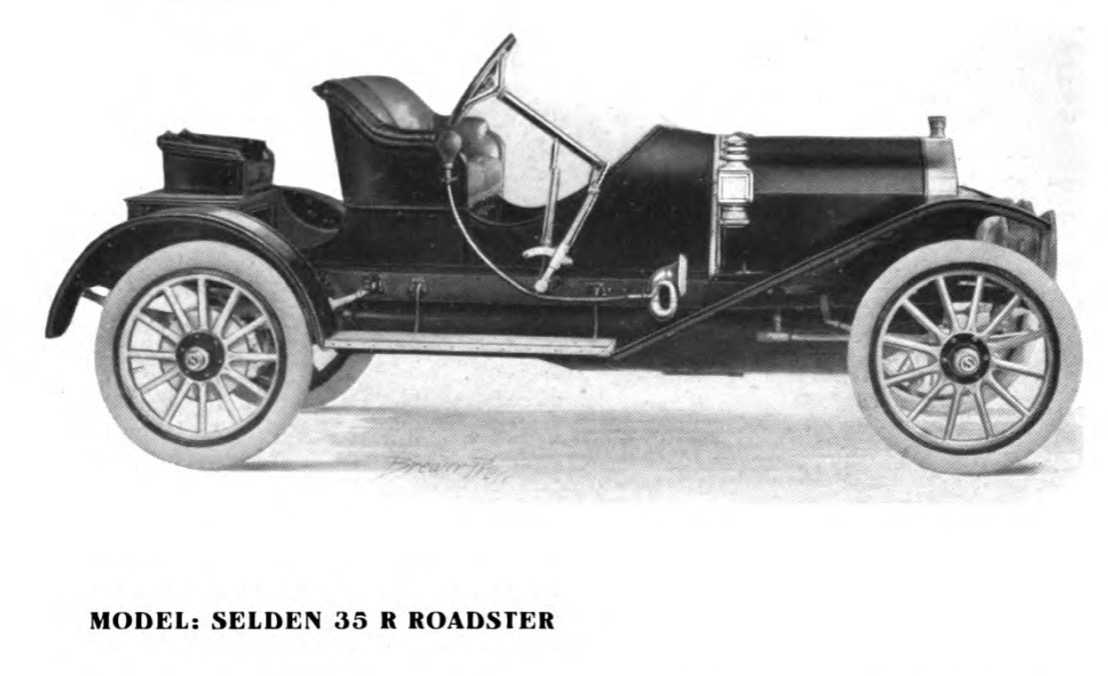
Selden Model 35 R (1910)

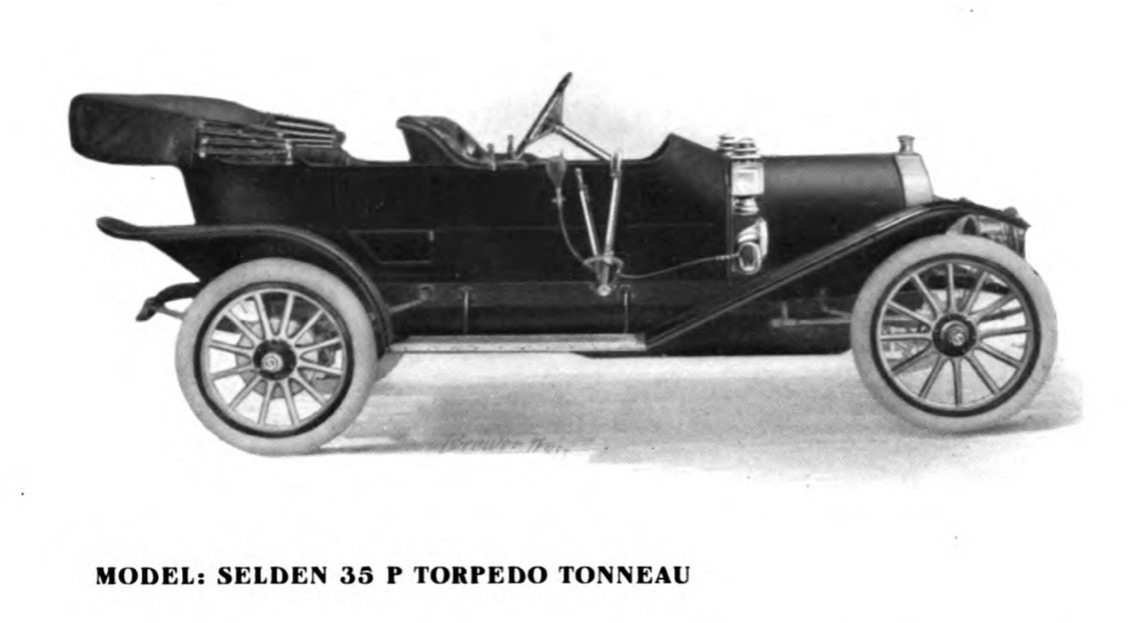
Selden Model 35 P (1910)

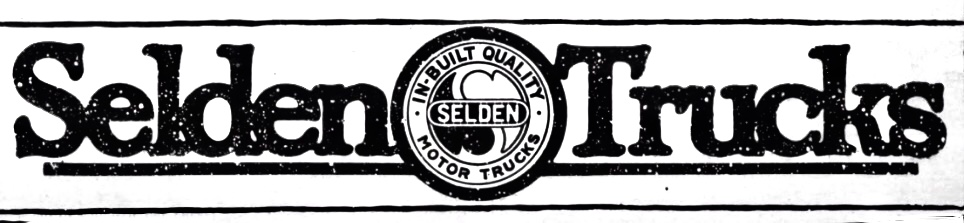
Selden Trucks Logo (1918)

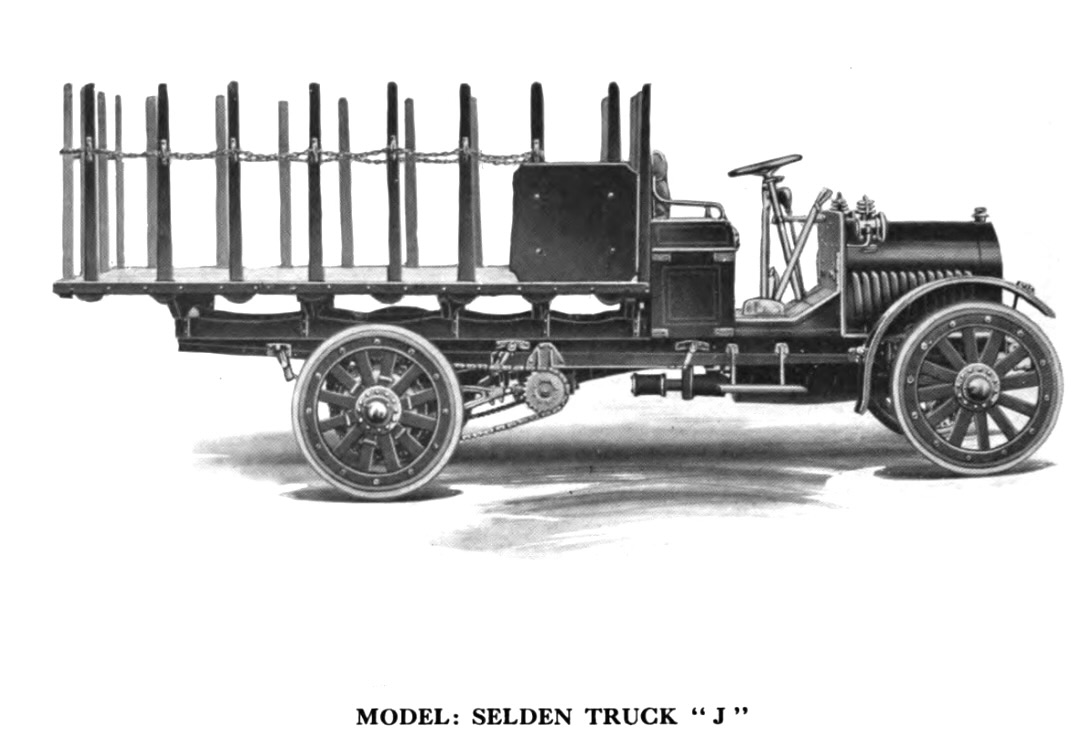
Selden Model J (1914)

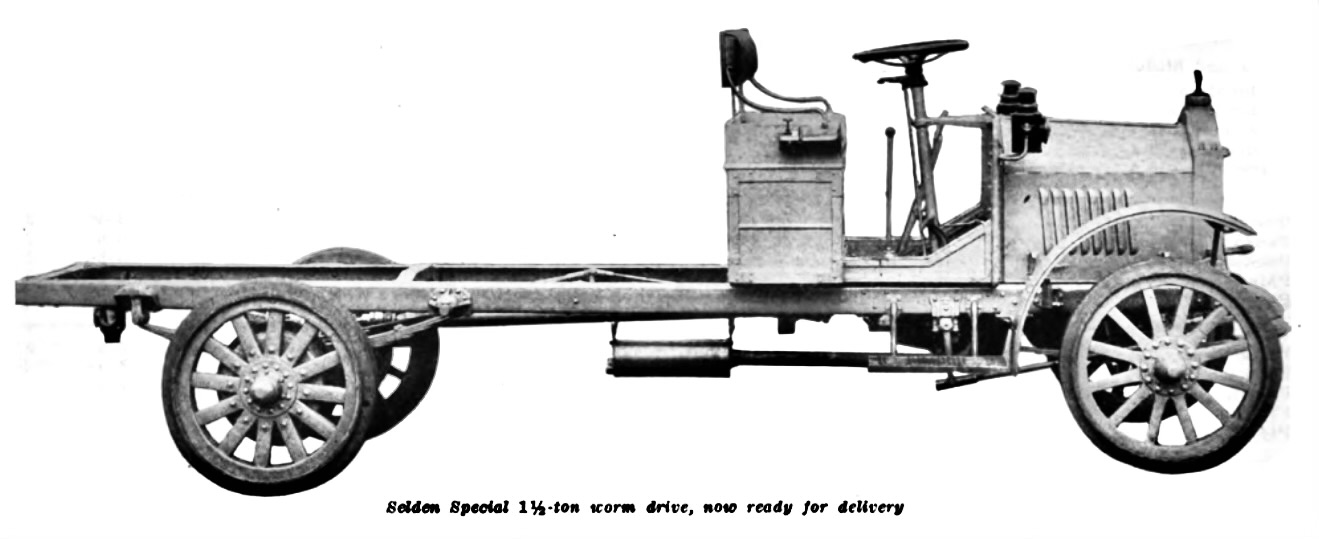
Selden Special (1919)

Selden advertisement (1925)

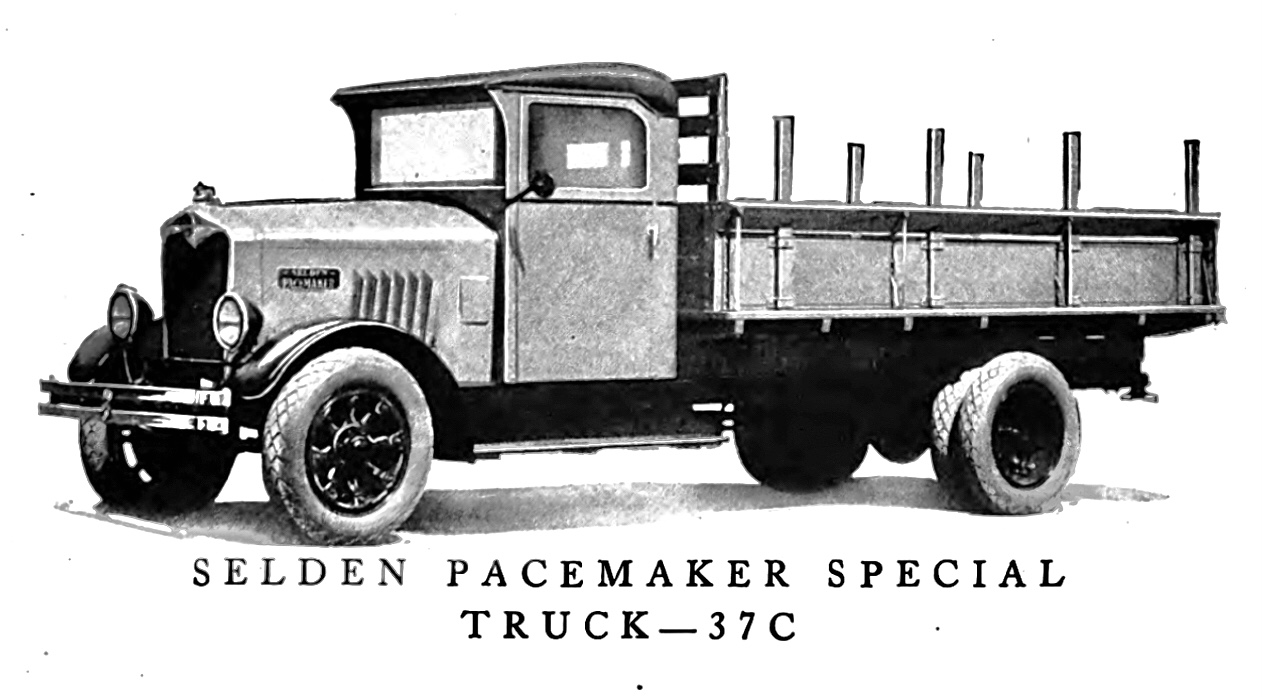
Selden 37 C (1929)

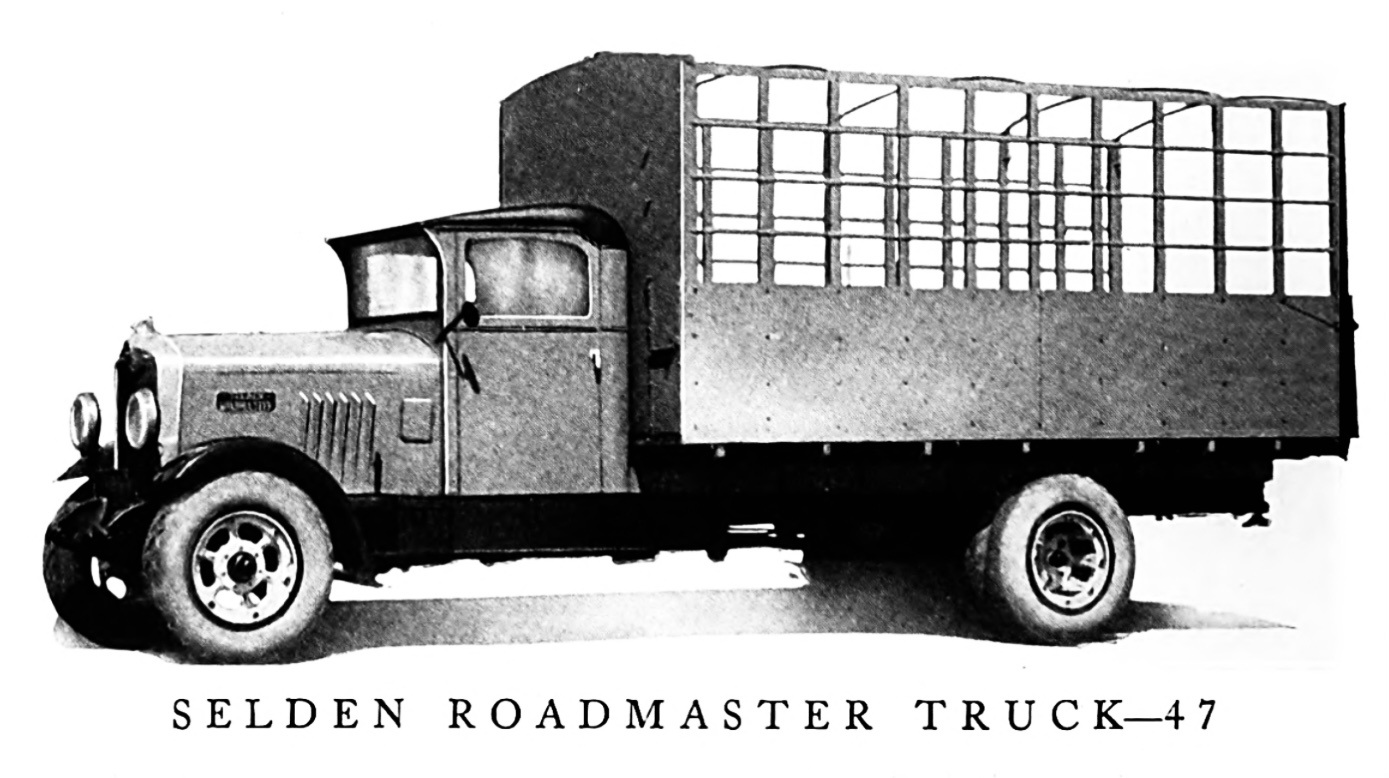
Selden 47 (1929)

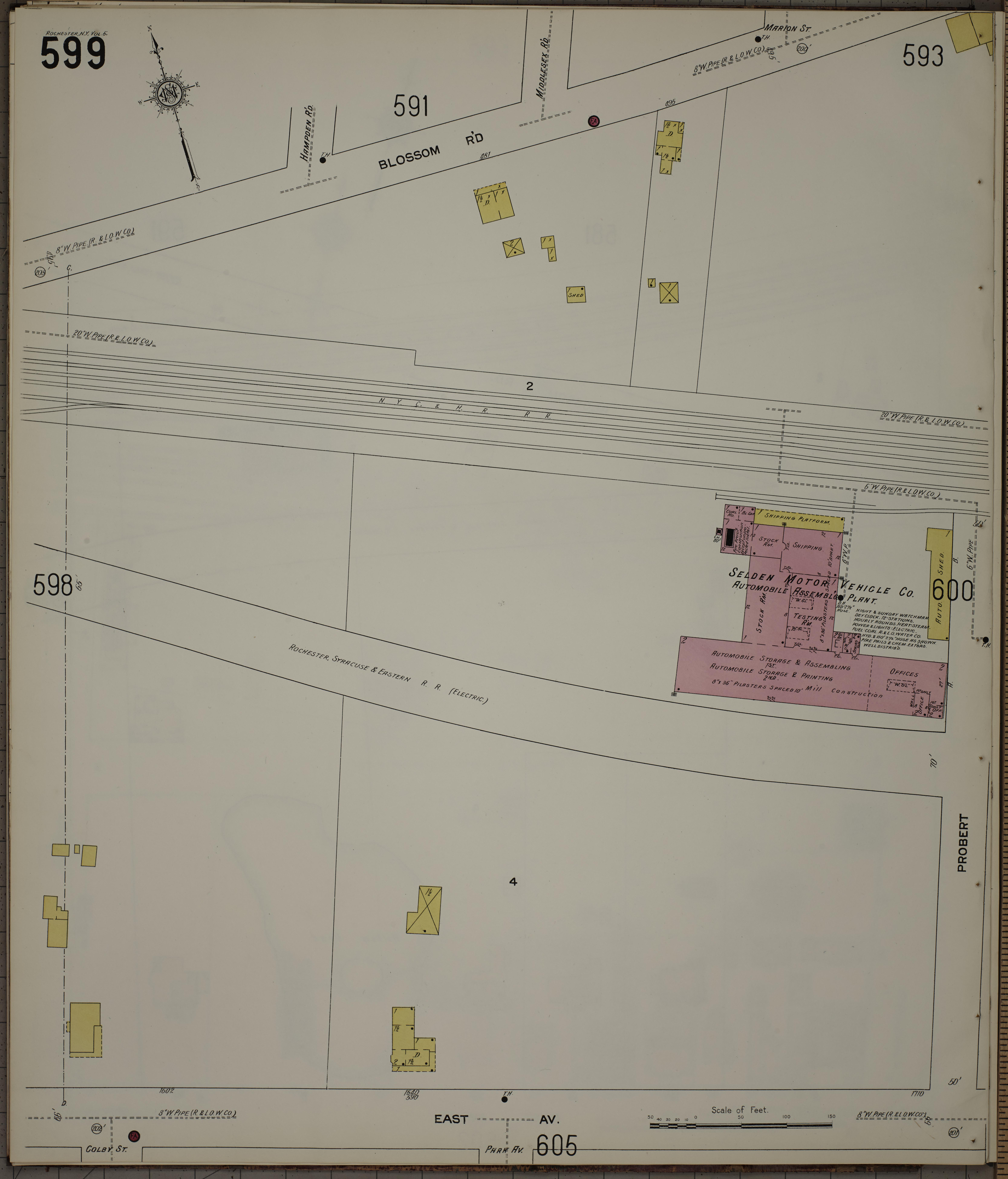
Selden plant (1912)

The Selden Motor Vehicle Company was a Brass Era American manufacturer of automobiles. The company, founded in 1906, was based in Rochester, New York, and built automobiles from 1907 to 1914 and trucks from 1913 to 1932.

== History ==
The Selden Motor Vehicle Company was founded by George B. Selden, whose 1877 patent was the first U.S. patent of a "horseless carriage" which because of numerous later amendments was not granted until 1895. To make the patent more credible, in 1907 Selden built a car on the lines of the 1877 design. This patent would be declared "unenforceable" in 1911.

E. T. Birdsall designed the first Selden, a 30hp 4-cylinder car placed on the market in June 1907. A car in the $2,000 to $2,500 (equivalent to $86,384 in 2025) price range, the Selden grew from a 109-inch wheelbase car to a 125-inch wheelbase. In 1911 George Selden's patent was declared unenforceable, and his factory had a fire that summer. Insurance covered the damages and production continued. Late in 1911, the company was reorganized internally, with Frederick A. Law, formerly with Columbia became designer and plant superintendent. The last Selden passenger cars were built in 1914.

In 1913, the company began production of Selden trucks and this successfully continued until the company's sale to the Hahn Motor Truck Company of Hamburg, Pennsylvania in 1930. Hahn and Selden went out of business in 1932. George B. Selden died in 1923.

== Production models ==
- Selden Model 25
- Selden Model 29
- Selden Model 35
- Selden Model 46

Trucks 1914

- Model J
  - Wheelbase 125 inches = 3175 mm.
- Model JL
  - Wheelbase 145 inches = 3683 mm.

1918

- Model G (0,75 to)
- Model TXL (1 to)
- Model TXR (1 to)
- Model TWL (1 to)
- Model JCB (2 to)
- Model JWB (2 to)
- Model NL (3,5 to)
- Model DL (5 to)

1919

- Model Special (1,5 to)
- Model JWBL (2 to)
- Model 3,5 (3,5 to)
- Model DL (5 to)

1920

- Model 1,5-A (1,5 to)
- Model 2,5-A-11 (2,5 to)
- Model 2,5-A-14 (2,5 to)
- Model 3,5-A-14 (3,5 to)
- Model 3,5-A-16 (3,5 to)
- Model 5-A-12,5 (5 to)
- Model 5-A-16 (5 to)

1925

- Model Pacemaker (1,25 to)
- Model 33 (2 to)
- Model 40 (2 to)
- Model 50 (2,5 to)
- Model 53 (3 to)
- Model 70 (3,5 to)
- Model 73 (4 to)
- Model 90 (5-7 to)

1929

- Model 37 C
- Model 47

== Advertisements ==
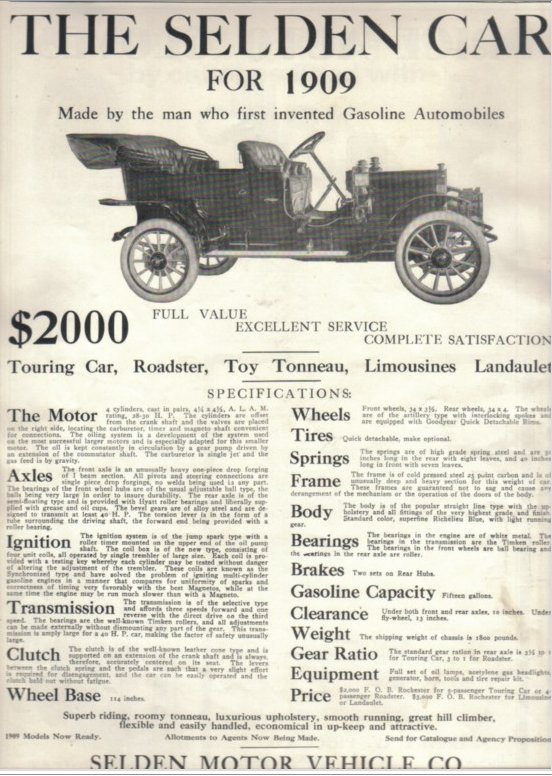
1909 Selden Model 29 advertisement

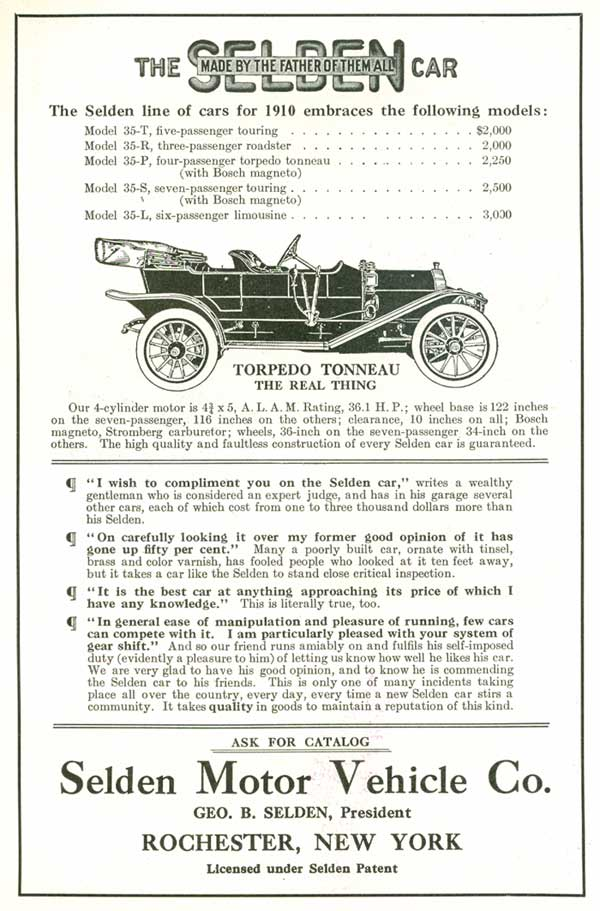
1910 Selden Model 35 advertisement

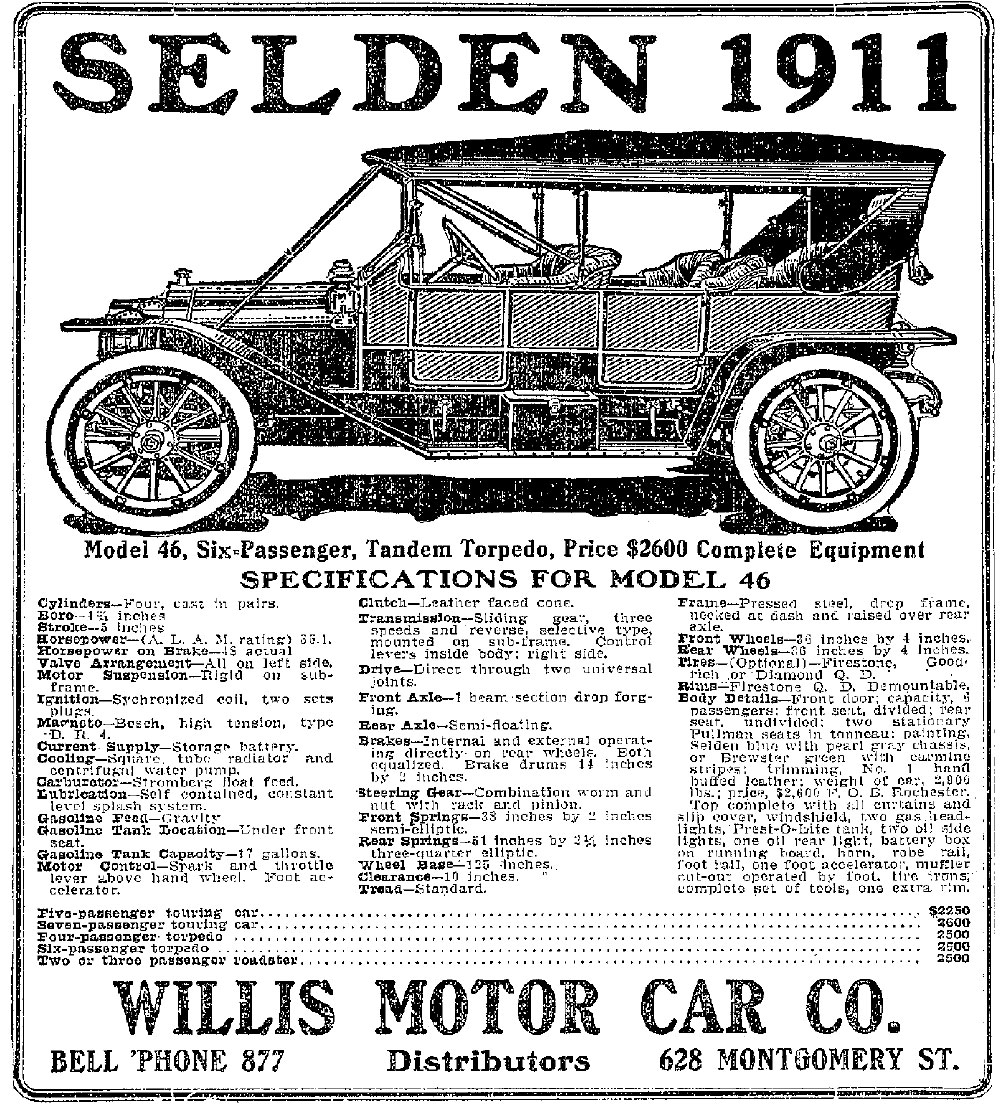
1911 Selden Model 46 advertisement

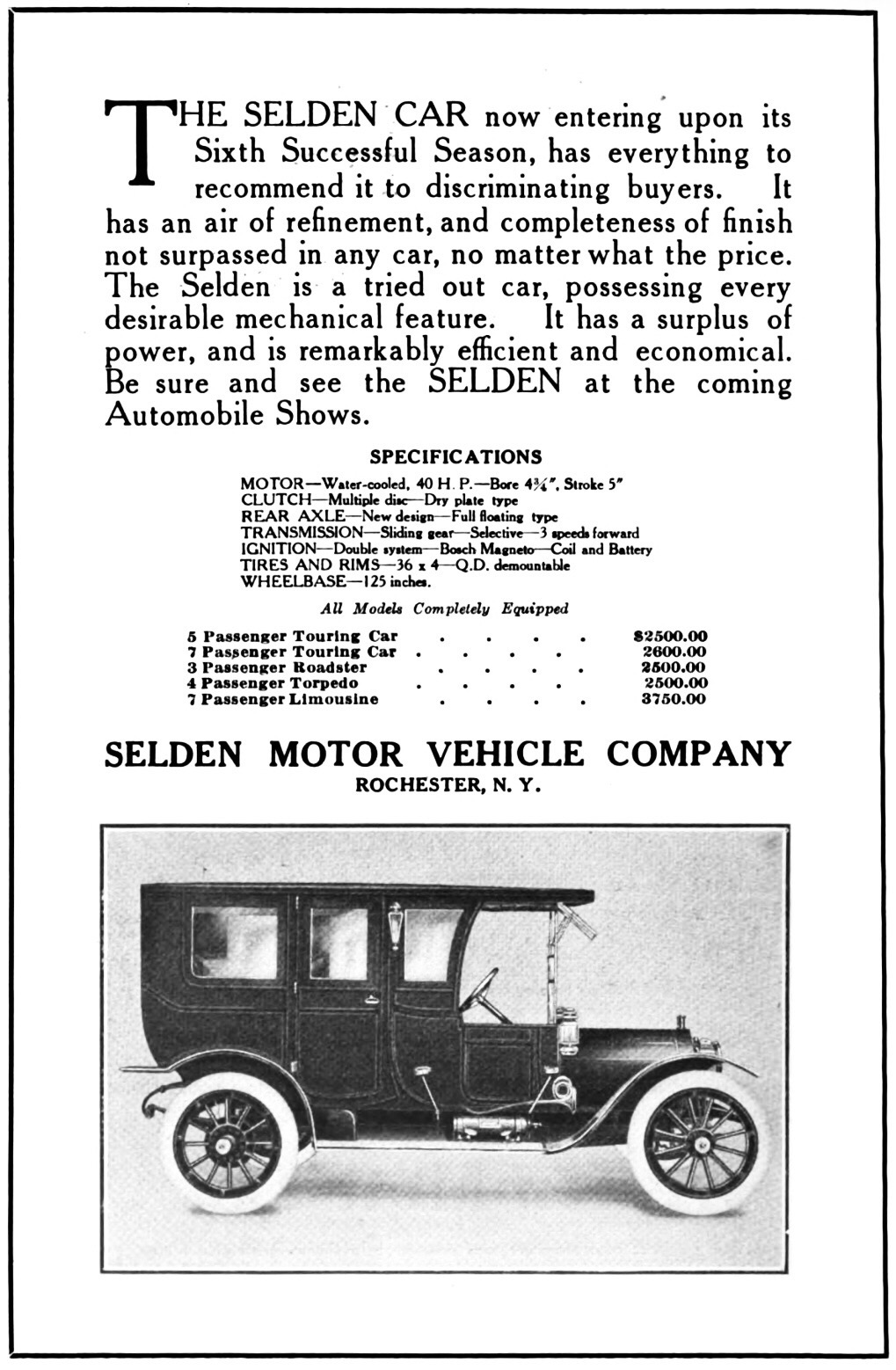
Selden advertisement (1912)

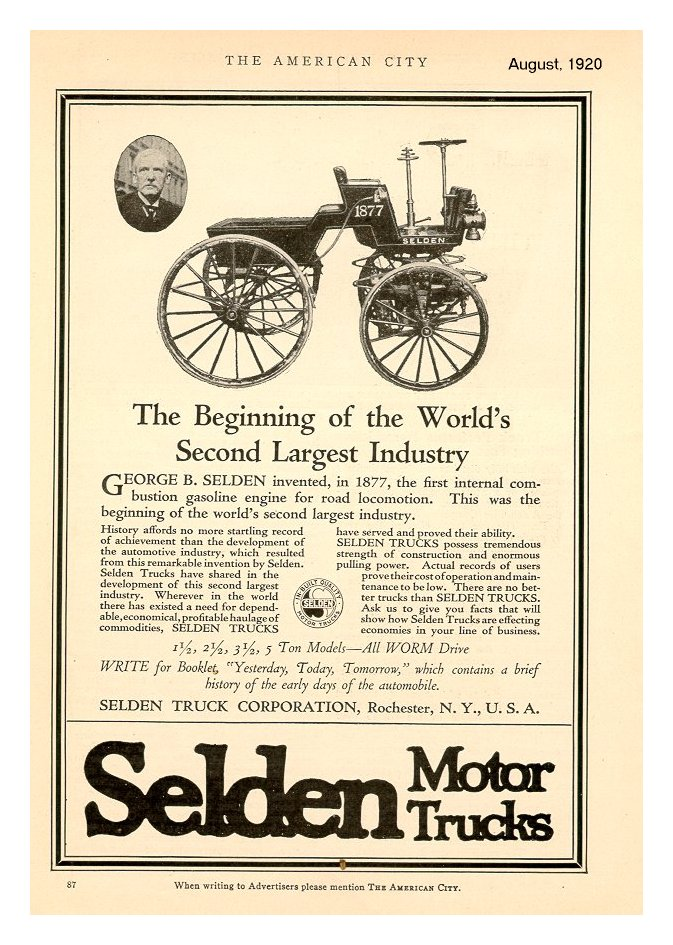
1920 Selden Motor Trucks advertisement

== See also ==
- List of defunct automobile manufacturers
- Association of Licensed Automobile Manufacturers
- Electric Vehicle Company
