= Grove Place Historic District =

Historic district in New York, United States

- U.S. National Register of Historic Places
- U.S. Historic district
- Location within New York Location within the United States
- Location: Gibbs, Selden, Grove and Windsor Sts., Rochester, New York
- Coordinates: 43°9′35″N 77°36′3″W
- Area: 8.1 acres (3.3 ha)
- Built: 1845
- Architectural style: Late 19th And 20th Century Revivals, Late Victorian
- MPS: Inner Loop MRA
- NRHP reference No.: 84000299
- Added to NRHP: October 11, 1984

Grove Place Historic District is a national historic district located at Rochester in Monroe County, New York. The district includes all that remains and is associated with "The Grove," the original homestead area of Rochester's Selden and Ward families. It is an enclave of 22 substantially intact small-scale 19th century residences, constructed between about 1850 and 1895, which were built, owned, and occupied by this complex extended family.

It was listed on the National Register of Historic Places in 1984.

Gibbs Street

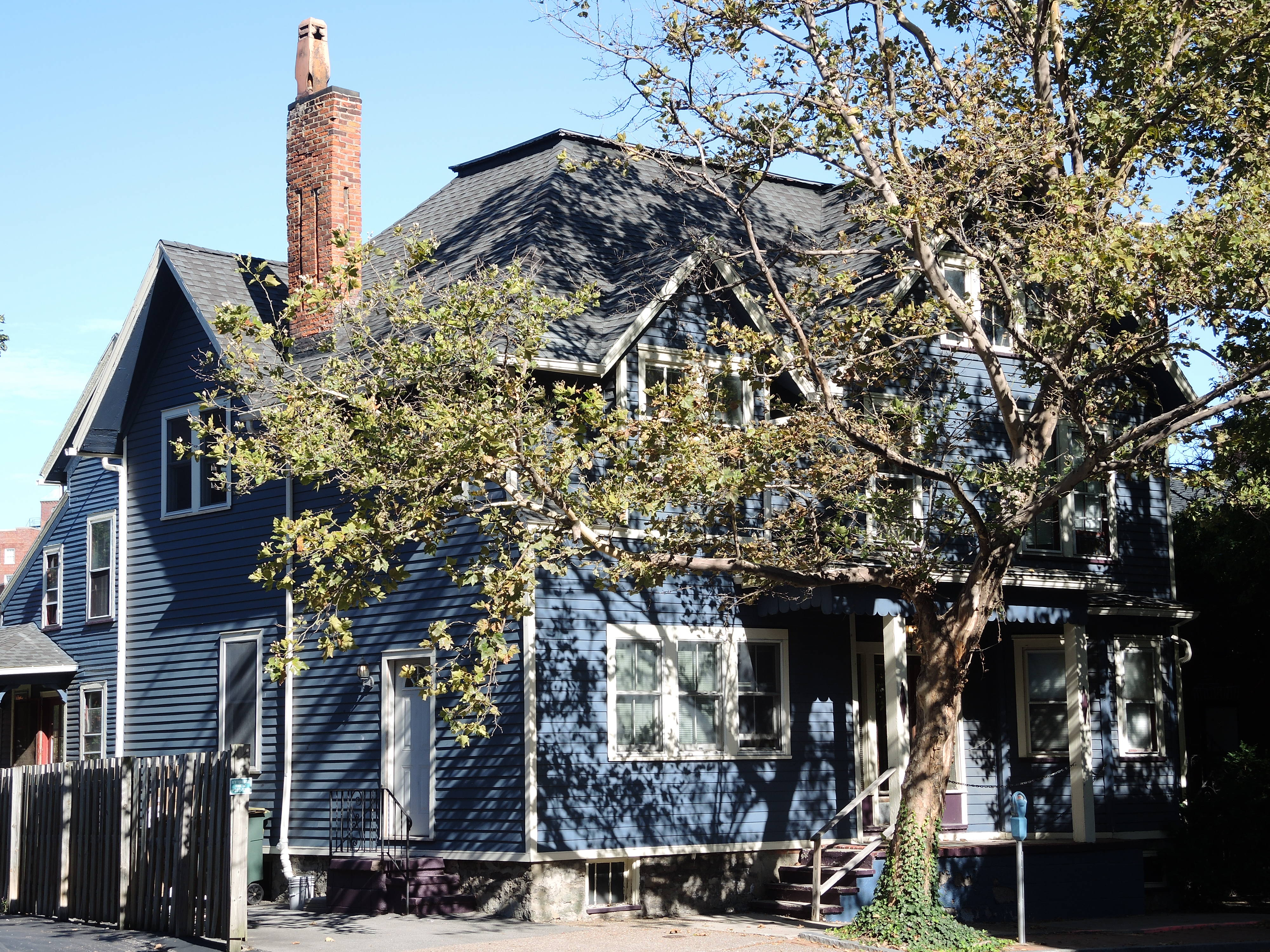
125 Gibbs Street

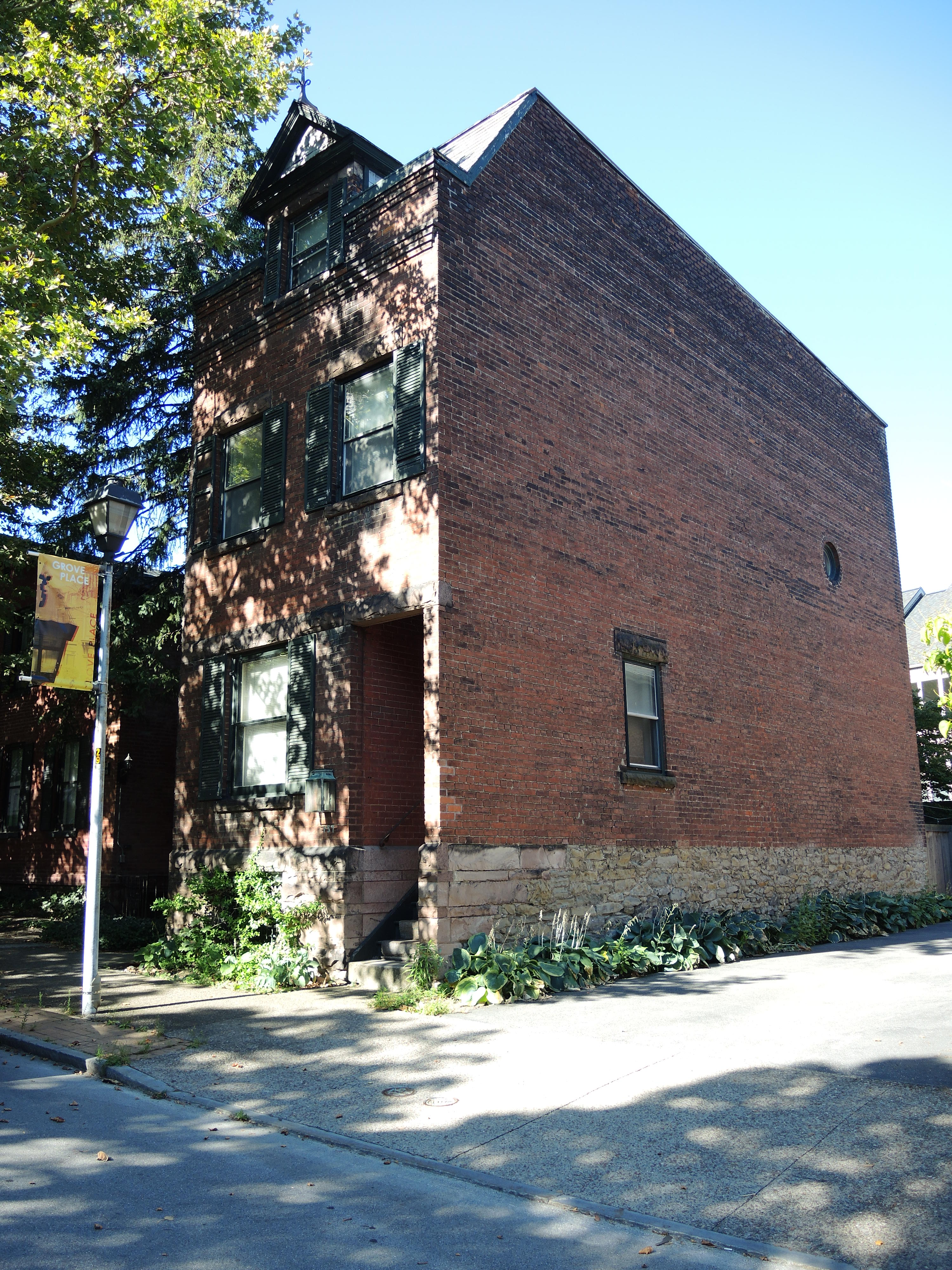
137 Gibbs Street

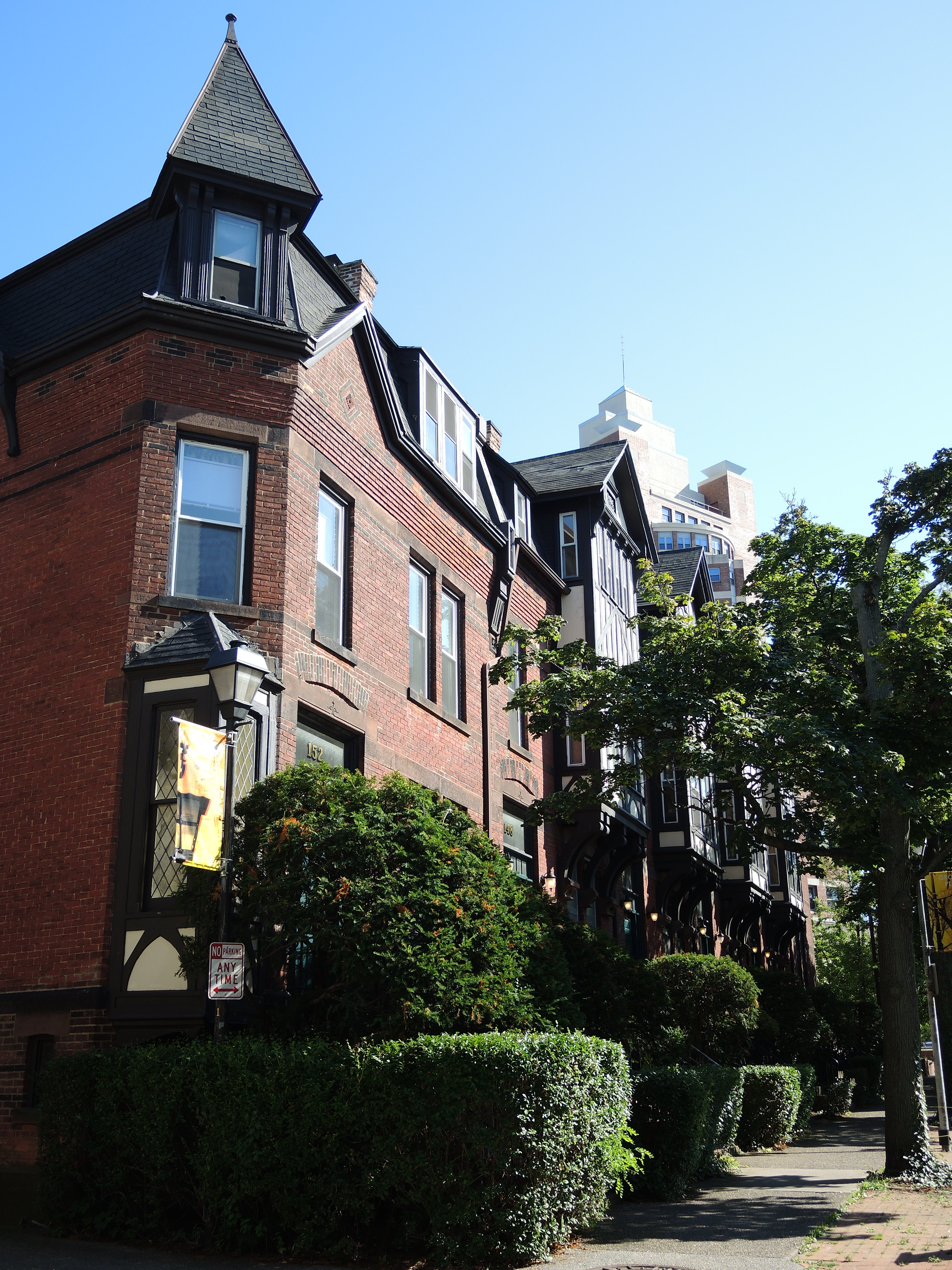
144, 148, and 152 Gibbs Street (a.k.a., "the Townhouse")

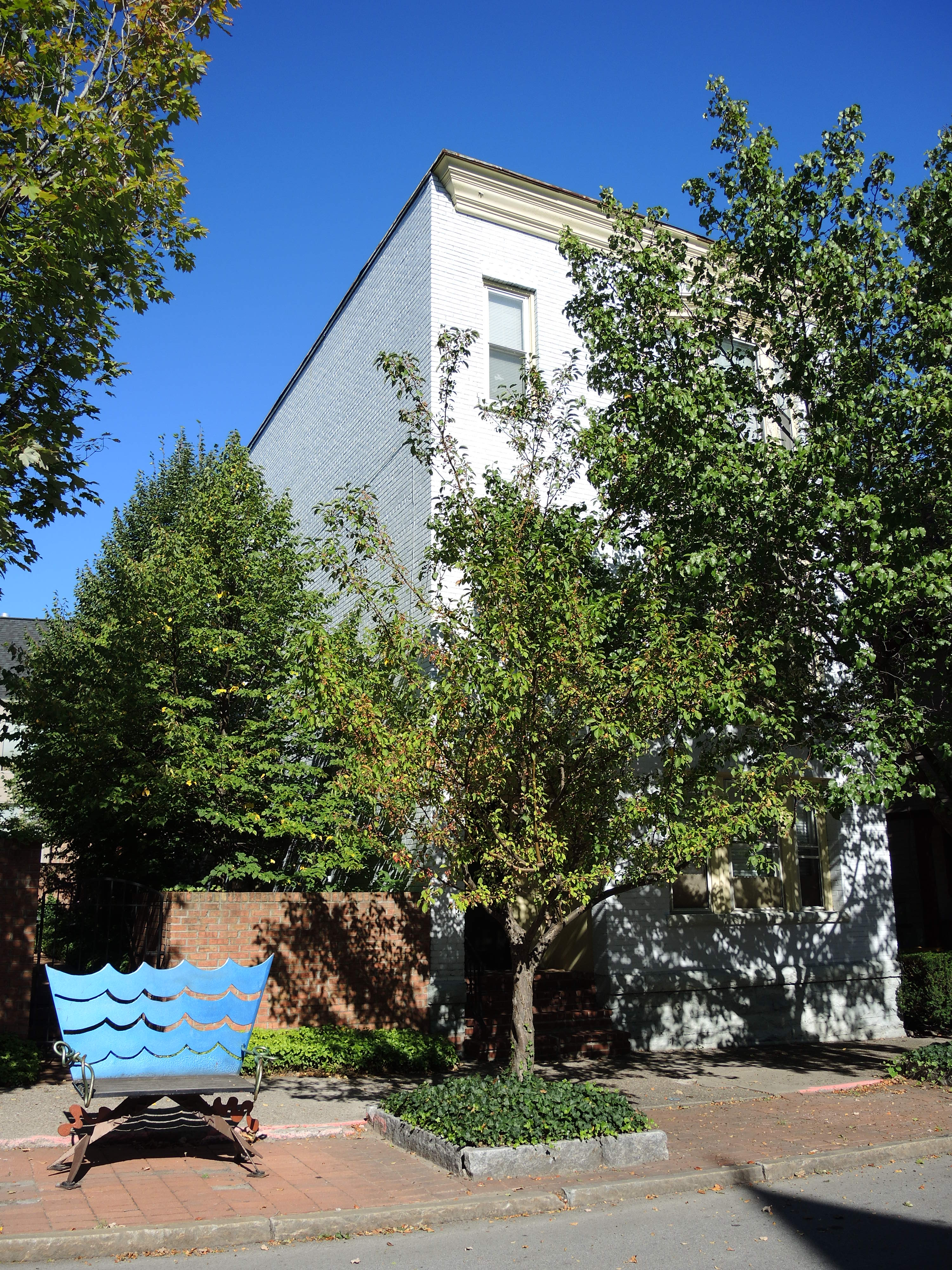
153 Gibbs Street

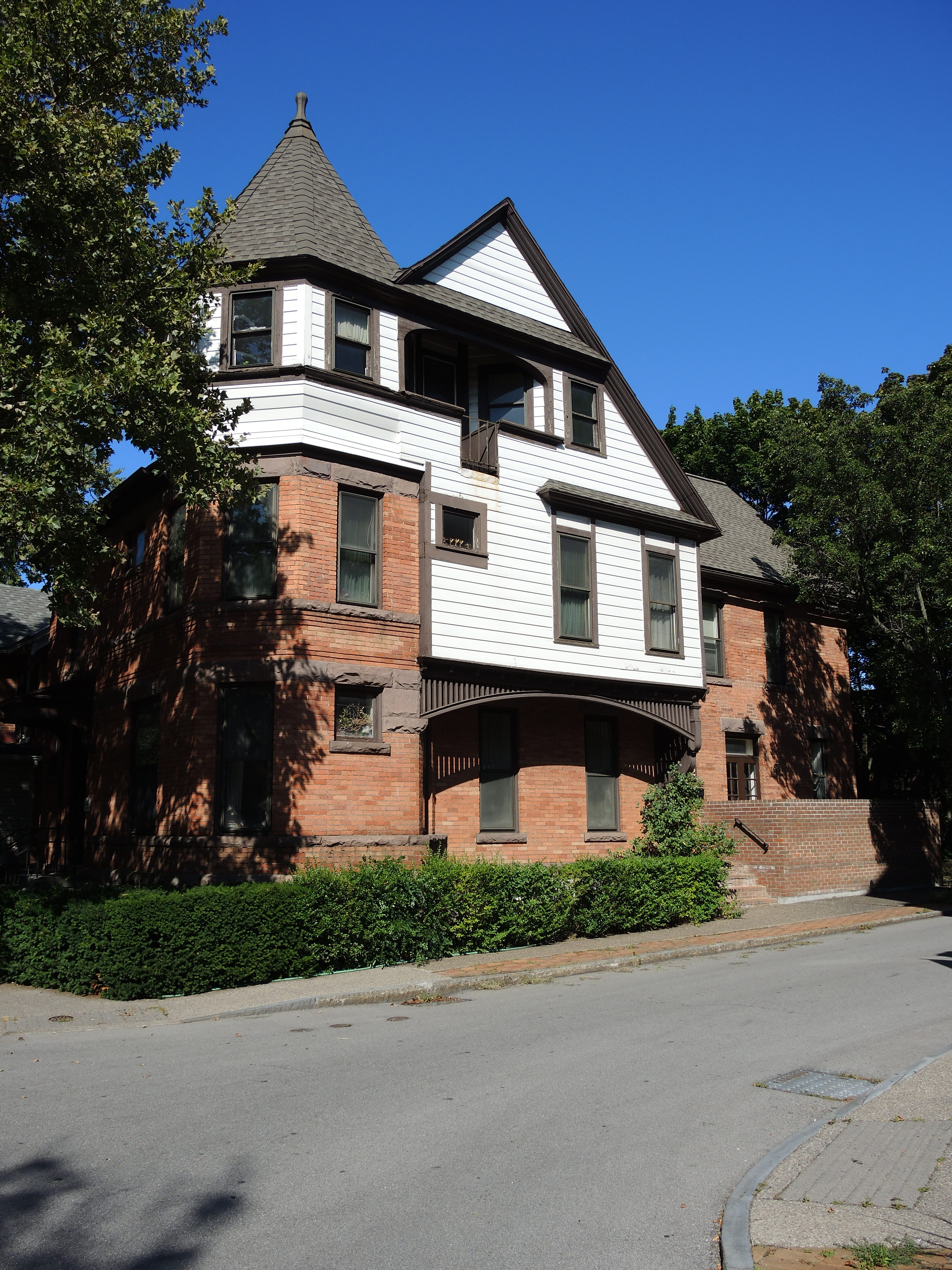
158 Gibbs Street

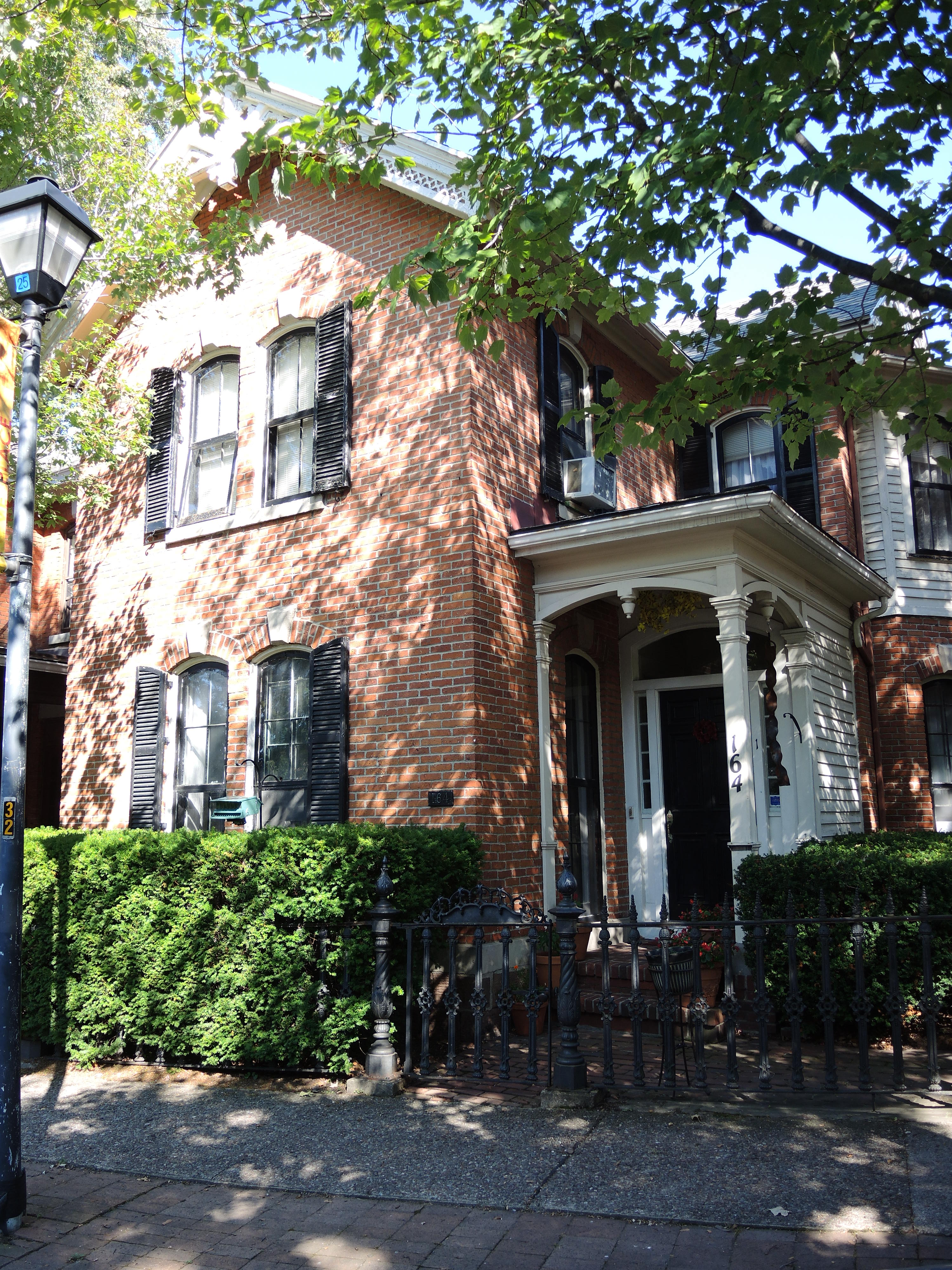
164 Gibbs Street

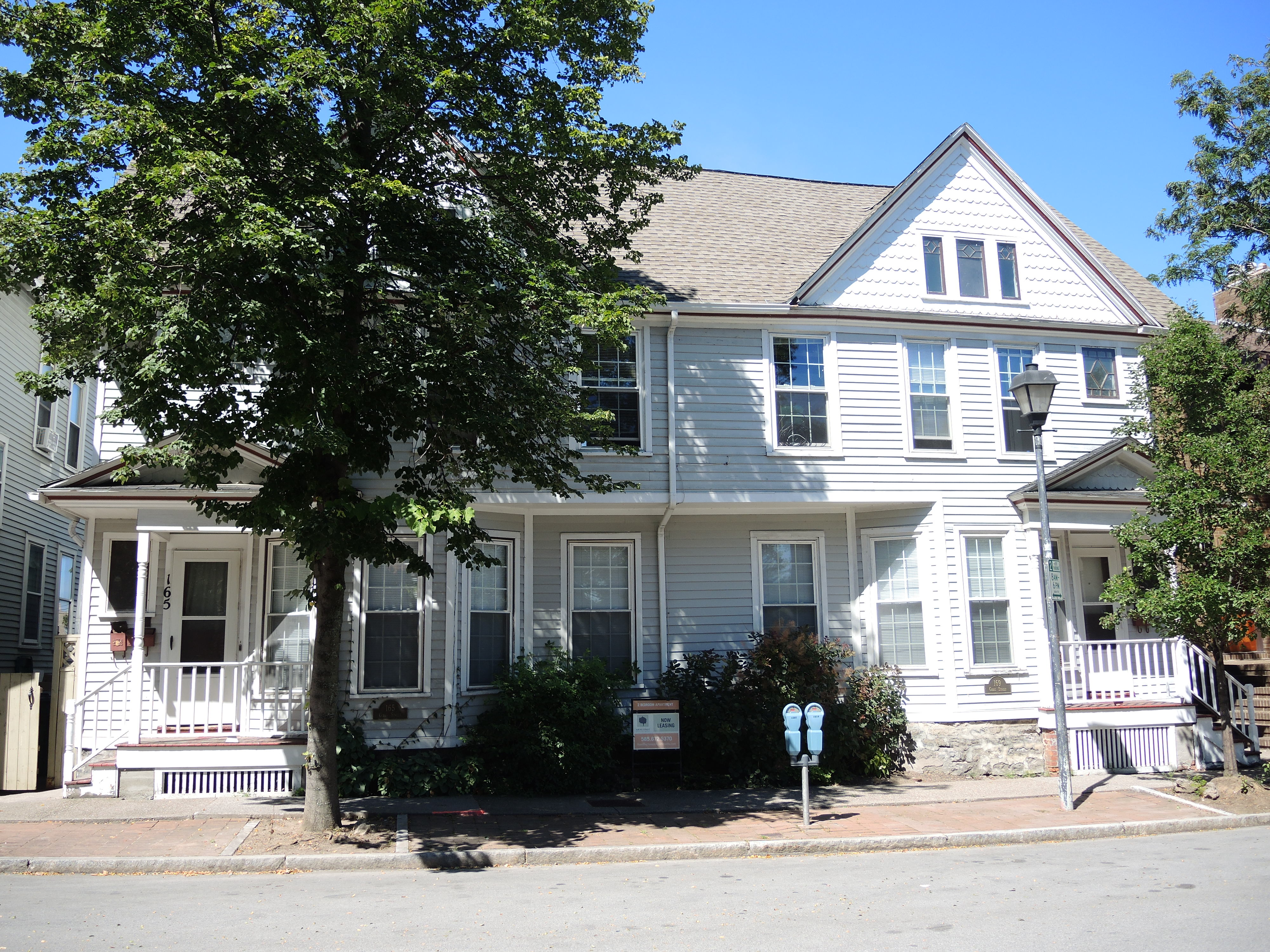
165 and 169 Gibbs Street
Grove Place

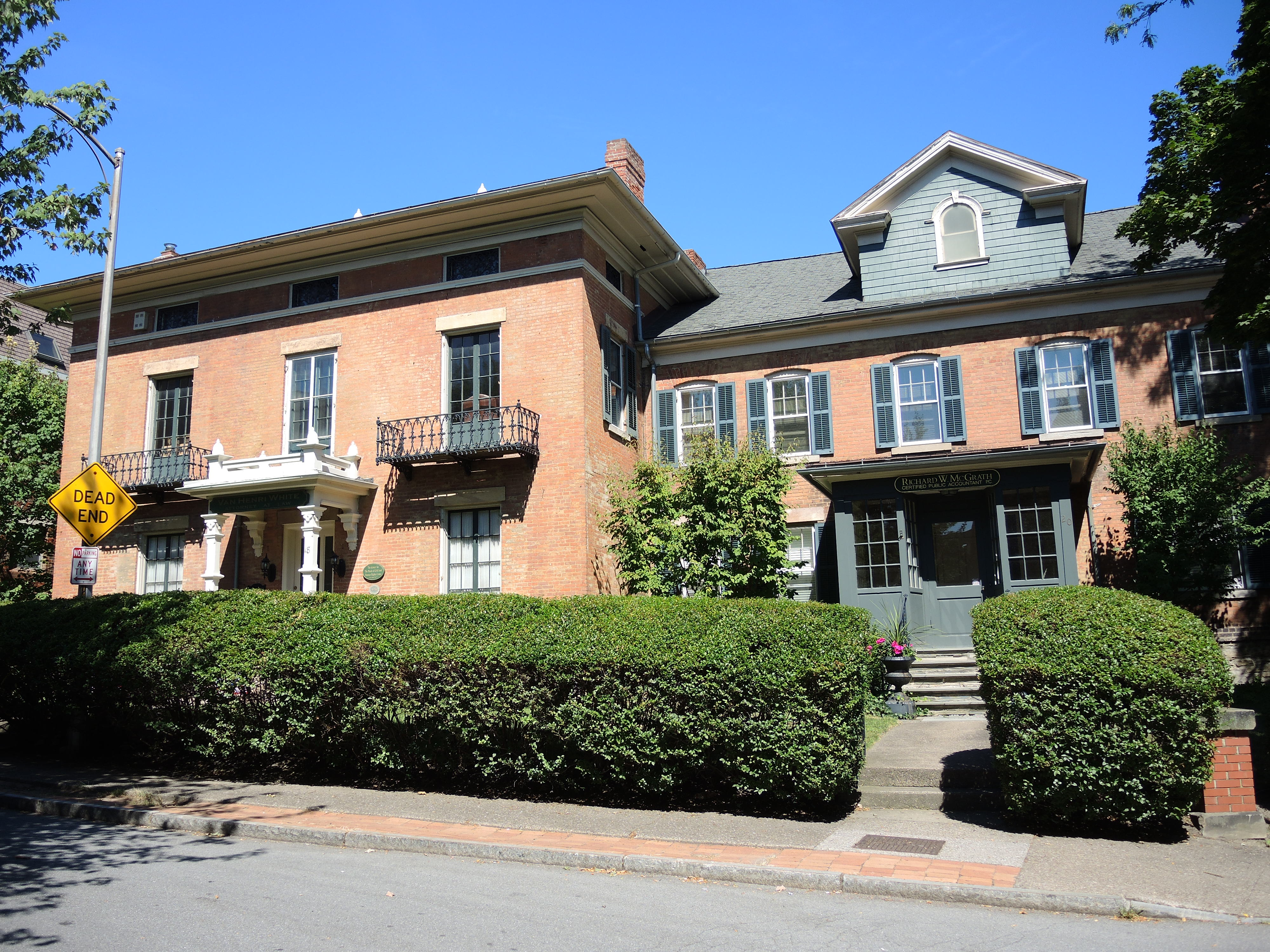
18 and 20 Grove Place

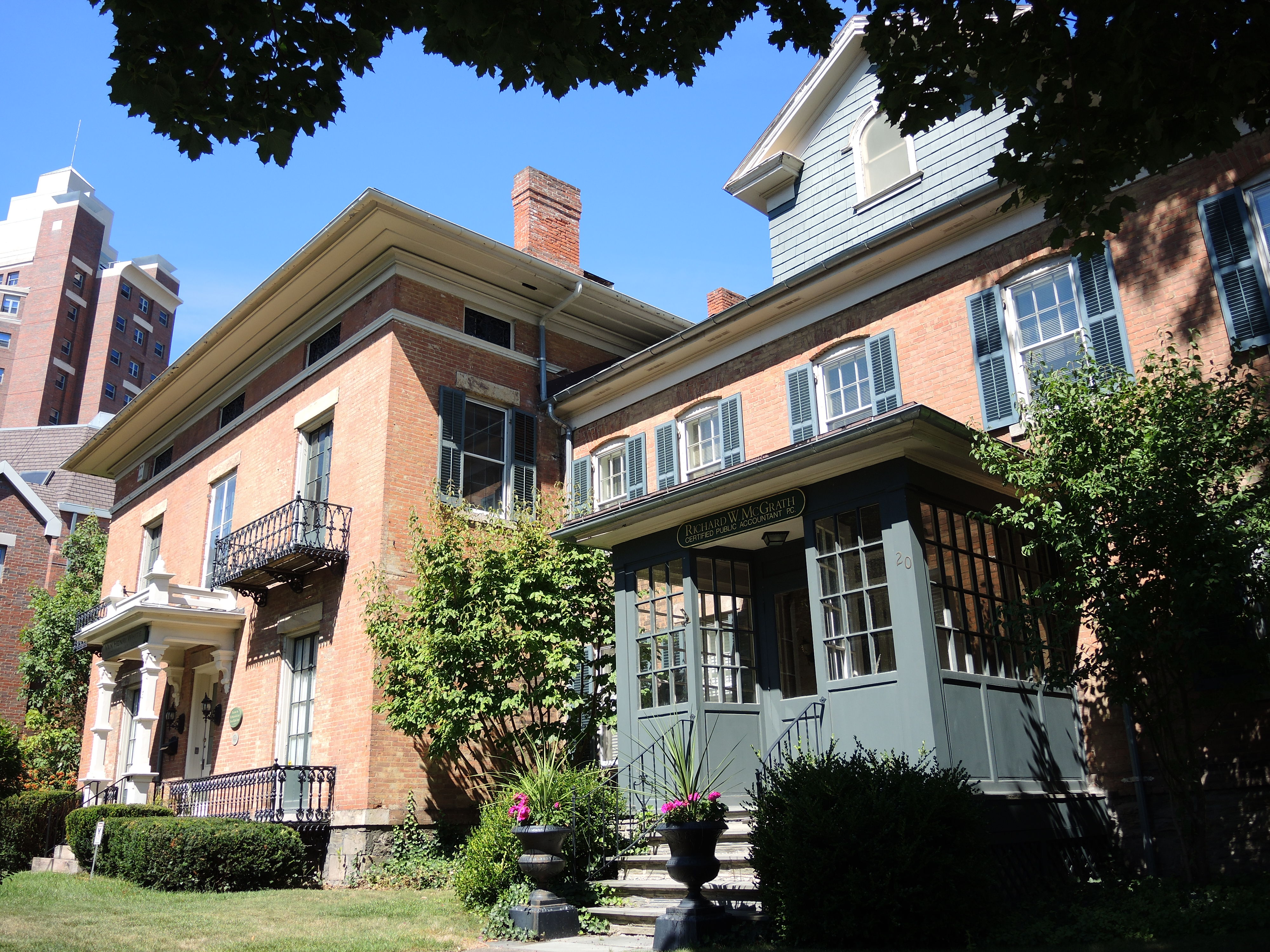
18 and 20 Grove Place

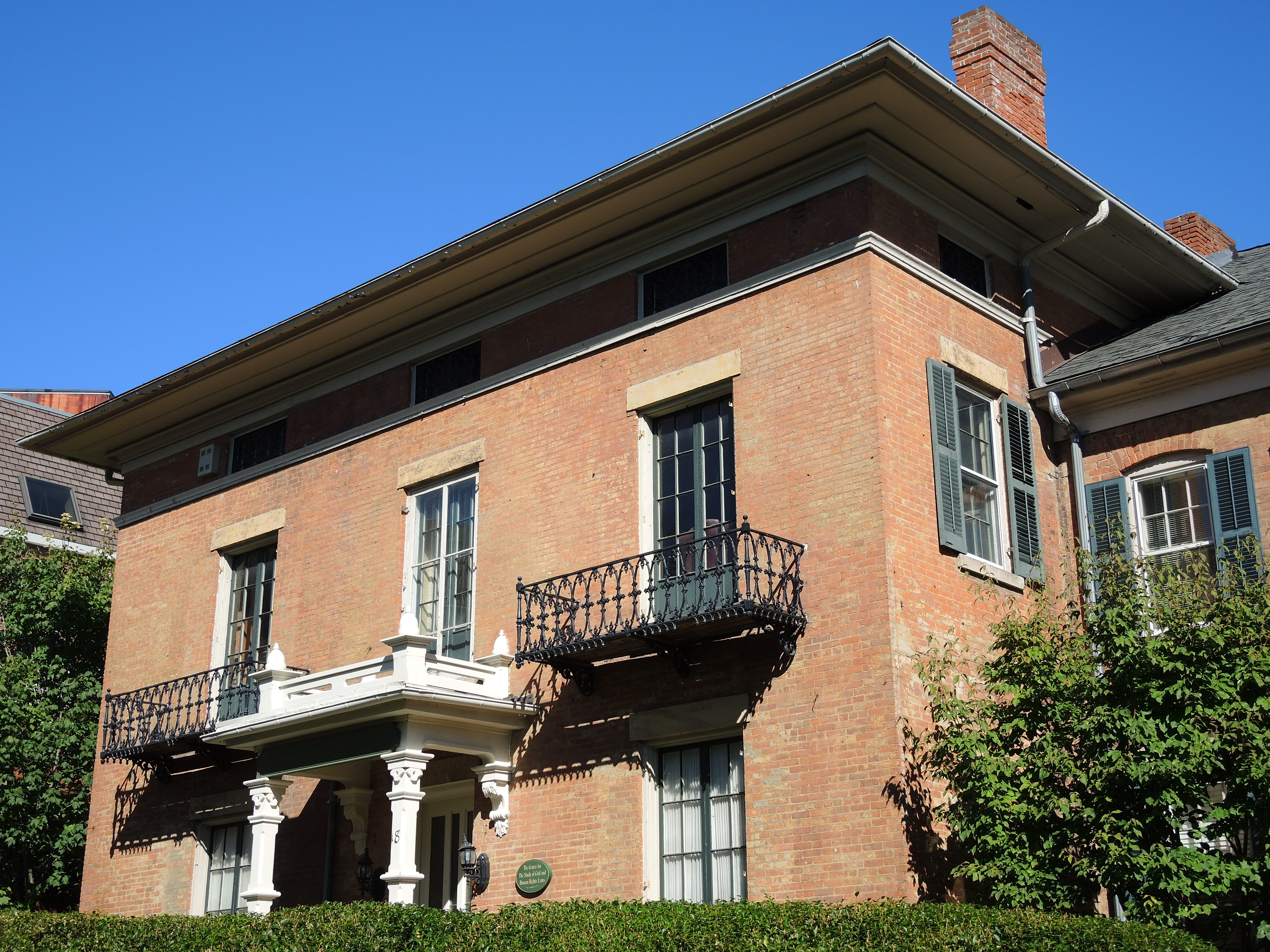
18 Grove Place

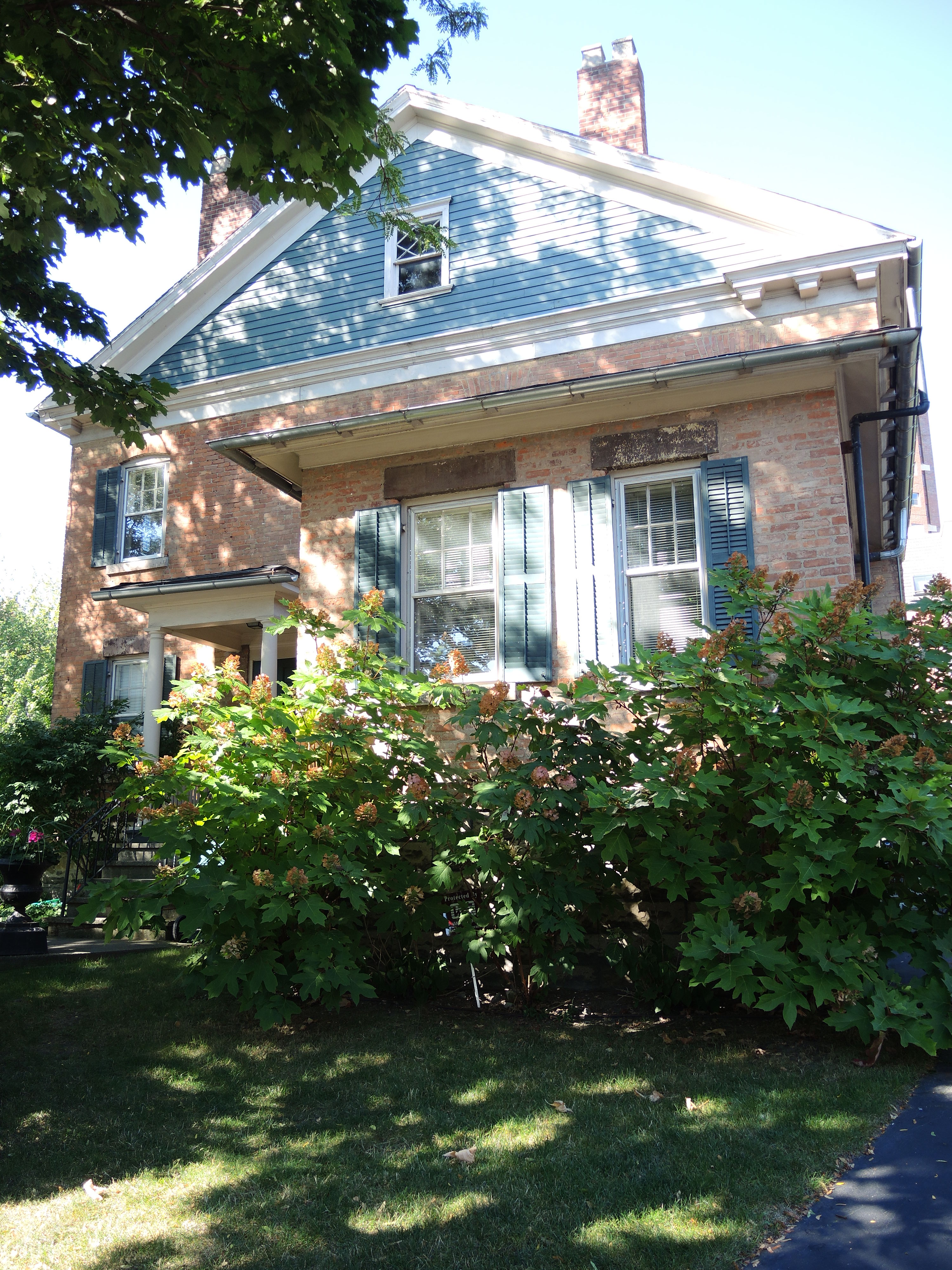
20 Grove Place, east side

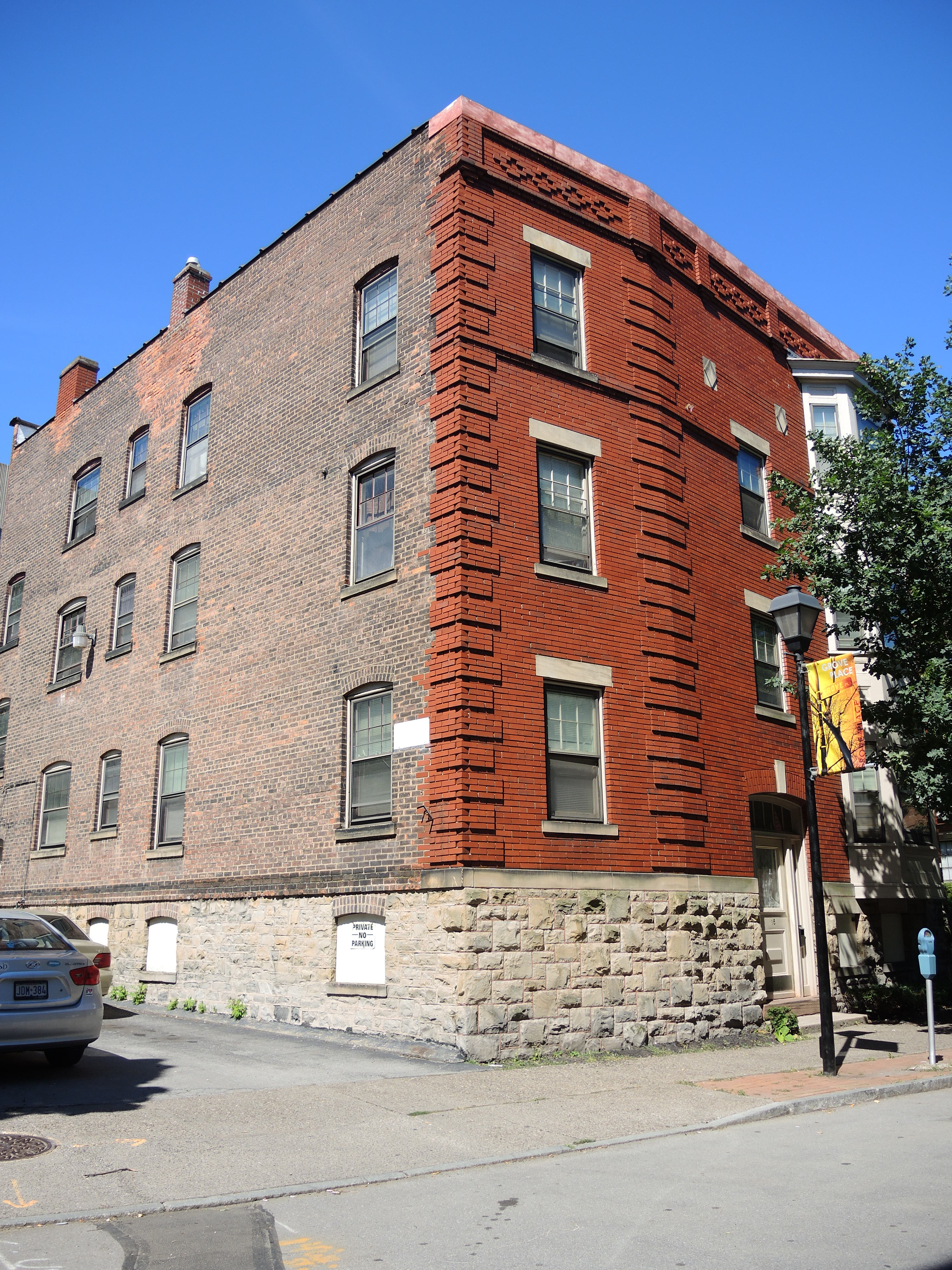
23 Grove Place
Selden Street

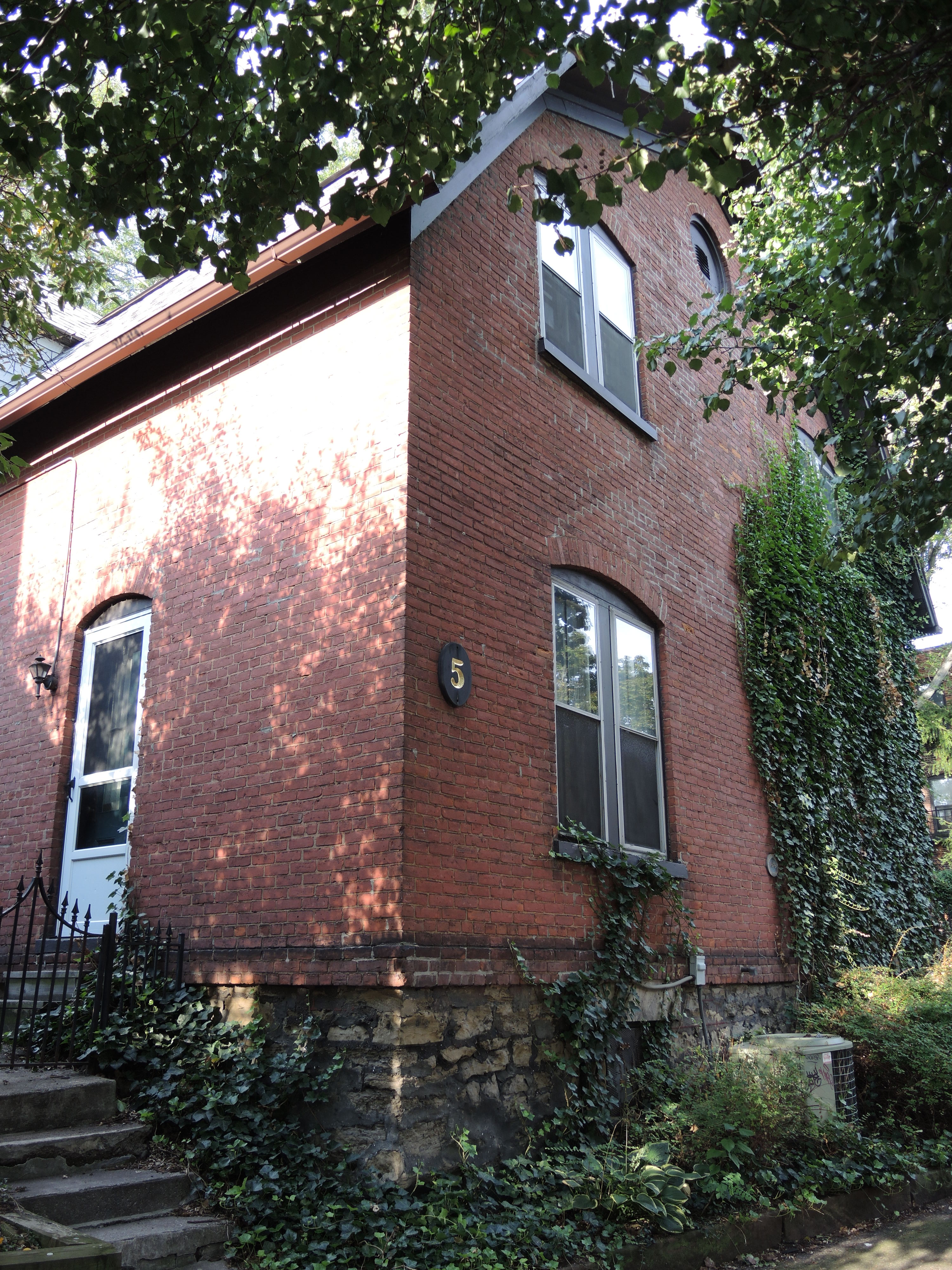
3 and 5 Selden Street, east side

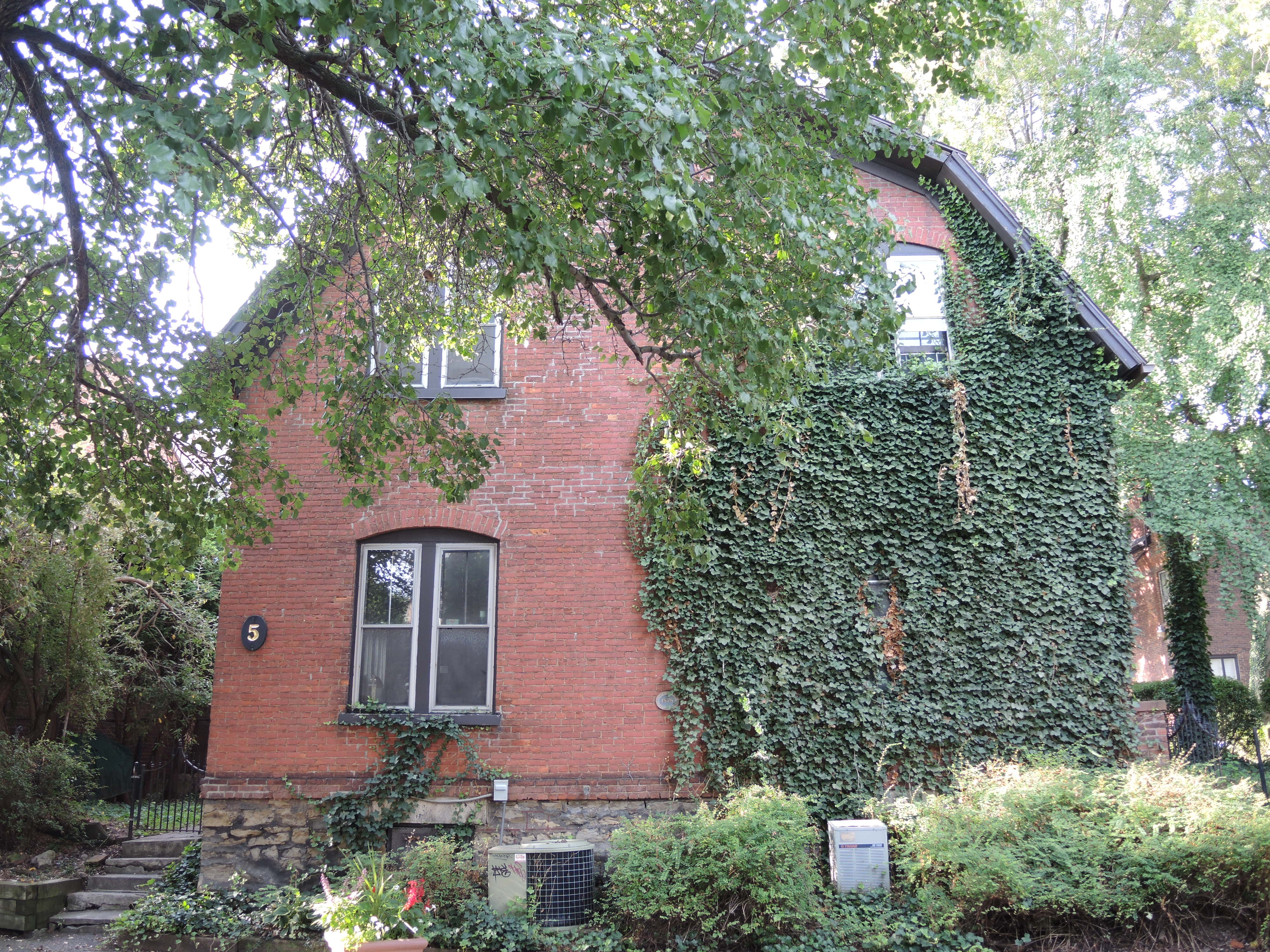
3 and 5 Selden Street, north side

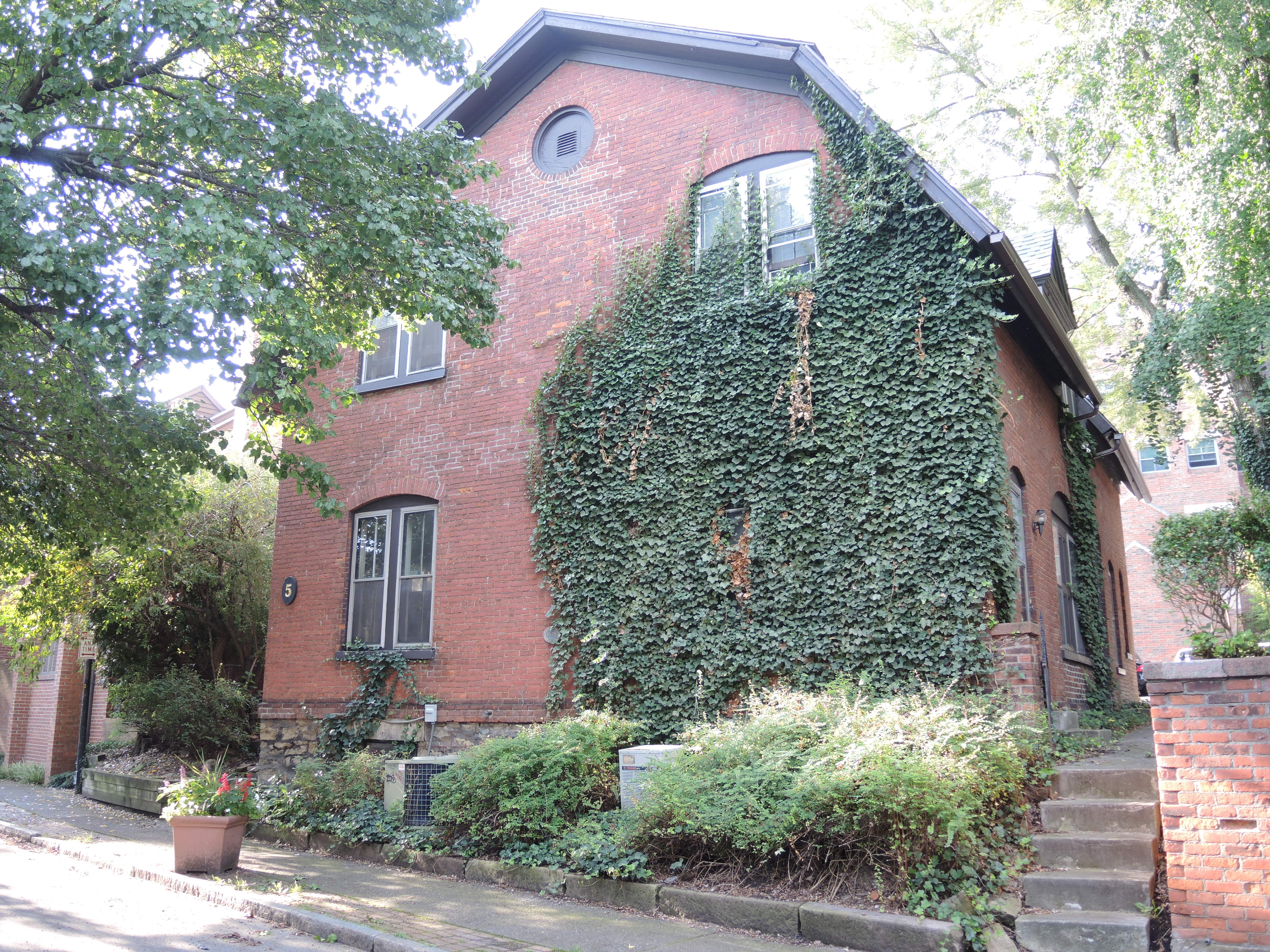
3 and 5 Selden Street, west side

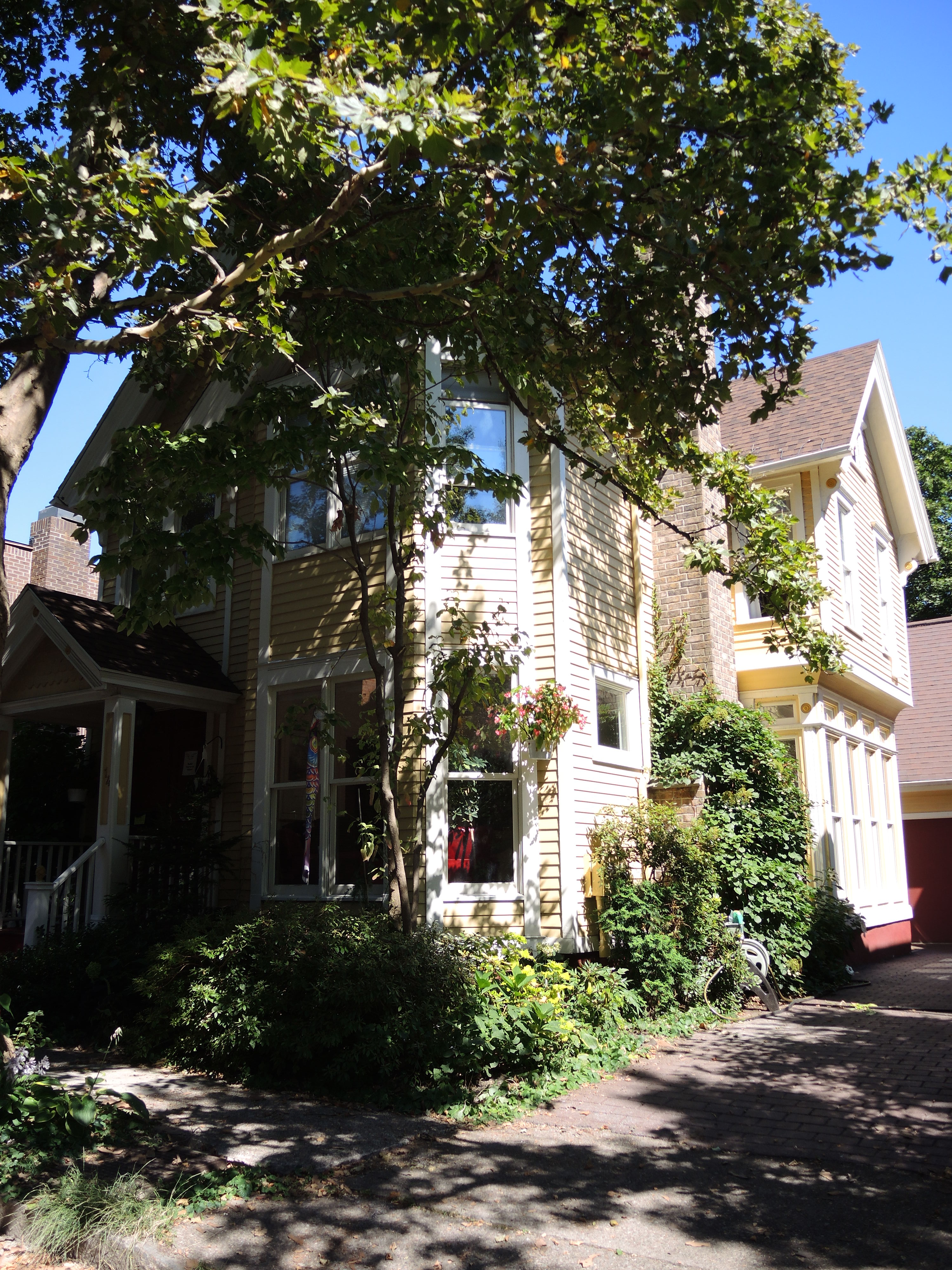
14 Selden Street, east side

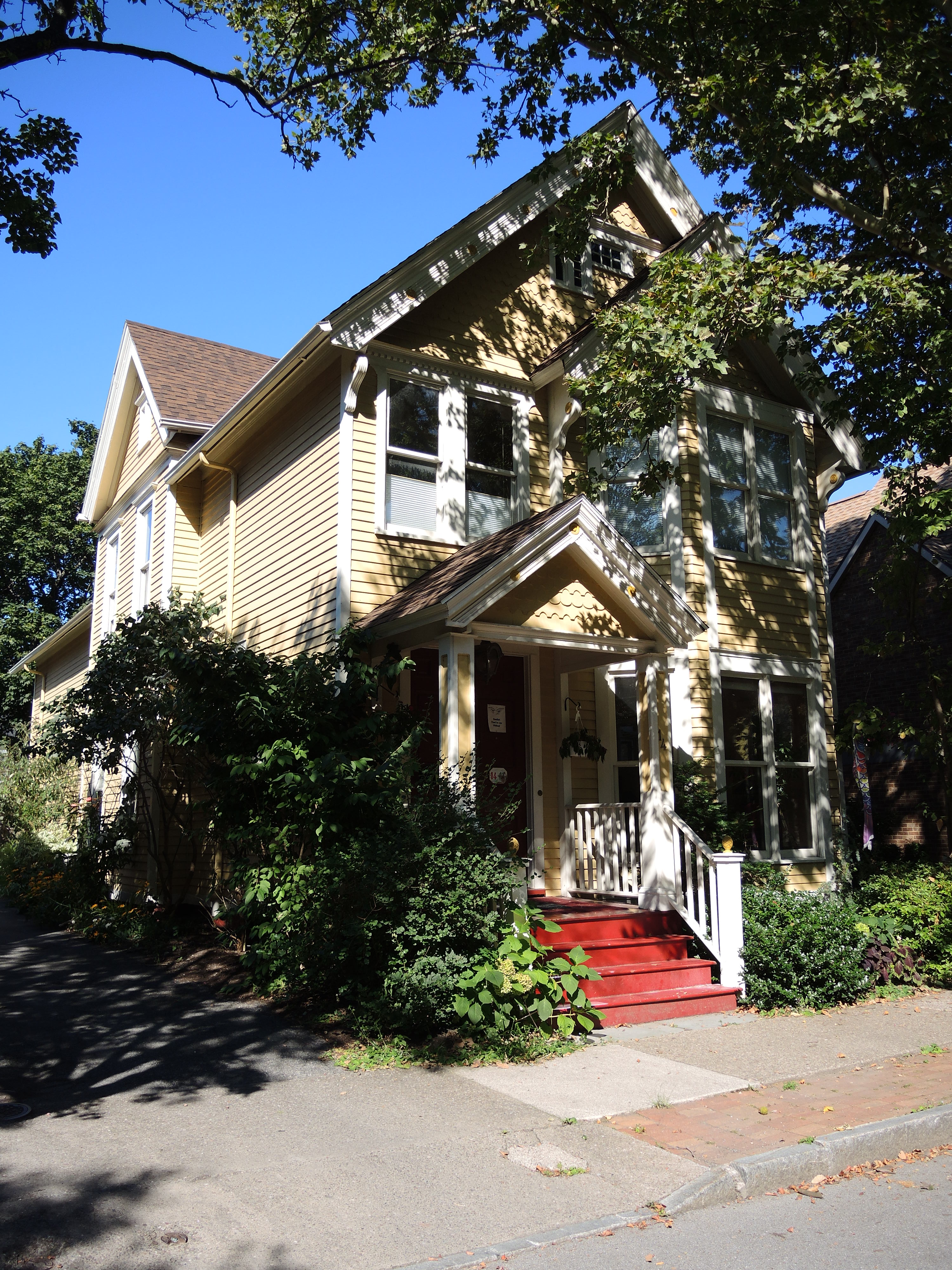
14 Selden Street, west side
Windsor Street

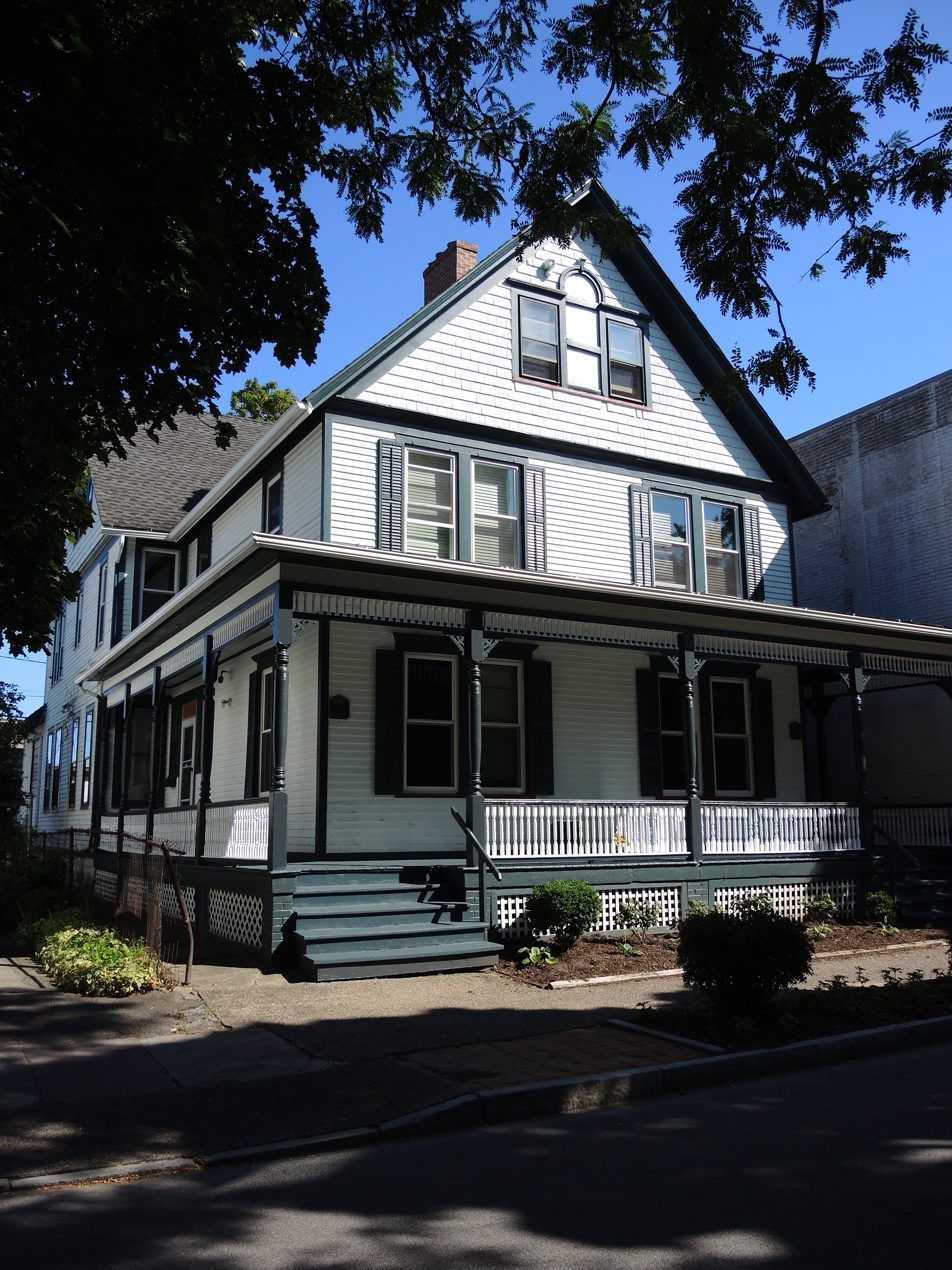
28 and 30 Windsor Street

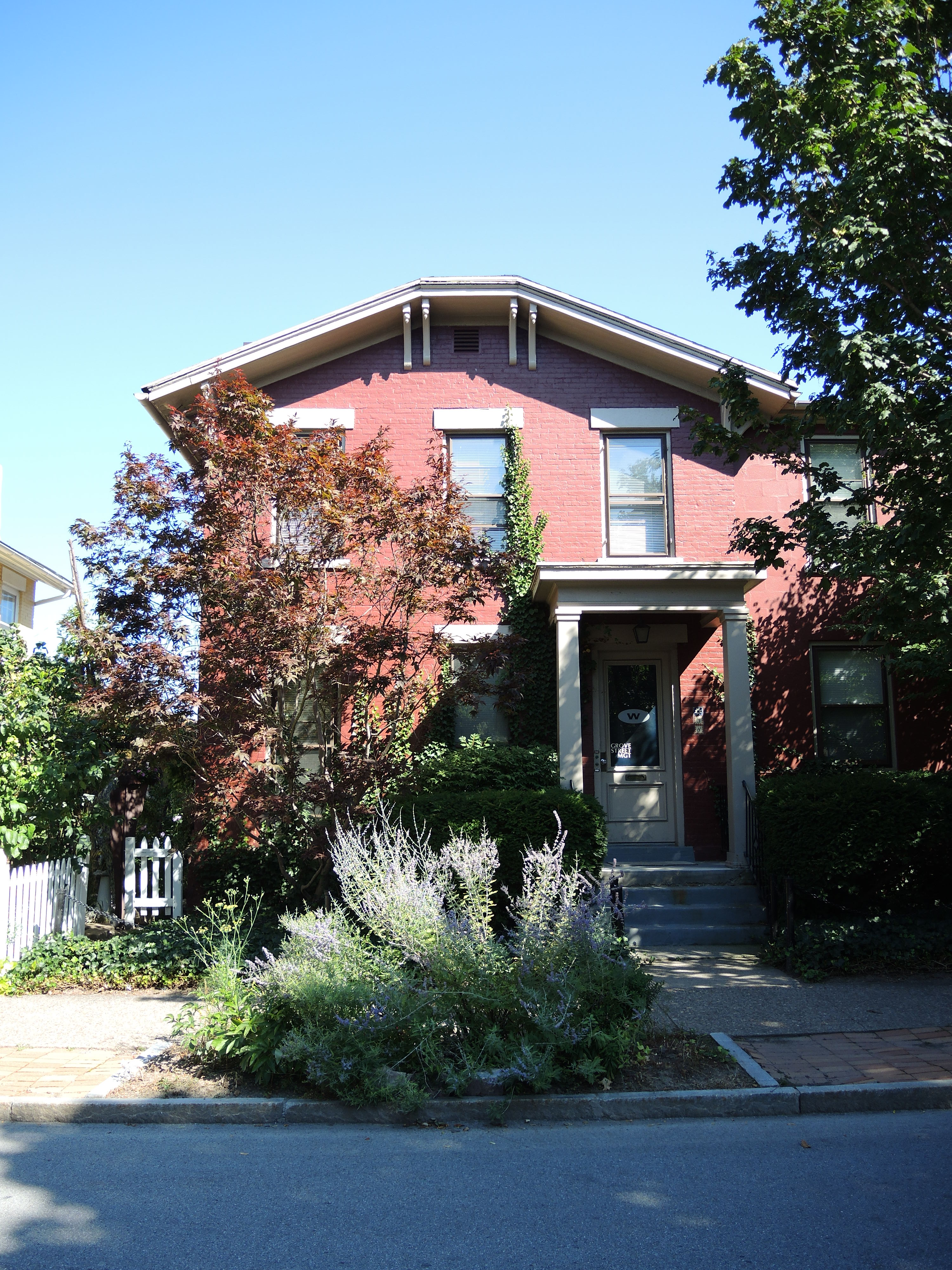
38 Windsor Street

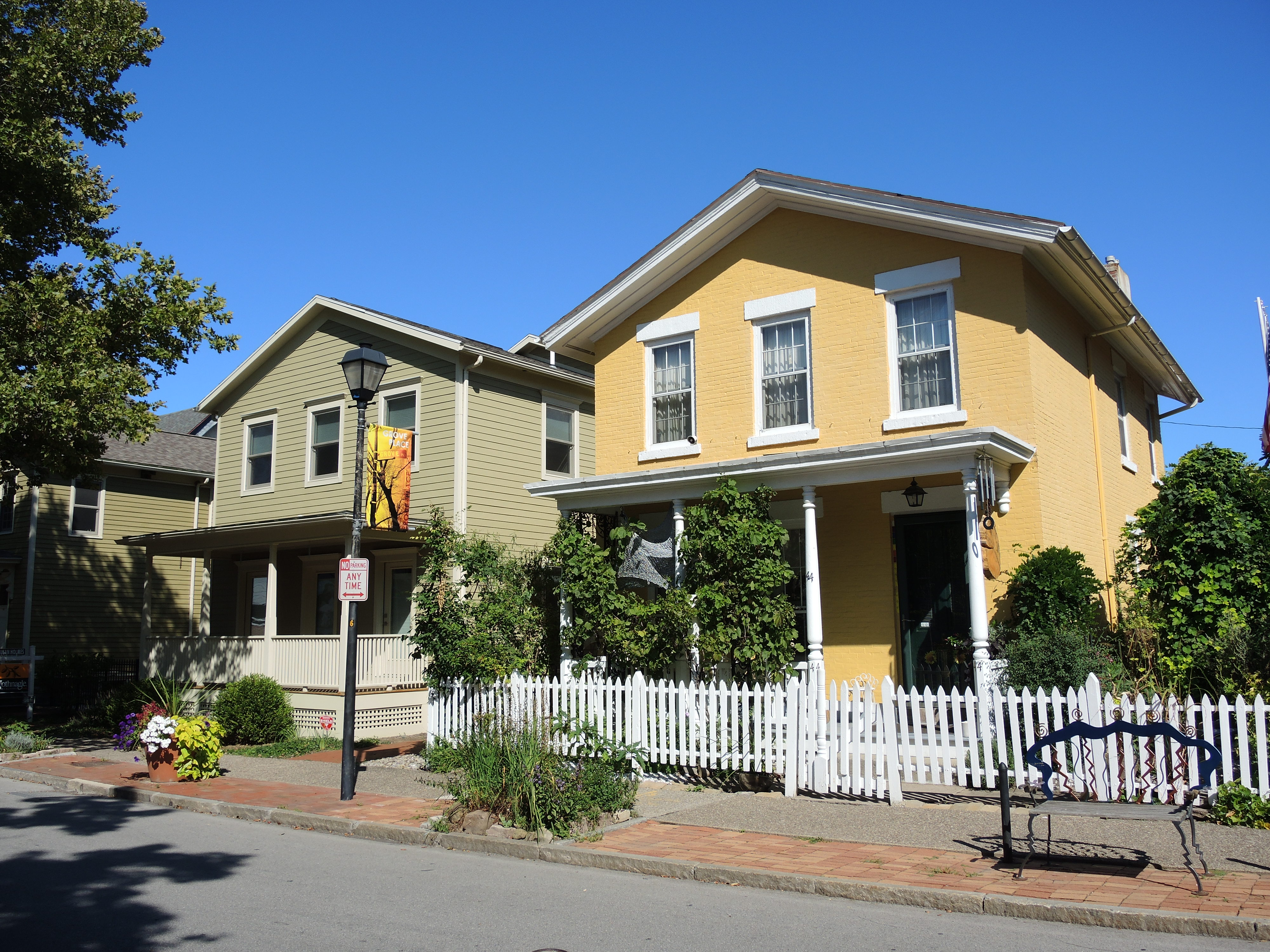
44 and 50 Windsor Street

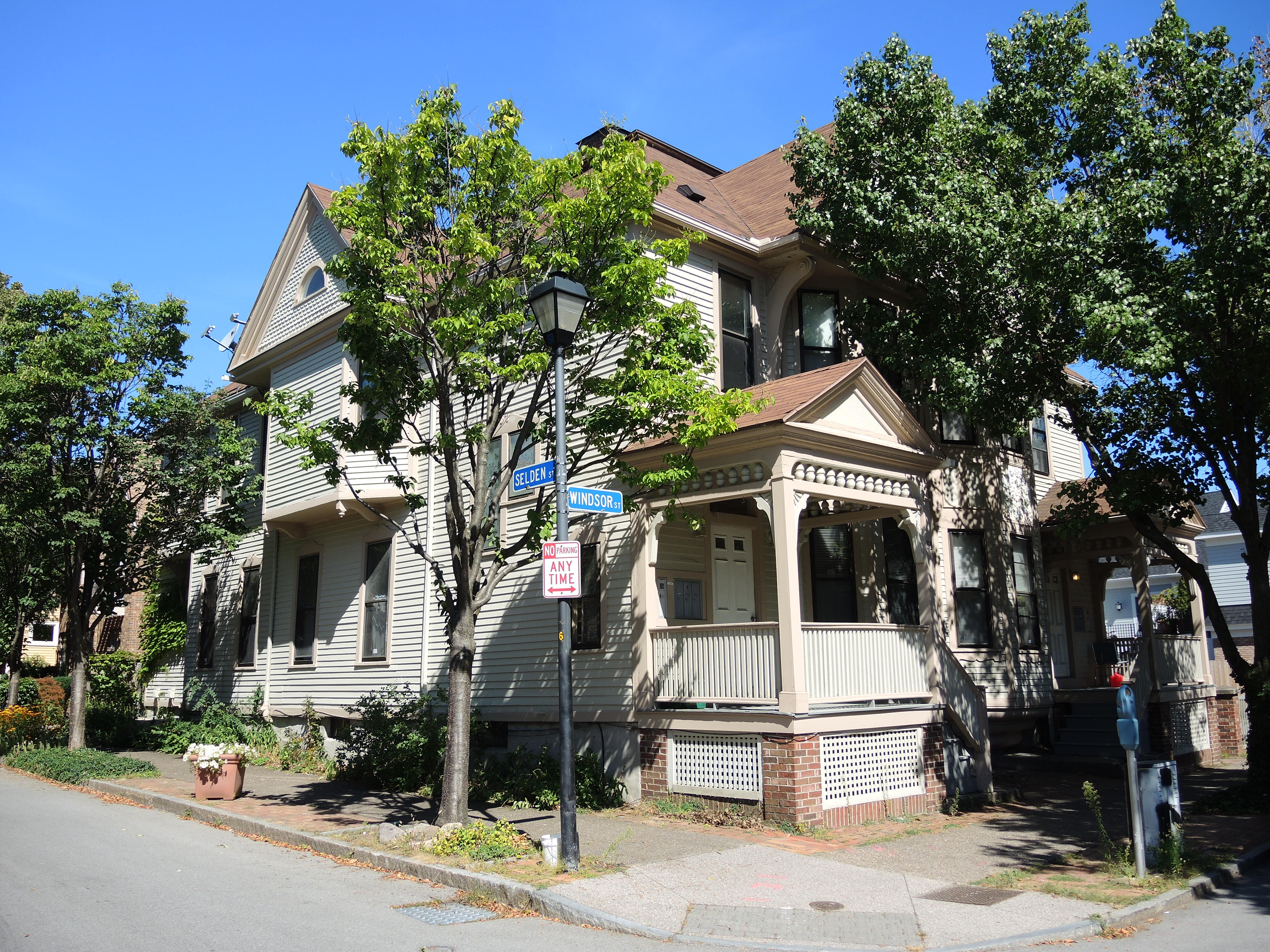
51 and 55 Windsor Street
