= Joseph Spencer (New York politician) =

American lawyer and politician

Joseph Spencer (1790 – May 2, 1823) was an American lawyer and politician from New York.

== Life ==
He was born in Hartford, Connecticut, the son of Isaac Spencer who was Connecticut State Treasurer from 1818 to 1835.

Joseph Spencer graduated from Yale College in 1811, then studied law, was admitted to the bar, and practiced in Rochester, New York. On September 24, 1814, he married Elizabeth Selden (b. 1797), a sister of Samuel L. Selden and Henry R. Selden. Their only child was Elizabeth Selden Spencer (b. 1819).

Spencer was a member of the New York State Senate (8th D.) in 1823, and died a few days after the end of the regular session of the Legislature in Albany, New York. His widow married Amos B. Eaton in 1831, and became the grandmother of Elizabeth Selden Rogers.

== Sources ==
- Hyde Genealogy by Reuben H. Walworth (1863; pg. 584)
- The New York Civil List compiled by Franklin Benjamin Hough (pages 125 and 145; Weed, Parsons and Co., 1858)
- Obit in The Washington Quarterly Magazine of Arts, Science and Literature edited by Robert Little (1823; Vol. 1; pg. 88)

New York State Senate
Preceded by none	New York State Senate; Eighth District (Class 4); 1823	Succeeded by John Bowman
