= Amos Beebe Eaton =

American Civil War officer

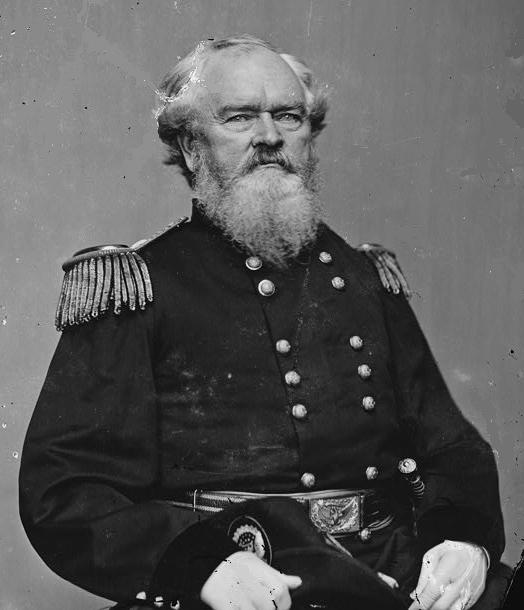
- General Amos B. Eaton
- Born: May 12, 1806; Catskill, New York
- Died: February 21, 1877 (aged 70); New Haven, Connecticut
- Burial place: Grove Street Cemetery, New Haven, Connecticut
- Relatives: Amos Eaton (father); Elizabeth Selden Rogers (granddaughter); Daniel Cady Eaton (son)
- Military career
- Allegiance: United States of America; Union
- Branch: United States Army; Union Army
- Service years: 1826–1874
- Rank: Brigadier General; Brevet Major General
- Conflicts: Second Seminole War; Mexican–American War; Battle of Buena Vista; American Civil War

Amos Beebe Eaton (May 12, 1806 – February 21, 1877) was a career officer in the United States Army, serving as a general for the Union during the American Civil War.

== Biography ==
Amos B. Eaton was born in Catskill, New York. He graduated from West Point in 1826; he was an infantry lieutenant until the Florida campaigns of the late 1830s. After that, his only fighting experiences took place in the Mexican–American War, for which service he was appointed a brevet major. Eaton served for 12 years as a field officer in the U.S. Army, then joined the commissary department for 23 years.

In March 1851, Eaton arrived in California and was assigned to the Pacific Division as head of Purchasing and Commissary of Subsistence in San Francisco. In December 1851, he served as a judge in the courts martial of George H. Derby and Joseph Hooker, the assistant adjutant general of the Pacific Division in Sonoma, California. Both faced charges of conduct unbecoming an officer and a gentleman: Derby for allowing a deserter to escape and Hooker for profiteering from the army.

Appointed a lieutenant colonel and assistant commissary general in 1861, Eaton was given the task of creating an effective supply system for the fledgling Union army. The large number of troops entering the Army at the beginning of the war was overloading the existing system. His work provisioning and distributing supplies to the troops led to President Abraham Lincoln's July 6, 1864, appointment of Eaton to the rank of brigadier general, U.S. Army, to rank from June 29, 1864. President Lincoln formally nominated Eaton for the appointment on June 30, 1864, and the U.S. Senate confirmed the appointment on July 2, 1864. Eaton took over the position of commissary general of the Regular Army at the same time due to the death of Brigadier General Joseph P. Taylor on June 29, 1864. On March 8, 1866, President Andrew Johnson nominated Eaton for appointment to the brevet grade of major general to rank from March 13, 1865, and the U.S. Senate confirmed the nomination on May 4, 1866, and re-confirmed it on July 14, 1866, in order to have line officers precede staff officers in rank.

He retired May 1, 1874, with the grade of brigadier general, USA, He was succeeded as commissary general of subsistence by Alexander E. Shiras. He then moved to New Haven, Connecticut. Eaton died in New Haven on February 21, 1877, and was buried there.

== Personal life ==
Eaton is the son of Amos Eaton and Sally Cady Eaton. His first cousin is Elizabeth Cady Stanton.

Eaton married Elizabeth Selden Spencer (1796-1868) on April 21, 1831. She was the widow of New York State Senator Joseph Spencer (New York politician). Elizabeth and Joseph had one daughter, Elizabeth Selden Spencer Colt (1819-1910). Elizabeth was the sister of New York State Lieutenant Governor Henry R. Selden and politician Samuel L. Selden. Amos and Elizabeth had three children: Ellen Dwight Eaton (1832-1907), Daniel Cady Eaton (1834-1895), and Frances Spencer Eaton (1836-1911).

Following his wife's death on May 8, 1868, Eaton remarried, on September 7, 1870, to Mary Isaacs Jerome Smith. She was the widow of Captain Ephraim Kirby Smith, who was killed in action near Mexico City, Mexico while serving in the United States Army during the Mexican-American War. Smith had three children of her own: Lieutenant Colonel Joseph Lee Smith Kirby, U.S. Army (1836-1862), who was killed in action during the United States Civil War in Corinth, Mississippi; Emma Jerome Kirby Blackwood (1840-1916); and Second Lieutenant George Geddes Kirby (1843-1875), an Ensign during the U.S. Civil War and later a lieutenant stationed in Wyoming who took his own life. Her second cousin twice removed was Winston Churchill.

His daughter Frances Spencer Eaton married Charles Atwood White, the great-grandson of American founding father Roger Sherman. They were the parents of U.S. Secretary of War Henry L. Stimson's wife, Mabel Wellington Stimson, and women's suffrage leader Elizabeth Selden Rogers.

His grandson, Dr. George Francis Eaton (son of Daniel), earned his Ph.D. from Yale University and was an instructor at that institution. His 3rd great-grandson, Staff Sergeant Richard Selden Eaton, Jr. (1966-2003), was a United States Army counterintelligence analyst who died in Iraq from illness while active service.

== See also ==
- List of American Civil War generals (Union)

== Archives and records ==
- U.S. Army Office of Assistant Commissary General of Subsistence records at Baker Library Special Collections, Harvard Business School.
