= Selden family =

The Selden family has a long history both in the United States and in England. The name originated from the ancient location of Selkeden in Eccleston, Sussex, England. The first known Selden in this family was John, born about 1210.

A subsequent John Selden, born in 1584, was a famous English jurist and member of the Long Parliament. John Milton referred to him as "the chief of learned men reputed in this Land." He was confined by the Sheriff of London due to his involvement with the Protestation of 1621, which resulted in the dissolution of Parliament. Several years later, because he helped draft and present the Petition of Right to the House of Lords in 1628, a document that objected to the overreach of authority by King Charles I of England and protested his infringement on the civil liberties of the people of England, he was imprisoned in the Tower of London. Selden published a number of scholarly works. His book "History of Tithes" was an important and influential account of the history of English law, leading some to call him the "father of Legal History." He also wrote "Mare Clausum," a significant treatise regarding the law of the sea.

Seldens were numbered among the early settlers of the original American colonies. Dorothy Selden married Stephen Hosmer; their son settled in Connecticut, another son James lived in Concord, Massachusetts. The Selden name in America was carried by Thomas Selden (b. 1616/17; d. aft Aug 1655) and by Samuel Selden (b. 1662; d. 1720). The Selden family is among the First Families of Virginia.

== Notable people of Selden descent ==
- Col. Samuel Selden (January 11, 1723 - October 11, 1776)
- Rev. Miles Selden (1726 - March 20, 1785), rector of St. John's Episcopal Church, Richmond, Virginia when Patrick Henry gave his memorable speech at the Second Virginia Convention
- Dudley Selden (1794 – November 7, 1855), Member of the U.S. House of Representatives
- Morrison Remick Waite (November 29, 1816 – March 23, 1888), son of Maria Selden and Chief Justice of the United States Supreme Court
- Samuel L. Selden (October 12, 1800 - September 20, 1876), Chief Judge of the New York Court of Appeals
- Henry R. Selden (October 14, 1805 – September 18, 1885), Abraham Lincoln's first choice for vice president
- George B. Selden (September 14, 1846 – January 17, 1922), Henry Selden's son, possibly first to patent the automobile
- Arthur Selden Lloyd (May 3, 1857 – July 22, 1936), bishop and president of the Board of Missions of the Episcopal Church
- Dixie Selden (February 28, 1868 – November 15, 1935), artist
- Armistead Selden (February 20, 1921 – November 14, 1985), Member of the U.S. House of Representatives and Ambassador to New Zealand, Fiji, and other islands
