= Selden =

Selden may refer to:

== Places ==
In the United States:

- Fort Selden, in New Mexico
- Selden, Kansas
- Selden, New York

In Switzerland:

- Selden (Kandersteg)

== Other uses ==
- Selden (surname)
- Selden, character from Conan Doyle's The Hound of the Baskervilles
- Selden Motor Vehicle Company, an early automobile manufacturer

== See also ==
- Seldon (disambiguation)
- Justice Selden (disambiguation)
