= Selden (surname) =

Selden is a surname, that is mainly found in the United Kingdom and the United States.

== People ==
- Anjelica Selden, American softballer
- Annie Selden, American expert in mathematics education
- Armistead I. Selden (1921–1985), American politician
- Brian Selden, winner of the 1998 Magic: The Gathering World Championship
- Catherine Selden, Gothic novelist of the early 19th century
- David Selden (1914–1998), American activist
- Dixie Selden (1868–1935) American artist
- Dudley Selden, member of U.S. House of Representatives from New York
- George Selden (author) (1929–1989), American author
- George B. Selden (1846–1922), American inventor
- Henry R. Selden (1805–1885), New York Lt. Gov. 1857–1858
- John Selden (1584–1654), English jurist and scholar
- Samuel L. Selden (1800–1876), Chief Judge of the New York Court of Appeals 1862
- Wayne Selden Jr. (born 1994), American basketball player
- William Selden (1831–1850), U.S. Treasurer, who served under six presidents

== Fictional characters ==
- Lawrence Selden, a character in Edith Wharton's novel, The House of Mirth
