= Randolph B. Marcy =

Union Army general (1812–1887)

Randolph Barnes Marcy
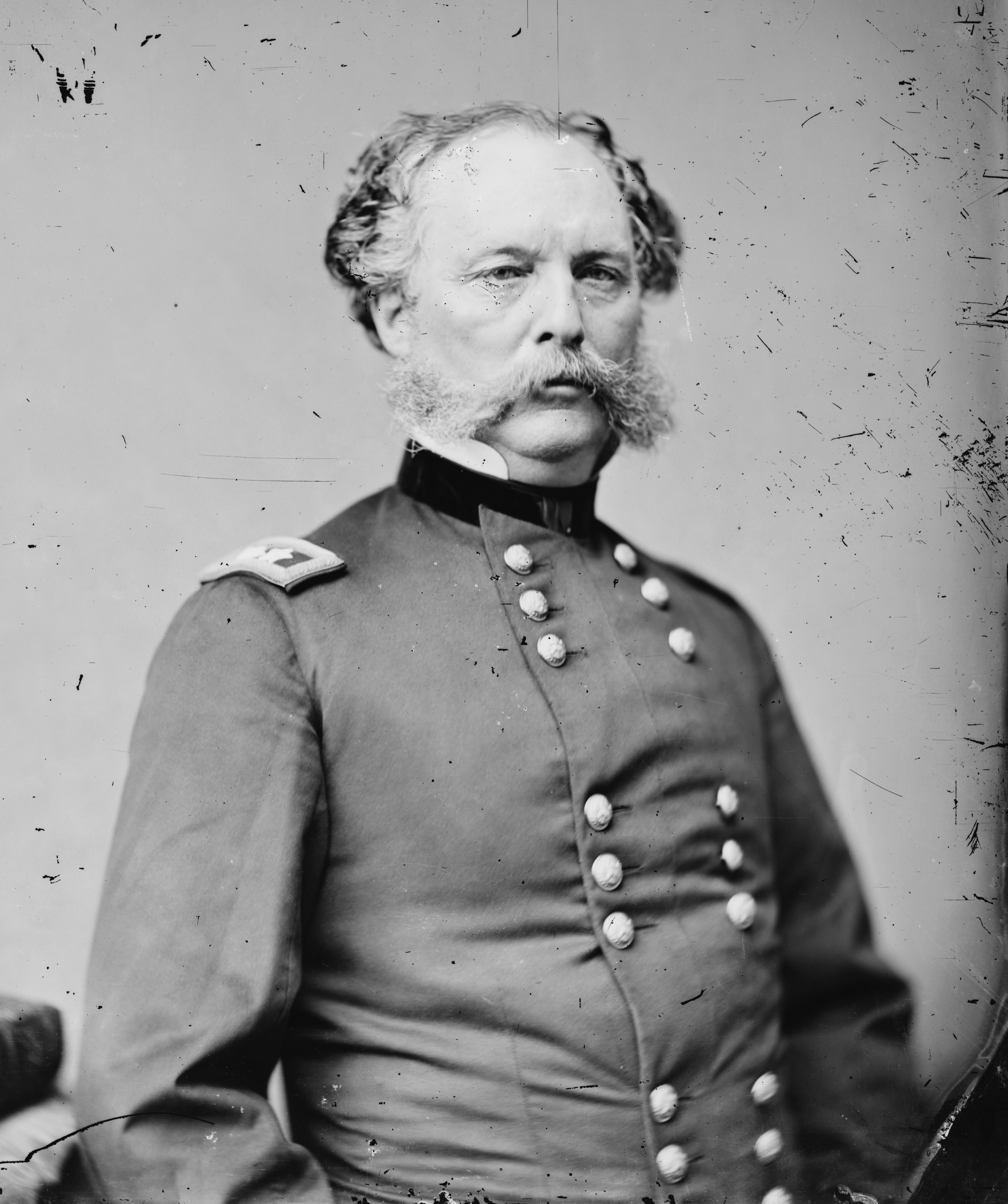
- Randolph B. Marcy
- Born: April 9, 1812; Greenwich, Massachusetts
- Died: November 22, 1887 (aged 75); West Orange, New Jersey
- Burial place: Riverview Cemetery; Trenton, New Jersey
- Military career
- Allegiance: United States of America; Union
- Branch: United States Army; Union Army
- Service years: 1832–1881
- Rank: Brigadier General; Brevet Major General
- Unit: 5th U.S. Infantry
- Commands: Inspector General of the U.S. Army
- Conflicts: Black Hawk War; Mexican–American War; Battle of Palo Alto; Battle of Resaca de la Palma; Third Seminole War; Utah War; American Civil War; Western Virginia campaign; Peninsula campaign; Maryland campaign
- Other work: Author

Randolph Barnes Marcy (April 9, 1812 – November 22, 1887) was an officer in the United States Army, chiefly noted for his frontier guidebook, the Prairie Traveler (1859), based on his own extensive experience of pioneering in the west. This publication became a key handbook for the thousands of Americans wanting to cross the continent. In the Civil War, Marcy became chief of staff to his son-in-law George B. McClellan, and was later appointed Inspector General of the U.S. Army.

== Biography ==
Marcy was born in Greenwich, Massachusetts, and graduated from the United States Military Academy at West Point in 1832 as a lieutenant in the 5th U.S. Infantry. He married soon afterwards, and one of his children, Ellen Mary, would later marry future General-in-Chief George B. McClellan.

Marcy first saw combat while serving in the Black Hawk War in Illinois and Wisconsin. He was promoted Captain in the Mexican War, and fought at Palo Alto and Resaca de la Palma. He was then assigned to duty in Texas and Oklahoma, where he escorted emigrants, located military posts, explored the wilderness, and mapped routes. In 1852, he was in charge of the expedition that first reached the headwaters of both forks of the Red River. (It was on this expedition that he met McClellan.)

In 1857, Marcy accompanied Brigadier General Albert Sidney Johnston on the expedition against the Mormons in Utah. Here he distinguished himself on a forced march through the Rockies in midwinter, when he led his troops to safety after they had run out of provisions for two weeks. Meanwhile, his achievements and well-written military reports had attracted attention in Washington, and he was recalled to work for the Department of State. Here, he prepared his acclaimed guidebook to the western trails, The Prairie Traveler: A Handbook for Overland Expeditions, with Maps, Illustrations, and Itineraries of the Principal Routes between the Mississippi and the Pacific.

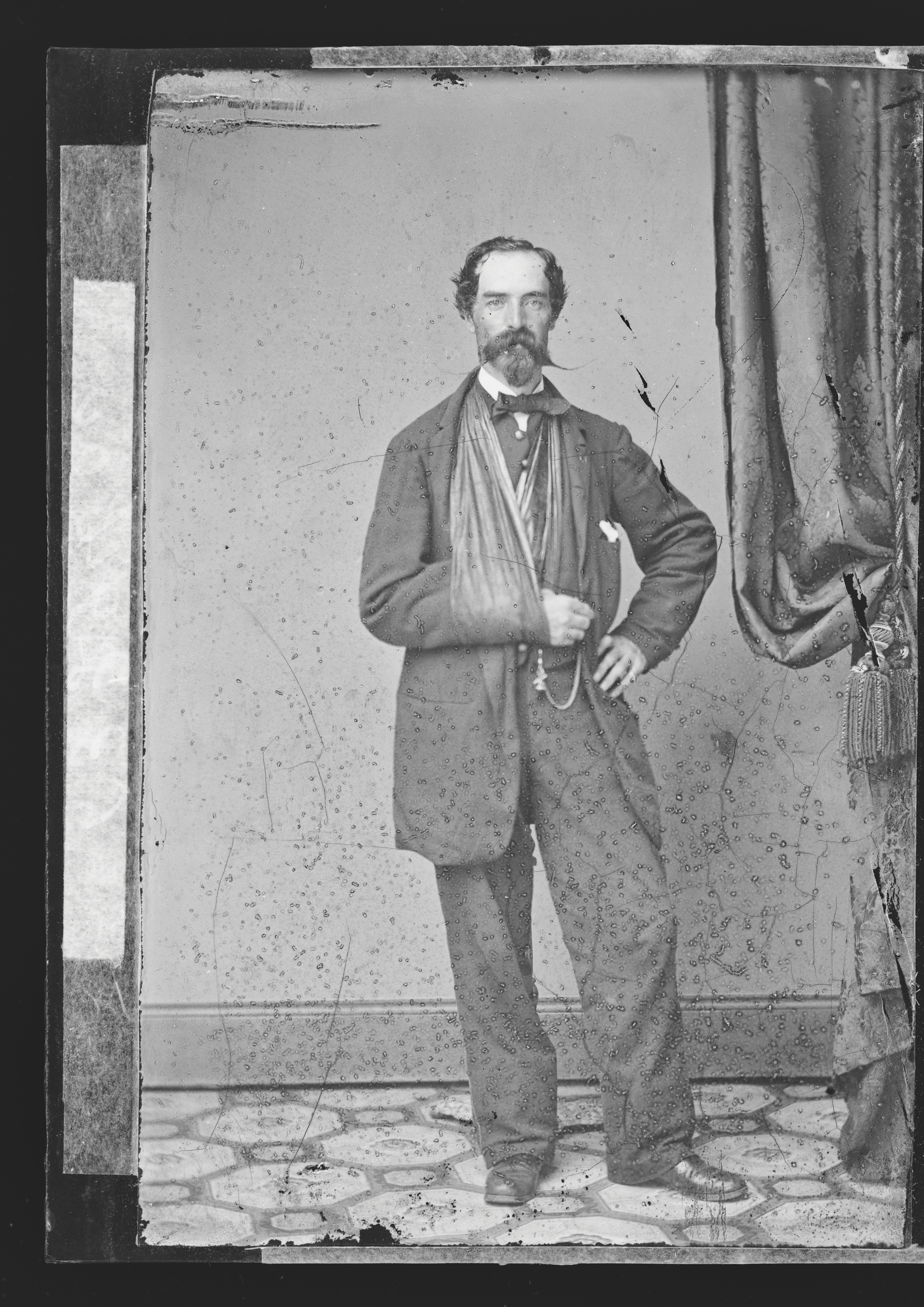
Randolph B. Marcy by Brady

Published by the U.S. Government in 1859, the Prairie Traveler quickly became an indispensable guide for the thousands of Americans wanting to reach California, Oregon, Utah, and other destinations.

Based on his own extensive experience of "more than thirty years of service in the United States Army, a large portion of the time on the frontiers" and in the mountains, deserts, and prairies, the book provided authoritative advice about reconnaissance, fieldcraft, provisions and healthcare, that would save many lives on these perilous routes. It covered key topics like food and water supply and hunting and tracking, and provided specialist advice about the selection of horses, avoiding quicksand, interpreting smoke signals and sign language, and numerous other issues. It was a best-selling book for the remainder of the century. Andrew J. Birtle, author of U.S. Army Counterinsurgency and Contingency Operations Doctrine 1860-1941, has described the Prairie Traveler as "perhaps the single most important work on the conduct of frontier expeditions published under the aegis of the War Department."

After completing this work, Marcy was promoted to the rank of major and posted to the Pacific Northwest, where he was assigned as paymaster. At the start of the Civil War, he returned East and served as chief of staff to McClellan, by then his son-in-law. In 1861, he succeeded Henry Lee Scott as Inspector General of the U.S. Army. Marcy was brevetted major general of volunteers in 1868 (back-dated to 1865) and became a brigadier general of the U.S. Army in 1878. He continued his service until he retired in 1881. He died at West Orange, New Jersey in 1887

== Legacy ==
Fort Marcy Park in McLean, Virginia, was named for General Marcy.

A species of garter snake, Thamnophis marcianus, is named in his honor.

=== Texas Historical Commission Sites ===
During the twentieth century, numerous historical markers were placed by the Texas Historical Commission recognizing the Marcy Trail prairie routes through Indian Territory and Texas while establishing the Fort Smith - Santa Fe Trail of 1849.

◇ "Capt. R.B. Marcy Trail ~ Texas Historic Marker: 3204" [Near Haskell in Haskell County, Texas - The American South (West South Central)]. HMDB.org. The Historical Marker Database. 1934.
◇ "The Fort Smith-Santa Fe Trail Marcy Route, 1849 - Amarillo - Potter County ~ Marker Number: 2019". Texas Historic Sites Atlas. Texas Historical Commission. 1965.
◇ "Route of Marcy's Trail - Big Spring - Howard County ~ Marker Number: 15634". Texas Historic Sites Atlas. Texas Historical Commission. 1966.
◇ "Marcy Trail ~ Texas Historic Marker: 3206" [Near Midland in Midland County, Texas - The American South (West South Central)]. HMDB.org. The Historical Marker Database. 1967.
◇ "Marcy Trail - Windthorst - Archer County ~ Marker Number: 3207". Texas Historic Sites Atlas. Texas Historical Commission. 1967.
◇ "Capt. Randolph Marcy's Exploration Route through Collingsworth County ~ Texas Historic Marker: 13474" [Near Wellington in Collingsworth County, Texas - The American South (West South Central)]. HMDB.org. The Historical Marker Database. 2006.
◇ "Captain Randolph B. Marcy's Southern Route Expedition - Odessa - Ector County ~ Marker Number: 17985". Texas Historic Sites Atlas. Texas Historical Commission. 2014.

Texas Historical Markers for Marcy Trail

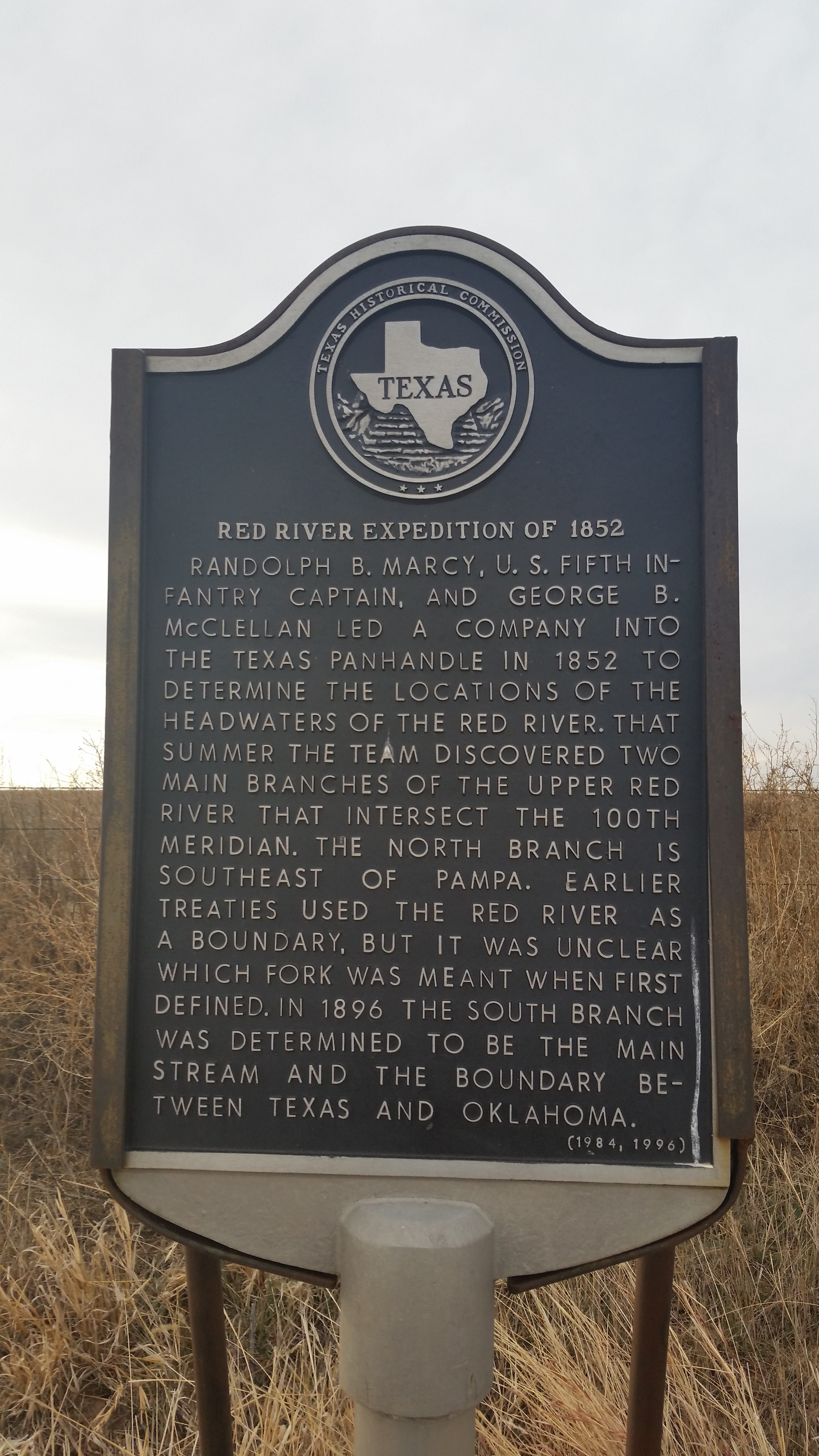
Texas historical marker for Red River Expedition of 1852

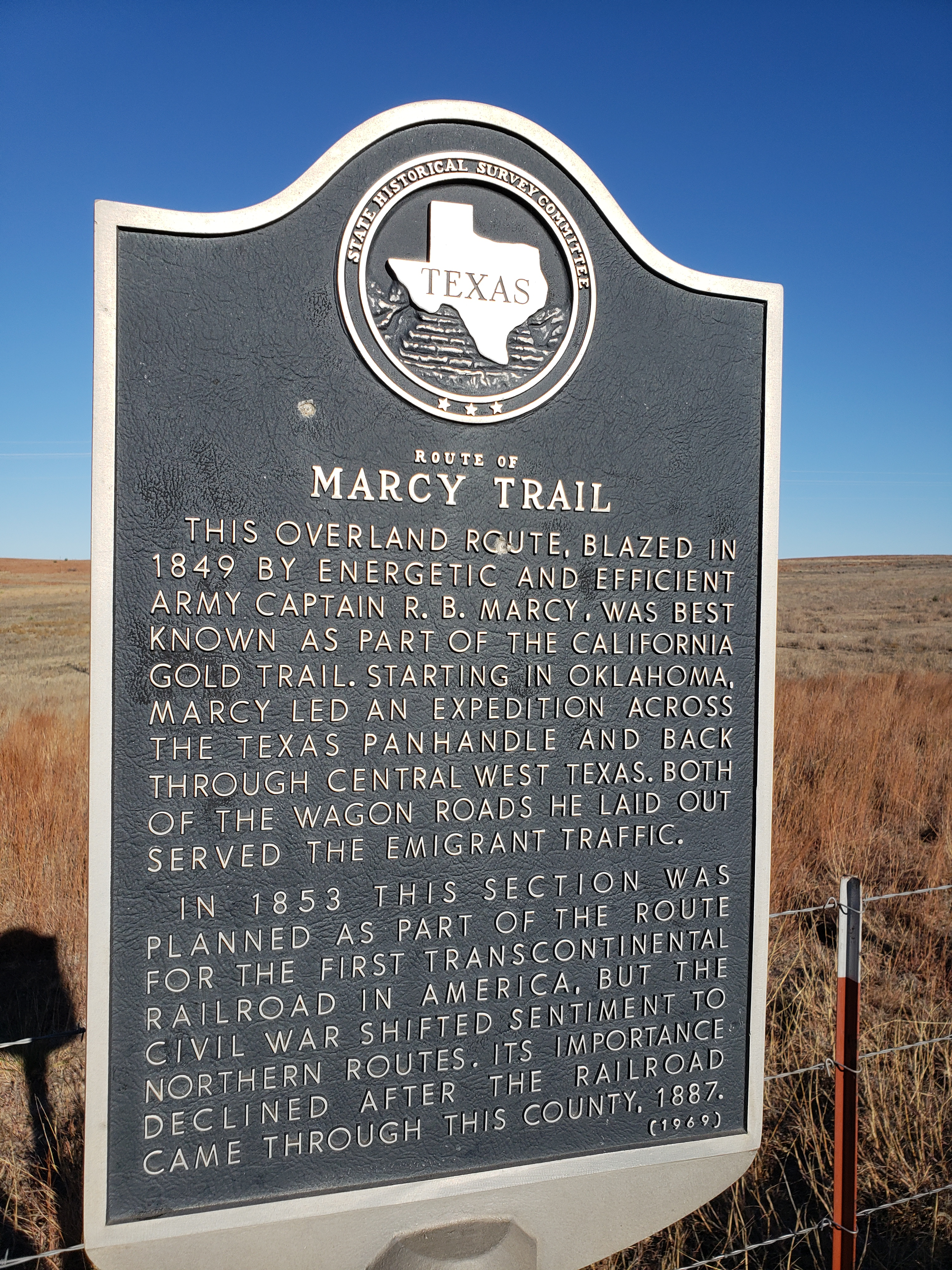
Texas historical marker for 1849 Route of Marcy Trail

== See also ==
☆ List of American Civil War generals (Union)	☆ California Road
☆ List of Massachusetts generals in the American Civil War	☆ Double Mountains
☆ Massachusetts in the American Civil War	☆ Josiah Gregg

Military offices
Preceded by vacant	Inspector General of the U. S. Army; September 25, 1861-January 2, 1881	Succeeded by Delos B. Sacket
