= Seldon =

Seldon may refer to:

== Places ==
- Fort Seldon, a US Cavalry fort in New Mexico

== People ==
- Robert Seldon Lady (born 1954), noted member of the U.S. intelligence community
- Anthony Seldon (born 1953), British biographer and historian
- Arthur Seldon (1916–2005), joint founder president of the Institute of Economic Affairs
- Bruce Seldon (born 1967), American boxer
- Myma Seldon (born 1979), British television - and radio presenter and voiceover artist
- Seldon Connor (1839–1917), thirty-fifth governor of the U.S. state of Maine
- Seldon Powell (1928–1997), American soul jazz, swing and R&B tenor saxophonist and flautist

== Companies ==
- Seldon (company), a British technology company

== Characters ==
- Hari Seldon, the intellectual hero of Isaac Asimov's Foundation Series
- Raych Seldon, the adopted son of Hari Seldon and Dors Venabili
- Wanda Seldon, the daughter of Raych Seldon and Manella Dubanqua

== Fictional Concepts ==
- Seldon Plan, the central theme of Isaac Asimov's Foundation Series
- Seldon Crisis, a fictional socio-historical phenomenon in Isaac Asimov's Foundation Series

== See also ==
Selden (disambiguation)
