= Elizabeth Rogers (disambiguation) =

Elizabeth Rogers is the name of:

- Elizabeth Rogers (1934–2004), American actress
- Elizabeth Barlow Rogers, American landscape preservationist
- Elizabeth Selden Rogers (1868–1950), American civil reformer
