= Justice Selden =

Justice Selden may refer to:

- Henry R. Selden (1805–1885), judge of the New York Court of Appeals
- Samuel L. Selden (1800–1876), chief judge of the New York Court of Appeals
