= Jacob De Witt (disambiguation) =

Jacob de Witt is the name of:

- Jacob de Witt (1589—1674), Dutch burgomaster of Dordrecht
- Jacob de Wit (1695–1754), Dutch interior painter from Amsterdam
- Jacob H. De Witt (1784—1867), United States Representative from New York
- Jacob De Witt (1785—1859), Quebec businessman and political figure
- Jacob de Witt (comics), a fictional villain from DC Comics
