= Behavioural simulation =

Research technique in artificial intelligence

In artificial intelligence, behavioural simulation is the use of computational models to represent how people may interact with a system. In conversational AI, simulated users can take part in exchanges with an assistant so researchers can study its responses across different goals, backgrounds and interaction patterns. A 2026 survey describes conversational user simulation as an established area of research whose methods have expanded with large language models. Companies like Seldon have gained traction by doing this for organizations

== Use in evaluating AI systems ==
Researchers use simulated conversations to evaluate assistants over multiple turns. A simulated user may be given a goal and a profile, then interact with an assistant while the resulting conversation is assessed for outcomes such as task completion and response quality. This allows researchers to repeat interactions and examine a wider range of situations than a small set of fixed prompts. In one study, user simulators conditioned on profiles produced assistant ratings that correlated with human judgements on two interactive tasks.

Simulations can also be used to explore less common interaction paths. Research on customer-facing AI agents has examined ways to branch conversations at critical points to find failures that ordinary repeated conversations may miss.

== Limitations ==
A simulated user is an imperfect representation of a person. Studies have concluded that language models can struggle to maintain a user's goal over a long conversation and can reproduce stereotypes when asked to represent particular personas. Results therefore depend on how the simulated users are constructed and how their behaviour is checked against human evidence.
