= New York circuit courts =

The New York circuit courts were circuit courts created by the New York State Constitution of 1821, and abolished by the Constitution of 1846.

== History ==
Under the provisions of the Constitution of New York, 1777, the justices of the New York Supreme Court had been holding traveling circuit courts. Under the Constitution of 1821, the state was divided in eight senatorial districts, so known because each district elected four senators, which were also used as judicial divisions. The circuit courts were organized by an act passed April 17, 1823. The circuit court judges were appointed by the Governor and confirmed by the State Senate. The circuit courts ceased to exist on July 5, 1847, when the jurisdiction was taken over by the district benches of the New York Supreme Court the justices of which had been elected at the special judicial election in May 1847.

== List of judges ==
=== First Circuit ===
- 1823–1841 Ogden Edwards
- 1841–1845 William Kent
- 1845–1847 John W. Edmonds

=== Second Circuit ===
- 1823–1827 Samuel Betts
- 1827–1831 James Emott
- 1831–1846 Charles H. Ruggles
- 1846 Selah B. Strong (declined)
- 1846–1847 Seward Barculo

=== Third Circuit ===
- 1823–1830 William Alexander Duer
- 1830–1838 James Vanderpoel
- 1838–1844 John P. Cushman
- 1844–1847 Amasa J. Parker

=== Fourth Circuit ===
- 1823–1828 Reuben H. Walworth
- 1828–1836 Esek Cowen
- 1838–1847 John Willard

=== Fifth Circuit ===
- 1823–1834 Nathan Williams
- 1834 Samuel Beardsley
- 1834–1838 Hiram Denio
- 1838 Isaac H. Bronson
- 1838–1847 Philo Gridley

=== Sixth Circuit ===
- 1823–1831 Samuel Nelson
- 1831–1846 Robert Monell
- 1846–1847 Hiram Gray

=== Seventh Circuit ===
- 1823–1828 Enos Throop
- 1829–1844 Daniel Moseley
- 1844–1847 Bowen Whiting

=== Eighth Circuit ===
- 1823–1826 William B. Rochester
- 1826 Albert H. Tracy (declined)
- 1826–1829 John Birdsall
- 1829–1838 Addison Gardiner
- 1838 John B. Skinner
- 1838–1847 Nathan Dayton
