= 1847 New York special judicial election =

At a special judicial election on June 7, 1847, four judges of the New York Court of Appeals, the Clerk of the Court of Appeals, 32 justices of the new New York Supreme Court district benches, county judges, surrogates, district attorneys and all other judicial officers in the state of New York were elected, to take office on July 5, 1847.

== Background ==
The New York State Constitution of 1846 re-organized the State's judicial system and created the Court of Appeals. Four of the judges were elected statewide, the other four were chosen by a rotative system from the New York Supreme Court district benches.

The Whig state convention met on May 19 at Syracuse, New York, and nominated Whittlesey, Noxon, Reynolds and David Lord. Lord declined the nomination, and Jordan was substituted on the ticket.

== Results ==
The votes are the total of Democratic and Anti-Rent votes for Gardiner and Bronson, and the total of Whig and Anti-Rent votes for Jordan, Whittlesey and Lamport. The Anti-Rent endorsement did not influence the result of this election.

The official result did not count the votes from Hamilton County, which were not returned, and 1,011 votes for Whittlesey in Herkimer County, which were cast for "Frederick W. Whittlesey".

The whole Democratic ticket was elected. Those elected were then classified by drawing lots on June 22. Jewett drew the two-year term, Bronson the four-year term, Ruggles the six-year term, and Gardiner the eight-year term. The half year remaining in 1847 was added to these terms, and afterwards every two years in odd-numbered years one judge was elected to an eight-year term.

1847 judicial election results
Office	Democratic ticket		Whig ticket		Anti-Rent ticket
Judge of the Court of Appeals	Addison Gardiner	145,282	Ambrose L. Jordan	127,519	Addison Gardiner
	Greene C. Bronson	144,784	Frederick Whittlesey	126,844	Greene C. Bronson
	Charles H. Ruggles	140,202	B. Davis Noxon	124,398	Ambrose L. Jordan
	Freeborn G. Jewett	138,313	Marcus T. Reynolds	123,933	Frederick Whittlesey
Clerk of the Court of Appeals	Charles S. Benton	136,312	J. T. Lamport	131,031	J. T. Lamport

== Sources ==
- Judges of the Court of Appeals at Court History New York
- Results: The Whig Almanac and United States Register 1848
