= George D. Ruggles =

United States Army general

George David Ruggles
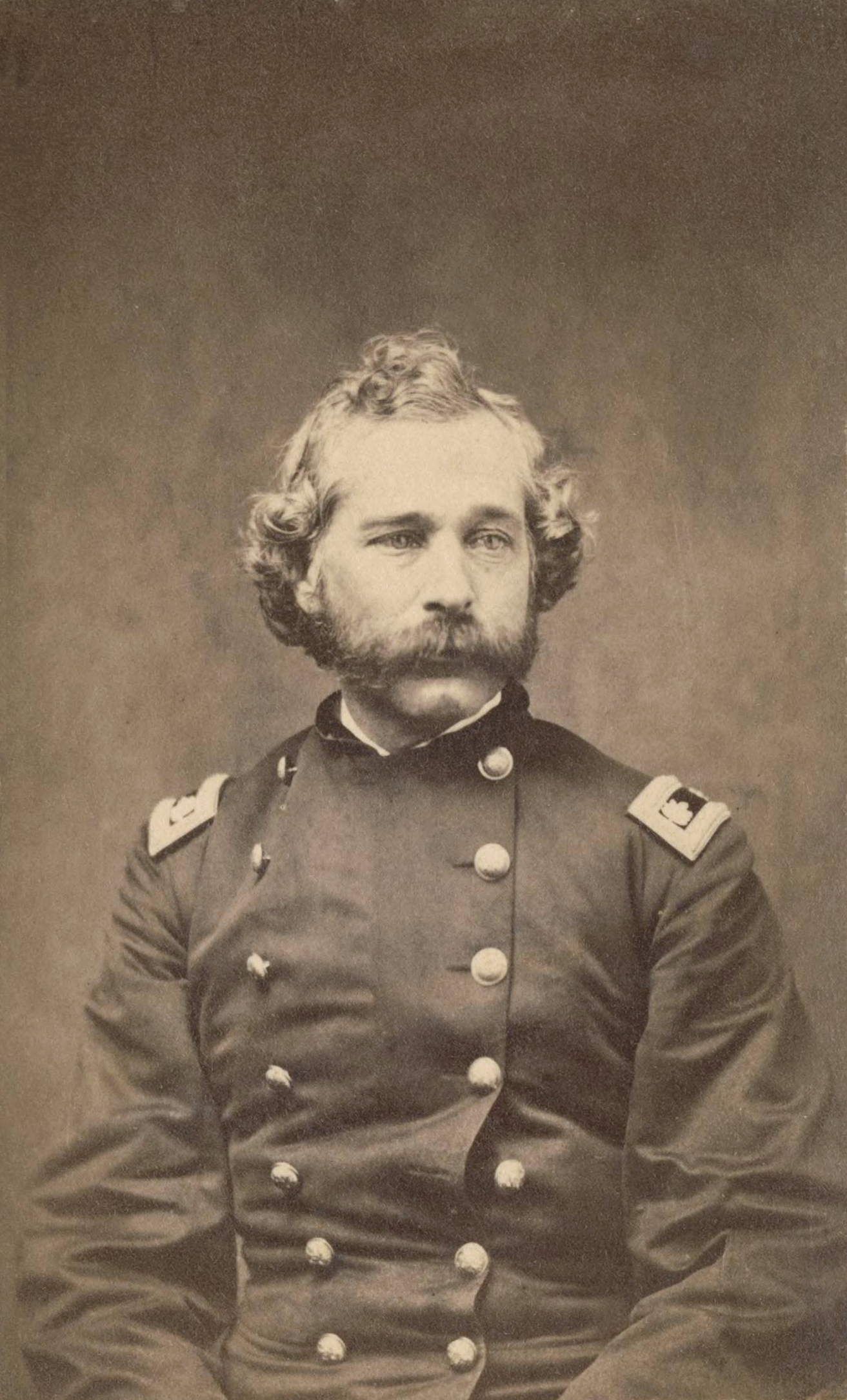
- George D. Ruggles
- Born: September 11, 1833; Newburgh, New York, US
- Died: October 19, 1904 (aged 71); Washington, D.C., US
- Burial place: Arlington National Cemetery
- Relatives: Charles H. Ruggles (uncle)
- Military career
- Allegiance: United States; Union
- Branch: US Army; Union Army
- Service years: 1855–1897
- Rank: Brigadier General
- Commands: Adjutant General of the U.S. Army
- Conflicts: American Civil War; Battle of Cedar Mountain; Second Battle of Bull Run; Battle of Chantilly; Battle of South Mountain; Battle of Antietam; Battle of Hatcher's Run; American Indian Wars

George David Ruggles (September 11, 1833 – October 19, 1904) was an American military officer who was Adjutant General of the United States Army from 1893 to 1897.

== Biography ==
He was born in Newburgh, New York. His parents died when he was young, and he was raised by his uncle, Charles H. Ruggles, who was Chief Justice of the New York Court of Appeals. He graduated from the United States Military Academy in 1855 and was appointed to the 2nd Infantry, in which he served until the outbreak of the American Civil War.

At the beginning of the war, he served in various staff positions, before becoming a colonel and chief-of-staff of the Army of Virginia under General John Pope, where he saw action in the Battle of Cedar Mountain, the Second Battle of Bull Run, and the Battle of Chantilly. He later served as assistant chief-of-staff of the Army of the Potomac, being engaged in the battles of South Mountain and Antietam. In December 1862, he was assigned to staff duty in Washington, D.C. In February 1865, he was named adjutant general of the Army of the Potomac under General George Meade, and took part in the Battle of Hatcher's Run.

Ruggles remained in the Adjutant General's Department following the end of the war, and from July 1865 through May 1888, served as adjutant general for various departments, including the Department of the Platte and the Department of Dakota. From January 1889 through July 1891 he served as adjutant general at the division level in the Division of the Pacific and the Division of the Atlantic.

In December 1892 he returned to the Adjutant General's Department in Washington, and he was elevated to Adjutant General of the U. S. Army with the rank of brigadier general in November 1893. He retired in September 1897. In April 1898, he was appointed governor of the Soldiers' Home in Washington, D.C., where he served until January 1903.

He died in 1904, and was buried at Arlington National Cemetery.

== Family ==
In 1868, Ruggles married Alma Hammond L'Hommedieu. They were the parents of four children, including Colden, Charles, Alma, and Francis.

== Sources ==
- Association of Graduates (1905). Thirty-Sixth Annual Reunion of the Association of Graduates of the United States Military Academy. Saginaw, Michigan: Seemann & Peters. pp. 92–98 – via Google Books.

Military offices
Preceded by Robert Williams	Adjutant General of the U. S. Army; November 6, 1893-September 11, 1897	Succeeded by Samuel Breck
