= Alexander S. Johnson =

American judge (1817–1878)

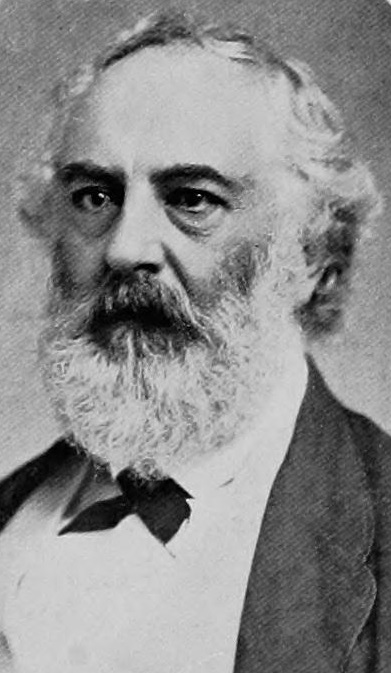
- From Volume I of 1912's History of Oneida County, New York from 1700 to the Present Time

Judge of the United States Circuit Courts for the Second Circuit
- In office October 25, 1875 – January 26, 1878
- Appointed by: Ulysses S. Grant
- Preceded by: Lewis Bartholomew Woodruff
- Succeeded by: Samuel Blatchford

Chief Judge of the New York Court of Appeals
- In office January 1, 1858 – December 31, 1859
- Preceded by: Hiram Denio
- Succeeded by: George F. Comstock

Personal details
- Born: Alexander Smith Johnson; July 30, 1817 Utica, U.S.
- Died: January 26, 1878 (aged 60) Nassau, The Bahamas
- Resting place: Forest Hill Cemetery; Utica, New York, U.S.
- Party: Democratic; Republican
- Education: Yale University read law

Alexander Smith Johnson (July 30, 1817 – January 26, 1878) was a judge and chief judge of the New York Court of Appeals and was a United States circuit judge of the United States Circuit Courts for the Second Circuit.

Johnson received a recess appointment from Ulysses Grant on October 25, 1875, to a seat vacated by Lewis Bartholomew Woodruff. Nominated on December 15, 1875; He was confirmed by the United States Senate on December 15, 1875, and received commission the same day. Johnson's service was terminated on January 26, 1878, due to death.

== Education and career ==
Born on July 30, 1817, in Utica, New York, Johnson graduated from Yale University in 1835 and read law in 1838. Johnson entered private practice in Utica from 1838 to 1839, in partnership with Samuel Beardsley. He continued private practice in New York City, New York, from 1839 to 1851, in partnership with Elish P. Hurlbut. He was a judge of the New York Court of Appeals from 1851 to 1859, elected on the Democratic ticket, and was chief judge from 1858 to 1859. In November 1859, he was defeated for re-election by Republican Henry E. Davies. He resumed private practice in Utica from 1859 to 1865. He was a treaty commissioner under the Oregon Treaty for settling the claims of the Hudson's Bay and Puget Sound Agricultural Companies, from 1865 to 1869, Great Britain being represented by Sir John Rose, 1st Baronet. Warm praise was awarded Johnson in both England and Canada for the sagacity that he displayed in the peaceful settlement of these difficulties, which at one time threatened serious results. He returned to private practice in Utica from 1869 to 1873. He was a member of the New York State Commission on Appeals from 1873 to 1874. In December 1873, he was appointed to the New York Court of Appeals by Governor John Adams Dix to fill the vacancy caused by the death of Rufus Wheeler Peckham. In November 1874, he ran for a full term on the Republican ticket, but was defeated, and left the bench on December 31, 1874.

== Federal judicial service ==
Johnson received a recess appointment from President Ulysses S. Grant on October 25, 1875, to a seat on the United States Circuit Courts for the Second Circuit vacated by Judge Lewis Bartholomew Woodruff. He was nominated to the same position by President Grant on December 15, 1875. He was confirmed by the United States Senate on December 15, 1875, and received his commission the same day. His service terminated on January 26, 1878, due to his death in Nassau, The Bahamas. He was interred at the Forest Hill Cemetery in Utica.

== Family ==
Johnson was the son of Alexander Bryan Johnson and Abigail Louisa Smith (Adams) Johnson (1798–1836); she was a daughter of Charles Adams and Sally Smith, a niece of William Stephens Smith, and a granddaughter of President John Adams and Abigail Adams. In 1852, Johnson married Catherine M. Crysler (1833–1898), and they had four children.

== Honor ==
In 1859, Hamilton College conferred the title of LL.D. on Johnson.

== Sources ==
- "Judge Johnson Sketch of the Republican Candidate for the Court of Appeals" (PDF). New York Times. September 26, 1874.
- "Judge Woodruff's successor" (PDF). New York Times. October 21, 1875.
- "Judge Johnson's death" (PDF). New York Times. February 3, 1878.
- "Obituary of Mrs. Catherine M. Johnson" (PDF). New York Times. February 6, 1898.
- The New York civil list: containing the names and origin of the civil divisions, and the names and dates of election or appointment of the principal state and county officers from the Revolution to the present time. Weed, Parsons and Co. 1858. p. 348 – via Internet Archive.

Legal offices
| Preceded by Hiram Denio | Chief Judge of the New York Court of Appeals; 1858–1859 | Succeeded by George F. Comstock |
| Preceded by Lewis Bartholomew Woodruff | Judge of the United States Circuit Courts for the Second Circuit; 1875–1878 | Succeeded by Samuel Blatchford |
