= Emma Mendenhall =

American painter

- Born: March 15, 1873; Cincinnati, Ohio
- Died: March 25, 1964 (aged 91)
- Education: Art Academy of Cincinnati
- Known for: Painting
- Movement: Impressionism

Emma Mendenhall (March 15, 1873 – March 25, 1964) was an American landscape, portrait and still life painter. A lifelong resident of Cincinnati, where she taught at the Oakhurst School, Mendenhall also traveled widely, incorporating scenes of Europe and North America into her work.

== Early life and education ==
Emma Mendenhall was born in Cincinnati, Ohio, the eldest daughter of Charles and Fannie Mendenhall. She was the niece of Cincinnati art patron and philanthropist Mrs. Larz Anderson, a connection which helped her become a part of local society.

Mendenhall attended classes at the Art Academy of Cincinnati from 1890 to 1914, where she studied with Vincent Nowottny and Frank Duveneck. She also studied at the Julian Academy in Paris with Jules Lefebvre, with William Merritt Chase at the Shinnecock Hills Summer School of Art, and Charles Woodbury at his Ogunquit, Maine summer school.

== Career ==
Mendenhall taught at the Oakhurst School in Cincinnati, but she also traveled extensively with her friend and fellow artist Dixie Selden. The pair traveled to France, Mexico, Denmark, Spain, Portugal, China, Japan, Morocco, England and the Holy Land. Mendenhall often spent summers along the New England coast, where she painted with Annie Gooding Sykes.

Known for her impressionistic watercolors, Mendenhall also worked with oil and pastel. She produced portraits, landscapes, travel scenes, flowers and still lifes. Her art was shown at the Art Institute of Chicago, Pennsylvania Academy of the Fine Arts, and the Cincinnati Art Museum, including a 1910 exhibition of her works with those of Dixie Selden and Annie G. Sykes.

Mendenhall was a member of the American Watercolor Society from 1921 to 1964. She was also a member of the National Arts Club, the Washington Water Color Club, the Women's Art Club of Cincinnati, the Professional Artists of Cincinnati, the 3 Arts Club, and the MacDowell Club.

== Collections ==
- Cincinnati Art Museum: Street Scene, Brittany
- Indianapolis Museum of Art: A Warm Day in the Market San Miguel d'Allende
