= Hiram Denio =

American judge (1799–1871)

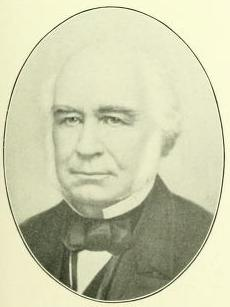

Chief Judge of the New York Court of Appeals
- In office January 1, 1856 – December 31, 1857
- Preceded by: Addison Gardiner
- Succeeded by: Alexander S. Johnson
- In office July 1, 1862 – December 31, 1865
- Preceded by: Samuel L. Selden
- Succeeded by: Henry E. Davies

Personal details
- Born: May 21, 1799 Rome, New York, U.S.
- Died: November 5, 1871 (aged 72) Utica, New York, U.S.
- Resting place: Forest Hill Cemetery; Utica, New York, U.S.
- Party: Democratic

Hiram Denio (May 21, 1799 – November 5, 1871) was an American lawyer and politician from New York. He was Chief Judge of the New York Court of Appeals from 1856 to 1857; and from 1862 to 1865.

== Life ==
He was born on May 21, 1799, in Rome, Oneida County, New York.

He was District Attorney of Oneida County from 1825 to 1834; Judge of the Fifth Circuit Court from 1834 to 1838; and a New York State Bank Commissioner from 1838 to 1840.

He was a clerk of the New York Supreme Court from 1845 to 1847, and published 31 volumes of law reports:

- Reports in Supreme Court and Court of Errors (from May 1845 to May 1847; 5 vol.)
- Cases in the Court of Errors (from 1840 to 1846, appeals; 12 vol.)
- Cases in the Court of Errors (from 1830 to 1846, writs of error; 14 vol.)

On June 23, 1853, he was appointed by Governor Horatio Seymour as a judge of the New York Court of Appeals, to fill the vacancy caused by the resignation of Freeborn G. Jewett. At the New York state election, 1853, he was elected to fill the unexpired term of Jewett until 1857. At the New York state election, 1857, he was re-elected to a full eight-year term, and remained on the bench until the end of 1865. He was Chief Judge of the New York Court of Appeals from 1856 to 1857; and, after the resignation of Samuel L. Selden, from July 1862 until the end of his term.

He died on November 5, 1871, in Utica, New York; and was buried at the Forest Hill Cemetery there.

== Sources ==
- Albany Law Journal (Weed, Parsons & Co., 1871)
- The New York Civil List compiled by Franklin Benjamin Hough (pages 39, 346, 348, 356 and 377; Weed, Parsons and Co., 1858)

Legal offices
Preceded by Addison Gardiner	Chief Judge of the New York Court of Appeals; 1856–1857	Succeeded by Alexander S. Johnson
Preceded by Samuel L. Selden	Chief Judge of the New York Court of Appeals; 1862–1865	Succeeded by Henry E. Davies
