= Charles H. Ruggles =

American judge

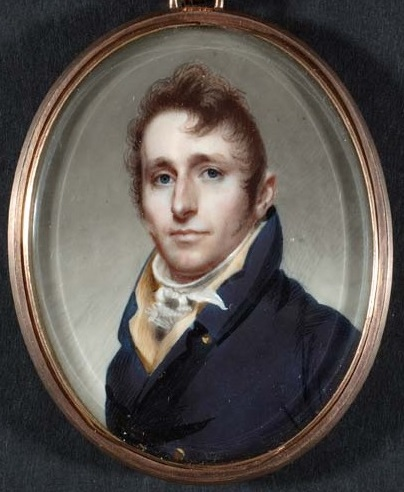
- Portrait of Ruggles, ca. 1810

Chief Judge of the New York Court of Appeals
- In office 1851–1853
- Preceded by: Greene C. Bronson
- Succeeded by: Addison Gardiner

Judge of the Second Circuit Court
- In office 1831–1846
- Preceded by: James Emott
- Succeeded by: Seward Barculo

Member of the U.S. House of Representatives from New York's 7th district
- In office March 4, 1821 – March 3, 1823
- Preceded by: Jacob H. De Witt
- Succeeded by: Lemuel Jenkins

Personal details
- Born: Charles Herman Ruggles; February 10, 1789 New Milford, Connecticut, U.S.
- Died: June 16, 1865 (aged 76) Poughkeepsie, New York, U.S.
- Relations: Samuel Ruggles (cousin); George D. Ruggles (nephew)

Charles Herman Ruggles (February 10, 1789 – June 16, 1865) was an American lawyer and politician who was a U.S. representative from New York and chief judge of the New York Court of Appeals.

== Early life ==
Ruggles was born on February 10, 1789, in New Milford, Litchfield County, Connecticut. He was the son of Joseph Ruggles (1757–1834) and Mercy (née Warner) Ruggles (1761–1798). His brother David Ruggles was married to Sarah Colden, a great-granddaughter of Cadwallader Colden, the colonial governor of New York.

He graduated from Litchfield Law School in 1803, was admitted to the bar and began practice in Kingston, New York.

== Career ==
He was a member from Sullivan and Ulster Counties of the New York State Assembly in 1820.

Ruggles was elected as a Federalist to the 17th United States Congress, and served from December 3, 1821, to March 3, 1823.

He was Judge of the Second Circuit Court of New York from 1831 to 1846, and was a delegate to the New York State Constitutional Convention of 1846.

On June 7, 1847, he was elected one of the first judges of the New York Court of Appeals. On June 22, he drew a term of six years and a half, and took office on July 5. He became Chief Judge after the resignation of Greene C. Bronson in April 1851 and remained on this post until the end of 1853. In November 1853, Ruggles was re-elected to an eight-year term as an associate judge. In June 1855, he fell ill and was absent from the Court's June and September terms. On August 20, 1855, he announced his resignation to take effect on October 20, 1855. George F. Comstock was elected in November 1855 to fill the vacancy.

== Personal life ==
After the early death of his brother David in 1837, Charles raised his nephew and David's son, George David Ruggles (1833–1904), an officer in the United States Army who served as Adjutant General of the U.S. Army from 1893 to 1897.

Ruggles died in Poughkeepsie, New York, Dutchess County, New York, on June 16, 1865, and interred at Christ Church (Episcopal) Cemetery. In 1888, all remains at this burying ground were removed to Poughkeepsie Rural Cemetery.

== See also ==
- George D. Ruggles

== Sources ==
- United States Congress. "Charles H. Ruggles (id: R000501)". Biographical Directory of the United States Congress.
- The New York Civil List compiled by Franklin Benjamin Hough (pages 301, 348 and 355; Weed, Parsons and Co., 1858)
- Portrait of Charles H. Ruggles, Historical Society of the Courts of New York State

U.S. House of Representatives
Preceded by Jacob H. De Witt	Member of the U.S. House of Representatives from New York's 7th congressional district 1821–1823	Succeeded by Lemuel Jenkins
Legal offices
Preceded by James Emott	Judge of the Second Circuit Court; 1831–1846	Succeeded by Seward Barculo
Preceded by Greene C. Bronson	Chief Judge of the New York Court of Appeals; 1851–1853	Succeeded by Addison Gardiner
