= Alexander Eakin Shiras =

US Army brigadier general (1812–1875)

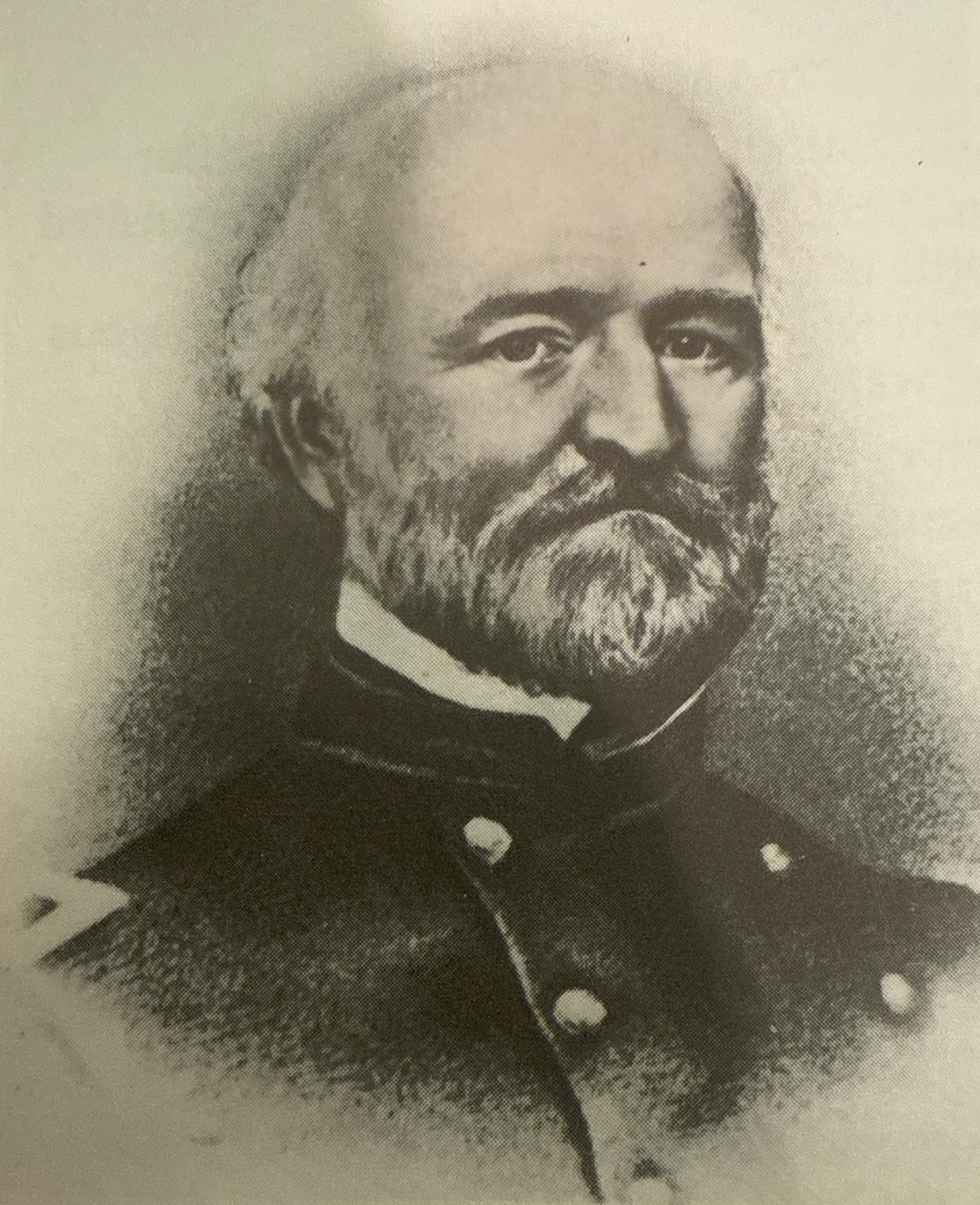
- Shiras c. 1870
- Born: 10 August 1812; Philadelphia, Pennsylvania, US
- Died: 14 April 1875 (aged 62); Washington, D.C., US
- Burial place: Saint Andrew's Graveyard, Mount Holly, New Jersey, US
- Education: United States Military Academy
- Military career
- Allegiance: United States; Union (American Civil War)
- Service: United States Army; Union Army
- Service years: 1833–1861, 1866–1875 (US Army); 1861–1866 (Union Army)
- Rank: Brigadier General (US Army); Brevet Major General
- Units: US Army Field Artillery Branch; US Army Subsistence Department
- Commands: US Army Commissary General of Subsistence
- Wars: Second Seminole War; Mexican–American War; American Civil War

Alexander E. Shiras (10 August 1812 – 14 April 1875) was a career officer in the United States Army. A veteran of the American Indian Wars, Mexican–American War, and American Civil War, in 1874 he attained the rank of brigadier general when he was appointed as the army's commissary general. While serving in the Union Army from 1861 to 1866, he attained the ranks of brigadier general and major general by brevet as commendations for his distinguished Civil War service.

Shiras was a native of Philadelphia, and was raised and educated in Mount Holly, New Jersey. In 1829, he was appointed to the United States Military Academy at West Point. Upon graduating in 1833, he began his career as a Field Artillery officer. Shiras served in Florida during the Second Seminole War and as a professor of mathematics at West Point. During the Mexican–American War, he performed commissary of subsistence duties in New York City and Washington, D.C. After the war, he continued to perform commissary duties. During the American Civil War he served as assistant commissary general and a member of the United States Sanitary Commission.

After the Civil War, Shiras continued to serve as assistant commissary general. In June 1874, he was appointed as commissary general and promoted to brigadier general. He became ill in 1875, and died in Washington on 14 April. He was buried at Saint Andrew's Graveyard in Mount Holly.

== Early life ==
Alexander Eakin Shiras was born in Philadelphia on 10 August 1812, a son of George B. Shiras and Joanna Eakin (Greenman) Shiras. He was raised and educated in Mount Holly, New Jersey, and in 1829 his uncle Constant M. Eakin, an 1817 graduate of the United States Military Academy at West Point, successfully advocated for Shiras to receive appointment as a cadet. He graduated from West Point in 1833 ranked 20th of 43. Shiras's classmates who attained prominence in the careers included John G. Barnard, George Washington Cullum, Rufus King, Francis Henney Smith, David Bullock Harris, William Wallace Smith Bliss, John Addison Thomas, Henry du Pont, Benjamin Alvord, Henry W. Wessells, Abraham Myers, Daniel Ruggles, and Henry Lee Scott.

At graduation in July 1833, Shiras was appointed a second lieutenant of Field Artillery by brevet and assigned to the Field Artillery School at Fort Monroe, Virginia. During 1833 and 1834, he took part in the forced removal of the Muscogee Nation from Georgia and Alabama to the Indian Territory during the Trail of Tears. He then joined the garrison at Fort Monroe, where in October 1835 he received his commission as a second lieutenant in the 4th Regiment of Artillery.

== Continued career ==
Shiras served at Fort Washington, Maryland in 1835 and at Fort Columbus, New York from 1835 to 1837. From 1837 to 1838, he performed commissary of subsistence duties at Governors Island, New York. Shiras received promotion to first lieutenant in May 1837. In 1838, he was a participant in the Trail of Tears forced removal of the Cherokee Nation from their ancestral homeland in the Southeastern United States to Indian Territory. In 1838 and 1839, Shiras took part in the Second Seminole War in Florida. He served in the Fort Columbus garrison again in 1839.

In August 1839, Shiras was assigned to the West Point faculty as assistant professor of mathematics. In January 1840, he was appointed principal assistant professor of mathematics, and he remained at West Point until August 1843. He served again at Fort Monroe from 1843 to 1844 and performed temporary recruiting duty from 1844 to 1845. From 1845 to 1846, he was again assigned to the garrison at Fort Monroe. During the Mexican–American War of 1846 to 1848, Shiras was first assigned to commissary duties in New York City, and later as assistant to the commissary general of subsistence in Washington, D.C. He was promoted to captain in the field artillery on 3 March 1847, and on the same day was commissioned as a captain in the commissary department.

== Later career ==
After the Mexican war, Shiras continued to serve in Washington as assistant to the commissary general; he remained in this position until April 1861, except for temporary commissary duty in St. Louis in 1857. In 1851, he received the honorary degree of Master of Arts from the College of William & Mary. During the American Civil War, Shiras served in the Union Army from 1861 to 1866; he was assistant to the commissary general from April 1861 to February 1863, then received appointment as assistant commissary general. He was promoted to major in May 1861 and colonel in February 1863. Shiras also served as a member of the United States Sanitary Commission from 1861 to 1866; the commission was responsible for the health and hygiene of military members during the war, including establishing and furnishing hospitals, recruiting doctors and nurses, and operating rest houses for traveling and disabled service members. He received brevet promotions to brigadier general in September 1864 and major general in March 1865 as commendations of the meritorious service he rendered throughout the war.

Following the Civil War, Shiras continued to serve as assistant commissary general of subsistence with the rank of colonel. In June 1874, he was promoted to brigadier general and assigned as the army's commissary general. He continued to serve until his death. Shiras died in Washington on 14 April 1875. He was buried at Saint Andrew's Graveyard in Mount Holly, New Jersey. Shiras never married, and he had no children. News accounts after his death indicated that Shiras's estate was valued at over $500,000, (Note: over $14.6 million in 2025) which was disseminated to his heirs at law.

== Dates of rank ==
Shiras's dates of rank were:

- Second Lieutenant (Brevet), 1 July 1833
- Second Lieutenant, 6 October 1835
- First Lieutenant, 31 May 1837
- Captain, 3 March 1847
- Major, 11 May 1861
- Colonel, 9 February 1863
- Brigadier General, 23 June 1874

=== Honors ===
Shiras received brevet promotions to brigadier general (17 September 1864) and major general (13 March 1865) in recognition of the commendable service he rendered during the Civil War. In addition, Mount Holly's Grand Army of the Republic Post 26 was named in Shiras's honor.
