= Lewis Bartholomew Woodruff =

American judge (1809–1875)

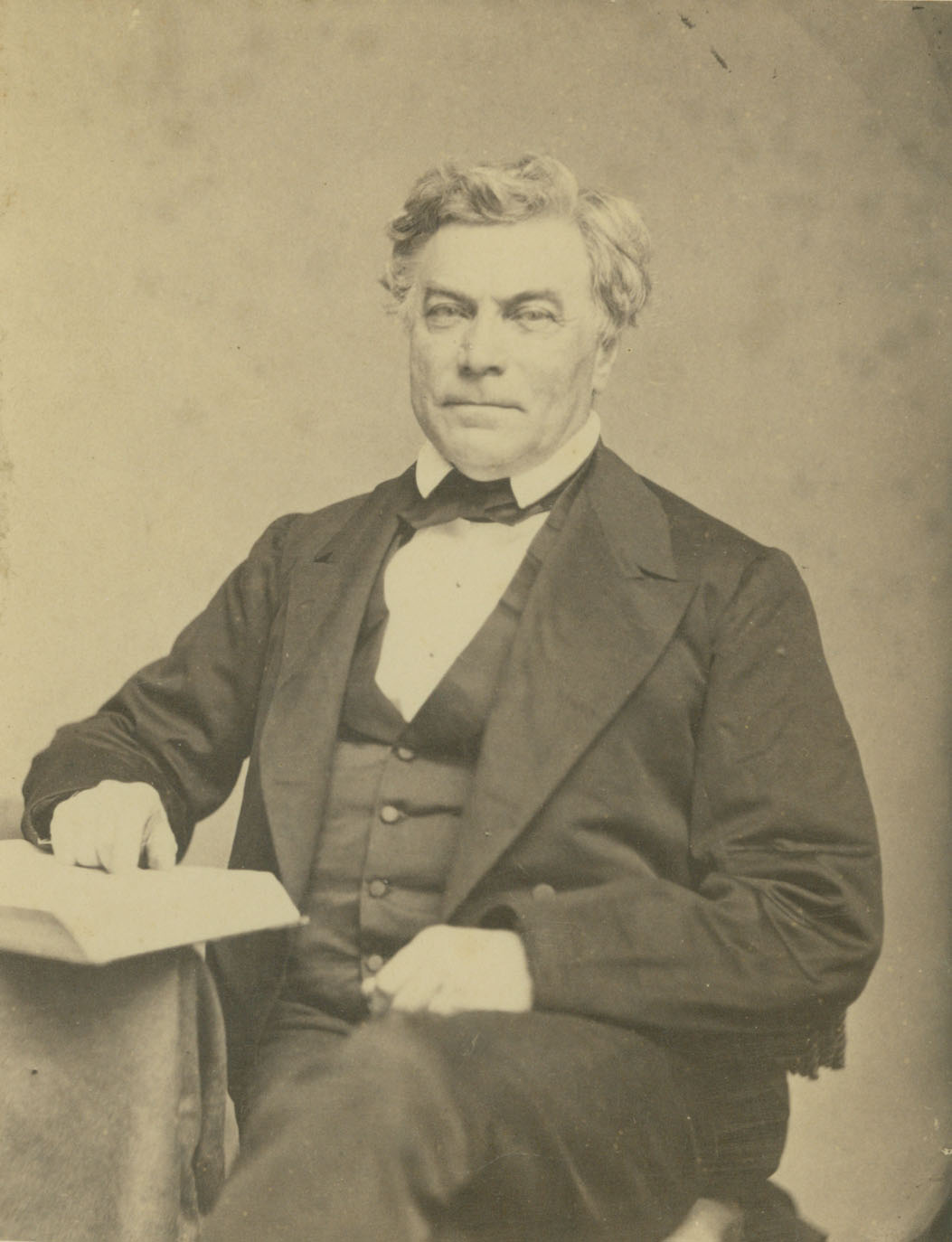

Judge of the United States Circuit Courts for the Second Circuit
- In office December 22, 1869 – September 10, 1875
- Appointed by: Ulysses S. Grant
- Preceded by: Seat established by 16 Stat. 44
- Succeeded by: Alexander S. Johnson

Personal details
- Born: Lewis Bartholomew Woodruff; June 19, 1809 Litchfield, Connecticut
- Died: September 10, 1875 (aged 66) Litchfield, Connecticut
- Education: Yale University (B.A.); Litchfield Law School

Lewis Bartholomew Woodruff (June 19, 1809 – September 10, 1875) was a United States circuit judge of the United States Circuit Courts for the Second Circuit.

== Education and career ==
Born on June 19, 1809, in Litchfield, Connecticut, Woodruff received a Bachelor of Arts degree in 1830 from Yale University and graduated from Litchfield Law School in 1832. He entered private practice in New York City, New York from 1832 to 1849. He was a Judge of the Court of Common Pleas of New York City from 1849 to 1855. He was a justice of the New York City Superior Court from 1856 to 1861. He resumed private practice in New York City from 1861 to 1868. He was a Judge of the New York Court of Appeals from 1868 to 1869.

== Federal judicial service ==
Woodruff was nominated by President Ulysses S. Grant on December 8, 1869, to the United States Circuit Courts for the Second Circuit, to a new seat authorized by 16 Stat. 44. He was confirmed by the United States Senate on December 22, 1869, and received his commission the same day. His service terminated on September 10, 1875, due to his death at his summer residence in Litchfield, from the effects of a complicated disorder of the kidneys which had confined him to the house since the early spring.

== Honor ==
Woodruff received the honorary degree of Doctor of Laws from Columbia University in 1860.

== Family and church ==
For some years before his death, Woodruff was an elder of the Collegiate Reformed Church. Woodruff married Harriette B. in November 1835, she being the daughter of New Jersey Supreme Court Chief Justice Joseph Coerten Hornblower of Newark, New Jersey. She died April 5, 1868. They had three children.

== Sources ==
Legal offices
Preceded by Seat established by 16 Stat. 44	Judge of the United States Circuit Courts for the Second Circuit; 1869–1875	Succeeded by Alexander S. Johnson
