= Jacob H. De Witt =

American politician (1784–1857)

Jacob Hasbrouck De Witt
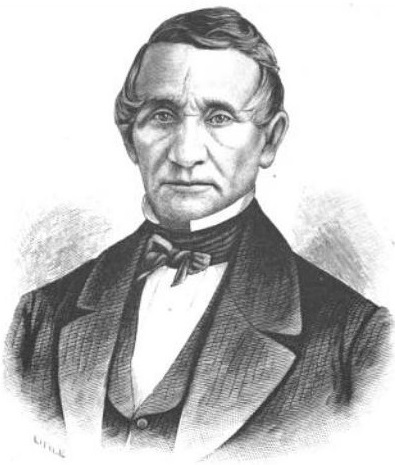

New York State Assembly
- In office 1847
- In office 1839

Member of the U.S. House of Representatives from New York's 7th district
- In office March 4, 1819 – March 3, 1821
- Preceded by: Josiah Hasbrouck
- Succeeded by: Charles H. Ruggles

Personal details
- Born: October 2, 1784 Marbletown, New York, US
- Died: January 30, 1857 (aged 72) Kingston, New York, US
- Party: Democratic-Republican
- Spouse: Sarah Ann Sleight
- Children: 4

Military service
- Allegiance: New York
- Branch/service: New York militia
- Rank: Colonel
- Unit: 131st Regiment
- Battles/wars: War of 1812

Jacob Hasbrouck De Witt (October 2, 1784 – January 30, 1857) was a U.S. Representative from New York.

== Early life ==
Born in Marbletown, New York, De Witt was raised in Twaalskill (now part of the city of Kingston). His father was Colonel Thomas De Witt (1741-1809), a veteran of the American Revolution. His mother, Elsie Hasbrouck DeWitt (1749-1832), was the daughter of Jacob and Maria (Hornbeck) Hasbrouck, making her a member of the Hasbrouck family and a relative of many early notable Ulster County politicians. His parents had married February 28, 1782.

His aunt Mary De Witt was the first wife of General James Clinton, and was the mother of DeWitt Clinton, making him Jacob's first cousin. Jacob De Witt attended the rural schools of Twaalskill and the Kingston (New York) Academy, afterwards becoming a farmer. His grandfather, Egbert A. DeWitt, was town supervisor of Rochester, Ulster County, New York from 1736 to 1738.

He served as the adjutant of a militia regiment in the War of 1812. He continued his militia service, and later attained the rank of Colonel as commander of the New York Militia's 131st Regiment.

== Political career and death ==
De Witt was elected as a Democratic-Republican to the Sixteenth Congress (March 4, 1819 – March 3, 1821). He was not a candidate for renomination in 1820, and returned to farming.

In 1827 and 1840 De Witt was Kingston's Town Supervisor and a member of the Ulster County Board of Supervisors. He was a member of the New York State Assembly in 1839 and 1847.

De Witt died in Kingston on January 30, 1857. He was originally buried at Sharpe Cemetery on Albany Avenue, and later reinterred at Kinsgton's Old Dutch Churchyard.

== Personal life ==
Jacob married Mary Ann Meyer (1797-1816) on February 20, 1815. She died just a year later.

On June 8, 1823 he married Sarah Ann Sleight, daughter of Johannes and Aaltje (Swartwout) Sleight and a granddaughter of Jacobus Swartwout. They had at least four children:

- Elsie De Witt (1823-1900); died unmarried.
- Mary De Witt (1825-1893); married Kingston banker James Sidney Evans (1816-1857) in 1850
  - Thomas Grier Evans (1852-1905); wrote the genealogical book "de Witt Family of Ulster County, New York" in 1886; was a Yale graduate and lawyer
- Anna De Witt (1834-1901); married Charles Lytle Lamberton (1829-1906), who was a Pennsylvania State Senator from 1862 to 1864
- John Sleight De Witt (1838-1901)

DeWitt Street in Kingston, New York was named for Jacob and his unmarried brother, Reuben DeWitt (1787-1859).

U.S. House of Representatives
Preceded by Josiah Hasbrouck	Member of the U.S. House of Representatives from New York's 7th congressional district 1819–1821	Succeeded by Charles H. Ruggles
