= Elizabeth Selden Rogers =

American suffragist (1868 - 1950)

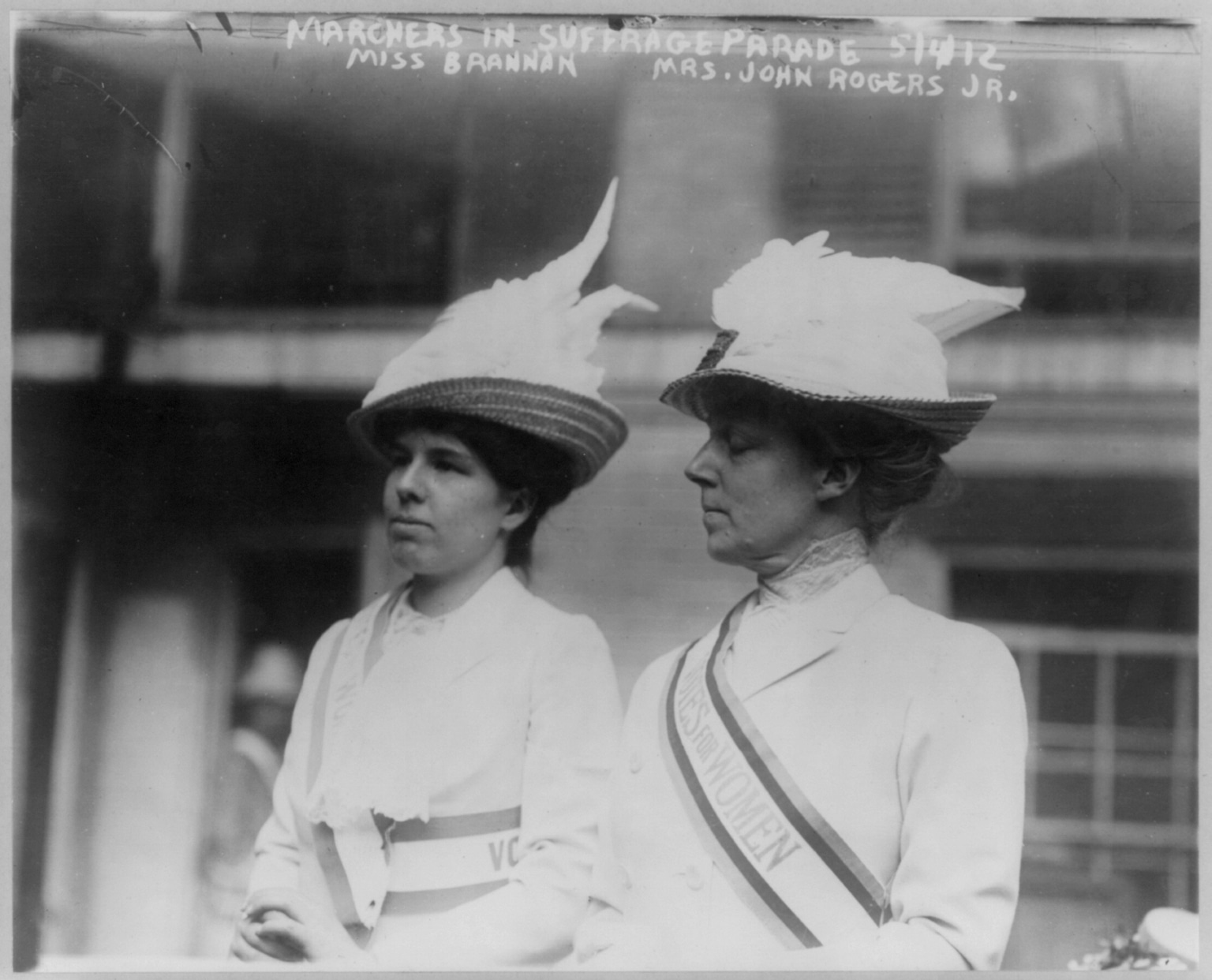
- Elizabeth Selden Rogers, right, marches in a suffragette parade with Miss Brannan, left, ca. 1912.
- Born: Elizabeth Selden White; July 23, 1868; Astoria, Queens, New York, US
- Died: December 18, 1950 (aged 82); New York City, US
- Spouse: John Rogers (1866-1939) (m. 1895)
- Children: 3
- Relatives: Amos Beebe Eaton grandfather Roger Sherman, 2nd great grandfather

Elizabeth Selden White Rogers (July 23, 1868 – December 18, 1950) was a civic reformer who worked to improve the New York public schools, and to win suffrage for women in the state of New York and the nation.

== Suffrage writing ==
One of Rogers' major roles in the suffrage movement was to write articles in various newspapers calling for woman suffrage. In one issue of the San Francisco Call and Post in 1911, Rogers stated that "An attack on woman suffrage is an attack on democracy."

In May 1912, Rogers helped lead a parade to fight for woman suffrage in the state of New York. "The wonderful procession clearly showed that women will win the vote in New York, and very soon, too" she wrote in the New-York Tribune. "The majority of the women of New York were not marching, but that fifteen thousand women of all kinds were sufficiently interested in Votes for Women to march for this principle of justice is proof that the movement is of such a force that it is bound to win." She expressed her admiration for the strength and dedication of the women involved, as she wrote:

As I marched on Saturday and felt that behind me was line after line and thousands upon thousands of women, all joined by their love of liberty and belief in equality of human rights and opportunities, it seemed to me that never was the outlook brighter for the welfare of humanity. For it simply mean that the best, most intelligent and sweetest of New York women were bravely showing their eagerness to help make the world a better place to live in, so that all little children may have a better chance of growing up good and happy and strong.

Rogers worked with Alice Paul, founder of the National Woman's Party, to establish suffrage groups under the name Women's Political Union. In 1915, Rogers toured with Oxford-educated suffrage speaker Eleanor Brannan. In Putnam, they met with Edith Diehl, Marjorie Addis, Antoinette Hopkins, Helena Fish, Kate deForest Crane, and many more.

The following is an excerpt from Elizabeth Selden Rogers's editorial, "Why We Withdrew," published in Women's Political World in 1915:

A great deal is said of the value of co-operation of all societies and the economy of not duplicating work. While believing heartily in a certain amount and kind of co-operation, we are not blind to the fact that too complete unity may result. in stagnation ... The [Women's Political) Union believes that the existence of many suffrage societies is an evidence of the vitality of the movement, and that the friendly rivalry of such societies results in more and better work being done, that it gives the freedom necessary to growth, affording scope for individuality, and allowing personality to count. ... To those of our members who are worrying over this co-operate (sic) idea, we would point out that if in the past four or five years the Women's Political Union in New York City had been bound by a two-thirds vote of a campaign committee, like the one now formed, we would never have had a parade, or an outdoor meeting, or a campaign against certain enemies in the Legislature.

== Suffrage Protests and Arrest ==
Rogers helped the Congressional Committee, which later became the National Woman's Party, organize a parade in Washington the day before President Woodrow Wilson's inauguration, with the hope of making a statement to Wilson and instigating negotiation with the President and Congress. Alice Paul, the leader of the Committee, sought Rogers' support. The two appealed to Rogers' brother-in-law, Secretary of War Henry L. Stimson, to ask that he assign military personnel to help keep order. Stimson could take little action due to his position, but he was sympathetic to the movement and ordered the Fifteenth Cavalry from Fort Myer, Maryland, to bivouac on the western perimeter of Washington to help protect the suffragists.

On July 14, 1917, the French holiday of Bastille Day, sixteen Silent Sentinels, including Rogers, picketed the White House, carrying a banner with the French motto "Liberty, Equality, Fraternity". All sixteen were arrested, tried, and sentenced to sixty days in the Occoquan Workhouse in Virginia for unlawful assemblage. In her defense, Rogers stated:

We are not guilty of any offense. We know full well that we stand here because the President of the United States refuses to give liberty to American women.... The President puts his power behind all measures in which he takes a genuine interest. If he will say one frank word advocating this measure it will pass as a piece of war emergency legislation.

Following the arrests, Rogers and fellow suffragist Eunice Dana Brannan sent a telegraph to The Sun newspaper, which read:

We were arrested to-day for carrying an appeal to the White House. The guilt lies with those who deny justice, not with those who demand justice. In all this question the country should blame the President for failing to secure the passage of the Federal Woman Suffrage amendment and should uphold women who are fighting for American ideals of government.

President Wilson was under pressure to pardon the suffragists, and did so after just a few days. Although President Woodrow Wilson had displayed public support for an amendment granting woman suffrage, many in Congress did not take it seriously. On December 16, 1918, with Wilson in France to attend the Peace Conference to end World War I, hundreds of women marched through Washington, carrying lighted torches and purple, white, and gold banners. A crowd watched as they set fire to all of Wilson's speeches and books concerning "liberty," freedom," and "democracy" in an urn. Rogers, chairman of the National Advisory Council of the National Woman's Party and its legislative chairman for New York, spoke to the crowd:

We hold this meeting to protest against the denial of liberty to American women. All over the world today we see surging and sweeping irresistibly on, the great tide of democracy, and women would be derelict in their duty if they did not see to it that it brings freedom to the women of this land.... Our ceremony today is planned to call attention to the fact that President Wilson has gone abroad to establish democracy in foreign lands when he has failed to establish democracy at home. We burn his words on liberty today, not in malice or anger, but in a spirit of reverence for truth. This meeting is a message to President Wilson. We expect an answer. If the answer is more words we will burn them again. The only answer the National Woman's Party will accept is the instant passage of the amendment in the Senate.

== Prison Special ==
In the spring of 1919, Rogers participated in the Suffrage "Prison Special" Tour, in which 26 women, all of whom had been arrested for picketing the White House in support of women's suffrage, organized a train tour to share their stories as political prisoners in the Occoquan Workhouse and D.C. jails. Their slogan was "From Prison to People" and they called their train the "Democracy Limited." The suffragists traveled to 15 major cities in the United States, including many in the more conservative South, believing that Southern support was the key to passing a suffrage Amendment. The women, including Rogers, wore replicas of their prison uniforms, gave speeches, and fundraised. A Suffragist article about the Prison Special described how their audiences in the West had “become a path of people freshly awakened to the deep importance of immediate national action.”

== Early life and education ==
Rogers was born on July 23, 1868, in Astoria, Queens, New York. Her sister was Mabel Wellington White, wife of US Secretary of War Henry L. Stimson. She was also the maternal granddaughter of Union Major General Amos Beebe Eaton and a descendant of Roger Sherman, one of the Founding Fathers of the United States and signers of the Declaration of Independence.

== Personal life ==
She married John Rogers (1866-1939) in 1895. He was later a Professor of Clinical Surgery at the Cornell Medical School. They had a daughter, Elizabeth Selden Rogers, who married Francis H. Horan, and had two sons.

Her grandfather General Eaton was the son of Amos Eaton and Sally Cady Eaton, and was the first cousin of Elizabeth Cady Stanton. She was also the great-niece of Henry R. Selden, who defended Susan B. Anthony when she was arrested for voting in the 1872 national election. Henry was the brother of her grandmother and namesake Elizabeth Selden Eaton.

The Rogers' lived in Putnam County, New York. They also owned a summer home in Towners, New York, known as "Freedom Farm." She died on December 18, 1950, in New York City.

== See also ==
- Women's suffrage
- Women's rights
