= Addison Gardiner =

American judge (1797–1883)

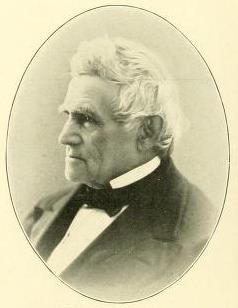
- From 1903's Notable Men of Central New York

Chief Judge of the New York Court of Appeals
- In office 1854–1855
- Preceded by: Charles H. Ruggles
- Succeeded by: Hiram Denio

Judge of the New York Court of Appeals
- In office 1847–1854
- Preceded by: None (position created)
- Succeeded by: Charles H. Ruggles

Lieutenant Governor of New York
- In office 1845–1847
- Governor: Silas Wright; John Young
- Preceded by: Daniel S. Dickinson
- Succeeded by: Albert Lester (acting)

Judge of the Eighth Circuit Court of New York
- In office 1829–1838
- Preceded by: John Birdsall
- Succeeded by: John B. Skinner

District Attorney of Monroe County, New York
- In office 1827–1829
- Preceded by: Daniel D. Barnard
- Succeeded by: Daniel D. Barnard

Personal details
- Born: March 19, 1797 Rindge, New Hampshire
- Died: June 5, 1883 (aged 86) Rochester, New York
- Resting place: Mount Hope Cemetery, Rochester, New York
- Party: Democratic
- Spouse: Mary Selkrigg (m. 1831-1869, her death)
- Children: 2
- Parent(s): William Gardner; Rebecca (Raymond) Gardner
- Education: Union College
- Profession: Attorney

Addison Gardiner (March 19, 1797 – June 5, 1883) was an American lawyer and politician who served as the lieutenant governor of New York from 1845 to 1847 and Chief Judge of the New York Court of Appeals from 1854 to 1855.

== Early life and career ==
Gardiner was born in Rindge, New Hampshire, on March 19, 1797, the son of William Gardner and Rebecca (Raymond) Gardner. The family eventually settled in Manlius, New York, where William Gardner became a successful businessman. Gardner's sons, including Addison, later decided to restore the original spelling of their family name, Gardiner. Addison Gardiner was educated at Manlius Academy, and received his degree from Union College in 1819. He was later admitted to the college's Philomathean Society as an honorary member. In 1851, Gardiner received the honorary degree of LL.D. from the University of Rochester.

After college, Gardiner studied law, was admitted to the bar in 1822, and began practicing in Rochester, New York, with Samuel L. Selden, who later became a judge of the New York Court of Appeals. Selden's brother Henry R. Selden later studied law with Gardiner and Selden, then served as lieutenant governor and judge of the Court of Appeals. Gardiner was the first Justice of the Peace ever elected in Rochester.

== D.A. and Circuit Judge ==
In 1827, Gardiner was appointed District Attorney of Monroe County. From 1829 to 1838, he was Judge of the Eighth Circuit Court of New York, with jurisdiction over the counties of Allegany, Erie, Chautauqua, Monroe, Genesee and Niagara. The Anti-Masonic excitement, growing out of the disappearance of William Morgan, had now commenced, and perhaps the most important case that came before Judge Gardiner, while on the bench of the circuit court, was that against Elihu Mather who was tried for conspiracy in the abduction of Morgan. After the acquittal of the defendant, a motion for a new trial was made in the New York State Supreme Court. The case is to be found in the fourth volume of Wendell's reports, page 220. The head notes, giving the disposition of the various questions raised, occupy four pages. On many of the points it has ever been a leading case. All the rulings of the judge were sustained by the Supreme Court, and these, and other decisions, gave him the reputation of the model circuit judge. He resigned his judicial office in February 1838, and returned to the practice of law at Rochester.

== Lieutenant Governor and Court of Appeals ==
In November 1844, he was elected Lieutenant Governor of New York on the Democratic ticket, with Silas Wright for Governor. Many important questions came before the New York State Senate while he presided. It was the period of the anti-rent disturbances, and various preventive and remedial measures were discussed. The enlargement of the canals, and other questions concerning internal improvements, received attention. One of the most important bills provided for the call of a state convention for the formation of a new constitution. As President of the Senate, Lieutenant Governor Gardiner was the presiding officer of the Court for the Correction of Errors, then the state's highest court of appeal, consisting of the president of the Senate, the senators, chancellor, and justices of the New York Supreme Court. Not many cases were carried to this tribunal, litigation usually ceasing with the decision of the Supreme Court or that of the chancellor, so that most of them were important in principle or amount. Those decided during his presidency can be found in Denio's reports. Gardiner was reelected Lieutenant Governor in 1846, defeating Hamilton Fish, the Whig candidate, by a majority of 13,000 votes, although the Whig's candidate for governor John Young was elected by a majority of more than 11,000 over the incumbent Governor Wright - then, the governor and the lieutenant governor, although running mates, were elected on separate ballots. Gardiner had been nominated on a cross-endorsed ticket with Young by the Anti-Renters whose votes decided this election.

Gardiner was among the first judges elected on June 7, 1847, to the new New York Court of Appeals. On June 22, he drew the longest term (eight years and a half), and took office on July 5, according to the new State Constitution adopted in 1846. To fill the vacancy in the office of lieutenant governor, a special election was held at the annual State elections, and Fish was elected for the remainder of Gardiner's unexpired term. Gardiner became chief judge in 1854, and held the office until the end of 1855 when his term expired.

== His opinions ==
Judge Gardiner's opinions are reported in Denio's, Comstock's, Selden's and the first three volumes of Reman's reports. Among them are the cases of:

- Miller v. Gable (2 Denio, 492), on charitable uses, holding that chancery, under its general jurisdiction over trusts, will interfere, on behalf of members of a religious corporation to which a fund has been granted, to prevent it from diverting the fund to promote the teaching of doctrines essentially variant from those designated, but not as to lesser shades of doctrine.
- Mayor of New York v. Baily (2 Denio, 433), holding that an action on the case for malfeasance will be against the corporation; if the city be empowered by statute to construct works, the state reserving the power to appoint commissioners to superintend the construction, the acceptance of the act by the city renders it liable for injuries arising for want of skill, or neglect, in building the works.
- Danks v. Quackenbush (1 Comstock, 129), in which he dissented, with three others of the judges, constituting one-half of the court, from the opinion of the four others, that the act of 1842, extending the exemption of personal property from the sale under execution, is unconstitutional and void as to debts contracted before its passage.
- Leggett v. Perkins (2 Comstock, 267), holding that a trust to receive and pay over the rents and profits of land was valid, under the statute authorising a trustee to receive the same and apply them to the use of any person.
- People v. Schuyler (2 Comstock, 173), reversing the decree of the Supreme court, and holding that if the sheriff after the jury have found for a claimant, refuses to deliver the property, the surety on his official bond is liable, though the creditor does not indemnify him, and, where he requires and receives indemnity before selling and judgment is afterwards recovered against him for the erroneous seizure, his sureties, on payment of the judgment, are entitled to be subrogated to the indemnity.
- Chautauqua Co. Bank v. White (2 Selden, 236), holding that an assignment by the debtor to the receiver of all his real property leaves no residuary interest in the debtor, and reversing the decree of the Supreme court, and affirming that of the vice-chancellor.
- Nicholson v. Leavitt (2 Selden, 510), reversing with the concurrence of all the judges, the judgment of the Superior court of the city of New York, and holding that an assignment by insolvent debtors of their property to trustees for the benefit of their creditors, with an authorisation to the trustees to sell the assigned property upon credit, is fraudulent and void as against the creditors of the assignees.
- Talmage v. Pell (3 Selden, 328), on the powers of banking associations, reversing the judgment of the Supreme court.
- Kundolf v. Thalheimer (2 Kernan, 593), on the powers of county courts, reversing the judgment of the Supreme court.

== Later life ==
After his retirement from the Court of Appeals he continued to lend his aid in the administration of justice as a referee. For twenty years, he arbitrated many important causes. He died in Rochester and was buried at Mount Hope Cemetery in Rochester.

== Family ==
In 1831 he married Mary Selkrigg. Their children were Charles A. Gardiner and Celeste M. Gardiner. His oldest brother, William Gardiner, (1787-ca. 1855), resided several years in Lowell, Massachusetts, then removed to Texas, where he died on his plantation near San Antonio. Another brother, Charles (1789–1860) was a merchant in New Orleans. His sister Rebecca (1791-ca. 1818), married Oren Stone, a merchant, and the partner of Governor Seymour's father, and lived at Watertown, New York. Another sister, Dorothy, married Thomas A. Gould, a lawyer of Pittsfield, Massachusetts, where she died in 1857. The youngest sister, Louisa, born about 1800, married Elijah Rhoades, of Manlius, a merchant and New York State Senator.

== Legacy ==
Addison Gardiner is the namesake of Gardiner, New York.

== Sources ==
- Papers of Victory Birdseye The Chancellor Robert R Livingston Masonic Library of Grand Lodge
- Death notice, in NYT on June 6, 1883
- The New York Civil List compiled by Franklin Benjamin Hough (pages 32, 348 and 356; Weed, Parsons and Co., 1858)

Political offices
Preceded by Daniel S. Dickinson	Lieutenant Governor of New York; 1845–1847	Succeeded by Albert Lester; Acting
Legal offices
Preceded by Charles H. Ruggles	Chief Judge of the New York Court of Appeals; 1854–1855	Succeeded by Hiram Denio
