= Dixie Selden =

American painter

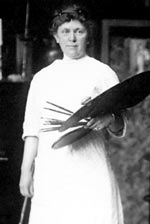
- Born: February 28, 1868; Cincinnati, Ohio
- Died: November 15, 1935 (aged 67); Cincinnati, Ohio
- Education: McMicken School of Design, now Cincinnati Art Academy; Frank Duveneck; William Merritt Chase; Henry B. Snell; Artists in Paris and Vienna
- Known for: Painting
- Notable work: Frank Duveneck (1918); Boats in Harbor (circa 1920); Judge A. M. Cochran of Maysville
- Movement: Munich School (early), Impressionism (after 1909)

Dixie Selden (February 28, 1868 – November 15, 1935) was an American artist. She studied with Frank Duveneck, who was a mentor and significant influence, and William Merritt Chase, who introduced her to Impressionism. Selden painted portraits of Americans and made genre paintings, landscapes and seascapes from her travels within the country and to Europe, Asia, the Middle East and Mexico. She helped found and was twice the president of the Women's Art Club of Cincinnati. Her works have been exhibited in the United States. She was one of the Daughters of the American Revolution and on the Social Register.

== Early life ==
Dixie Selden, named for the song Dixie Land, was born in Cincinnati, Ohio. She was one of three children of John Roger Selden and Martha Peyton McMillon Selden. Her parents had ancestors from northern states, New York and Connecticut, who fought during the Revolutionary War, (Note: Selden, a Daughter of the American Revolution, was a descendant of Levi Smith, of Massachusetts, on her mother's side, and Colonel Samuel Selden, of Connecticut. See Selden family.) and her father fought for the Union during the American Civil War, but they were sympathetic to the concerns of the South (aka Dixie). When she was two years old, the family moved to Covington, Kentucky, across the Ohio River from Cincinnati. Dixie Selden was left an only child when two of her siblings died when they were infants. Her parents indulged her artistic abilities, including building her a studio. They took her on two tours of Europe in 1878 and 1882 to 1883.

Her parents were active in Cincinnati and Covington social circles and organizations, including The Shakespeare Society. Her mother, Martha, was an associate member of the Covington Art Club and a member of the local literary society, the Culture Club.

== Art education and career ==
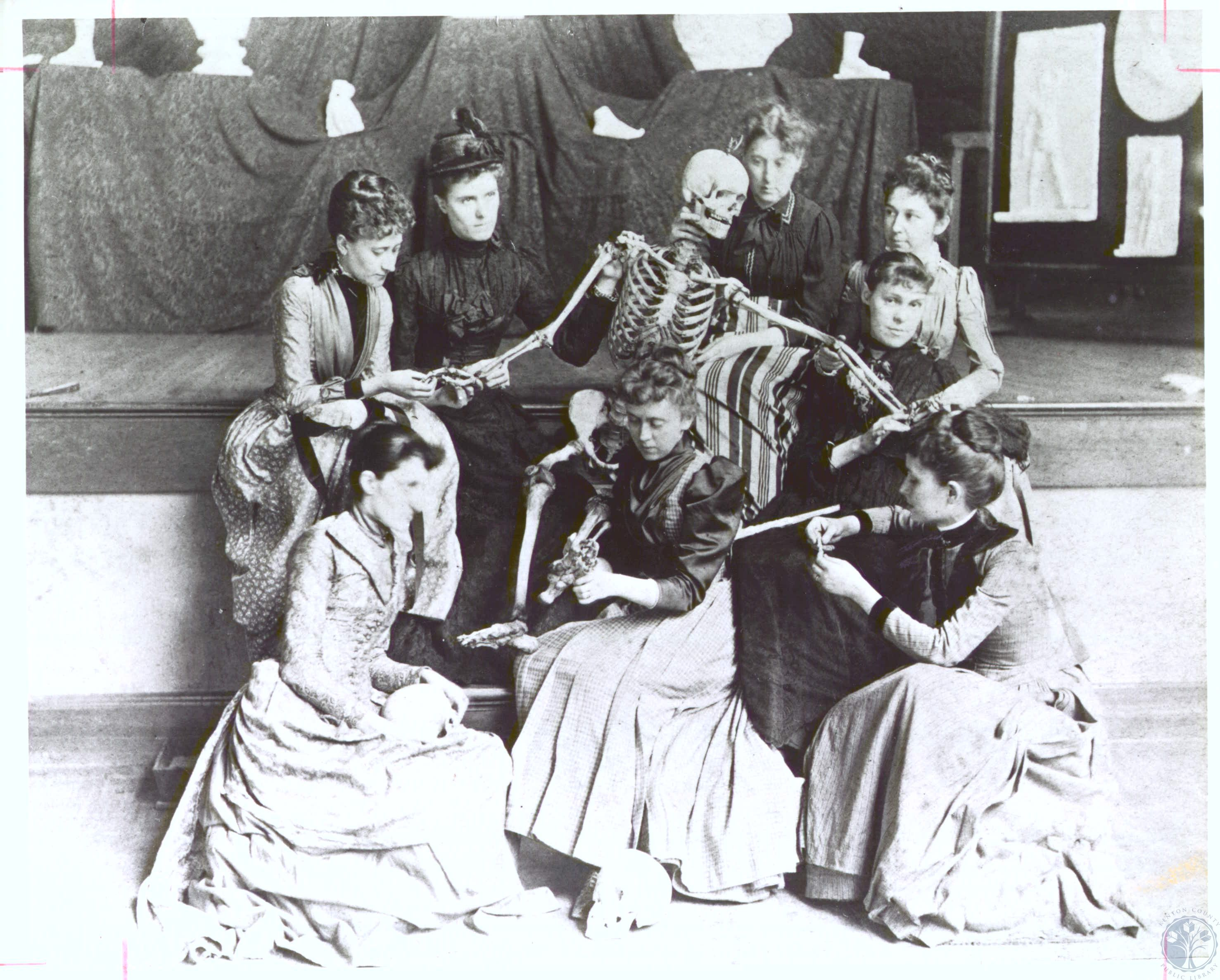
Frank Duveneck's class: Dixie Selden, middle bottom; Mattie Furber, bottom left

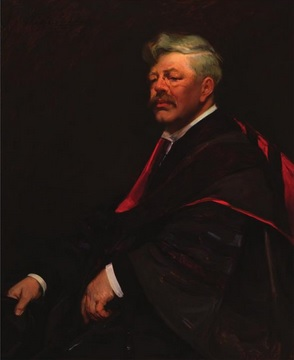
Dixie Selden, Frank Duveneck, 1918, oil on canvas, Cincinnati Art Museum

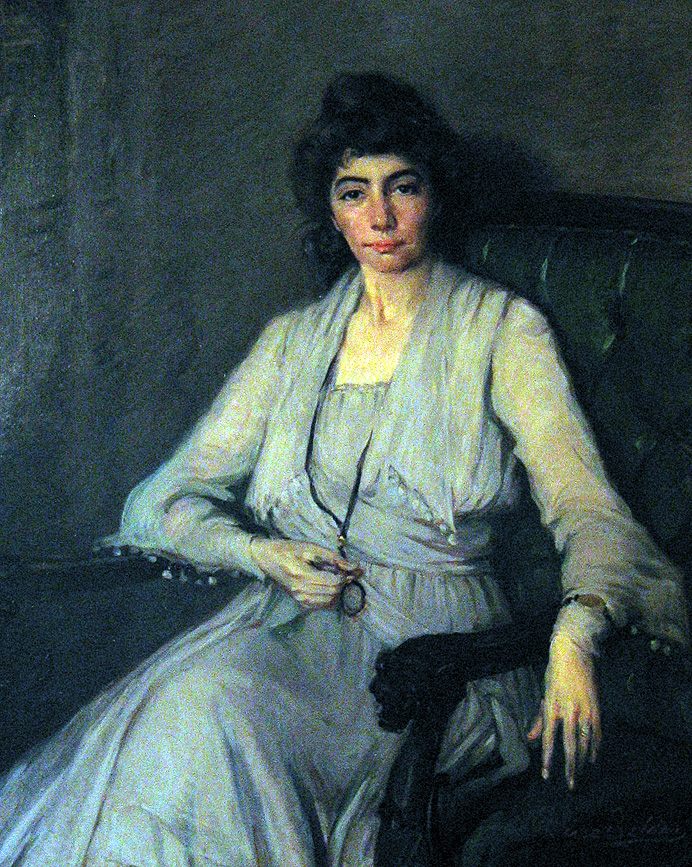
Dixie Selden, Madeline McDowell Breckinridge, 1920, Ashland, The Henry Clay Estate, Lexington, Kentucky.

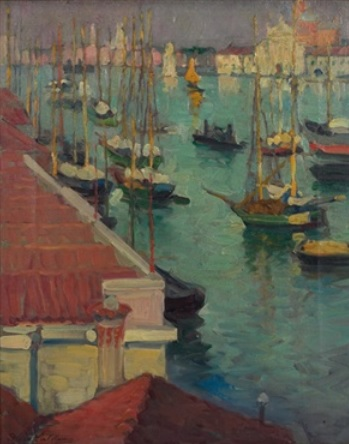
Dixie Selden, Boats in Harbor, circa 1920

Selden attended Bartholomew's Girls' School in Cincinnati. She enrolled in the McMicken School of Design, now the Art Academy of Cincinnati, in 1884 and studied there off an on until 1912 under Fernand H. Lungren and Frank Duveneck, also from Covington. She studied drawing and painting with oils and watercolor. Selden was one of Duveneck's favorite students and he became her mentor who recommended her for commissions and assisted her in having her works shown in "male-dominated" exhibitions. Duveneck also greatly influenced Selden's style. According to author Estill Curtis Pennington, "Frank Duveneck and his followers, Dixie Selden and John Alberts, continued to paint in a venerable high-art style, informed by seventeenth-century precedent and lit by Impressionist innovation."

Selden won prizes for her oil paintings and portraits that she began to exhibit at the Covington Art Club in 1890. She exhibited four paintings in 1891 at the Cincinnati Art Club. Selden attained the status of a professional artist in 1892 when her works were shown with those of Duveneck, Charles Henry Sharp, Henry Farny, Edward Henry Potthast, and Frank H. Lungren. That year, Selden helped found the Women's Art Club of Cincinnati and was its president twice. She began to work in Covington in 1894 as an illustrator and portraitist. Selden painted Daughter of the Revolution, a self-portrait, in 1894, but she terminated her membership in the Daughters of the American Revolution in 1899 for unknown reasons. Beginning in 1895, Selden spent the summers in Edgartown, Massachusetts, Boothbay, Maine, and in France at Normandy and Brittany. During her visits, she made genre works, landscapes, and seascapes. Selden studied in Venice, Italy with William Merritt Chase. Her style changed considerably after studying with Chase, as she moved from the darker influence of the Munich School to a lighter, impressionistic style after 1909. She also studied in Vienna and Paris with other artists, and in St. Ives, England with Henry B. Snell.

Selden traveled extensively with fellow artist Emma Mendenhall (1873–1964) throughout the United States, Europe, Mexico, China, Japan, and the Middle East, painting landscapes, genre scenes, and portraits "with a "broad stroke and sprightly brush." The images captured people and street and market scenes. According to biographer Richard M. Sacksteder, she is "one of the premier Impressionists from the Greater Cincinnati area", best known for her "lively landscapes" and portraits. Selden painted portraits of Frank Duveneck, which is considered "her most powerful portrait"; (Note: The portrait of Frank Duveneck was used as an illustration for the Pennsylvania Academy of the Fine Arts exhibition catalog in 1919. The exhibited painting received "much favorable comment" and was Duveneck's favorite portrait of himself. It was also exhibited at the Cincinnati Art Museum and the National Academy of Design in New York.) Mrs. Albert Berne and Her Sons, Mrs. Mary Emery, and Judge A. M. Cochran of Maysville, Kentucky. Selden also painted images of domestic life, portraits of family members and pets, and flowers. She used a turpentine-thinned varnish on her paintings.

Selden reached national acclaim and her works were exhibited and won prizes throughout the United States. Her art was shown at the Art Institute of Chicago, Pennsylvania Academy of the Fine Arts, New York Academy of Art, and Cincinnati Art Museum, including a 1910 exhibition of her works with those of Emma Mendenhall and Annie G. Sykes.

Selden was a member of the National Association of Women Painters and Sculptors, American Women's Art Club, National Arts Club, Southern States Art League, Louisville Art Association, Covington Art Club, and Cincinnati McDowell Society.

Her painting, Boats in Harbor, was sold for US$32,500 in 2011. The maximum price paid for one of her paintings is reported to be $62,100 by Blouin Art Info.

== Personal life and death ==
Called "the little one" by Duveneck, she was a petite woman who had a "vivacious, joyous personality" and established many close, lifelong friendships. Having never married, Selden enjoyed a long friendship with fellow Cincinnati artist, Emma Mendenhall.

Her mother, Martha Selden, died in 1907 and father, John, died the following year. Selden stayed on in her parents' home and then in other residences in Covington before moving in 1910 to Walnut Hills, Cincinnati, where she was listed as a resident of the city on the Social Register in 1918. Selden died suddenly of a heart attack the night of a dinner party in her Walnut Hills house in 1935. She is buried in Highland Cemetery, Fort Mitchell, Kentucky.

A memorial exhibition was held at the Cincinnati Art Museum from March 5 through April 8, 1936. In 2003, 2006, 2007 and 2008, her works were exhibited with other city artists in the "Panorama of Cincinnati Art" annual shows at the Cincinnati Art Galleries. Herbert Greer French said in the foreword of the exhibition catalog, "Honest and forceful in her art, as in her life, she gave of her best to every undertaking. Should her painting give to those who see it in the future some measure of beauty of spirit which was hers, the world would be better, even as those who knew her in the flesh were the better for that privilege."

== Collections ==
- Butler Institute of American Art, Youngstown, Ohio: Cityscape
- Cincinnati Art Museum, Ohio: 79th and Riverside Drive, 1915; Frank Duveneck, 1918 Aunt Patsy Swiney, 1919 and others
- Covington Art Club, Kentucky: Public Square, Ragusa 1924
- Federal Court Building, Lexington, Kentucky: Judge A. M. J Cochran of Maysville
- Johnson Collection, Spartanburg, South Carolina: Blue Sail, Concarneau
- Kenton County Public Library, Kentucky: After the Shower, Copenhagen, The Woman Hanging Laundry, Balloon Ascent at Night.
- Kentucky State Historical Society: Brittany Woman Knitting
- Miami University Art Museum, Oxford, Ohio: Carcassonne, 1922; Brittany Quai, 1929; Olive Tree, 1933;

== Gallery ==
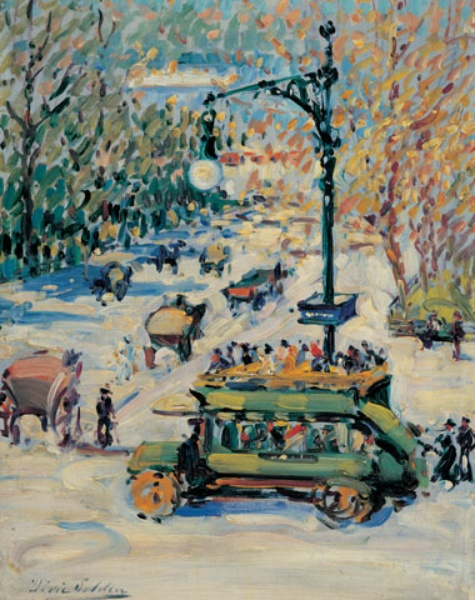
79th and Riverside Drive, 1915, oil on canvas, Cincinnati Art Museum

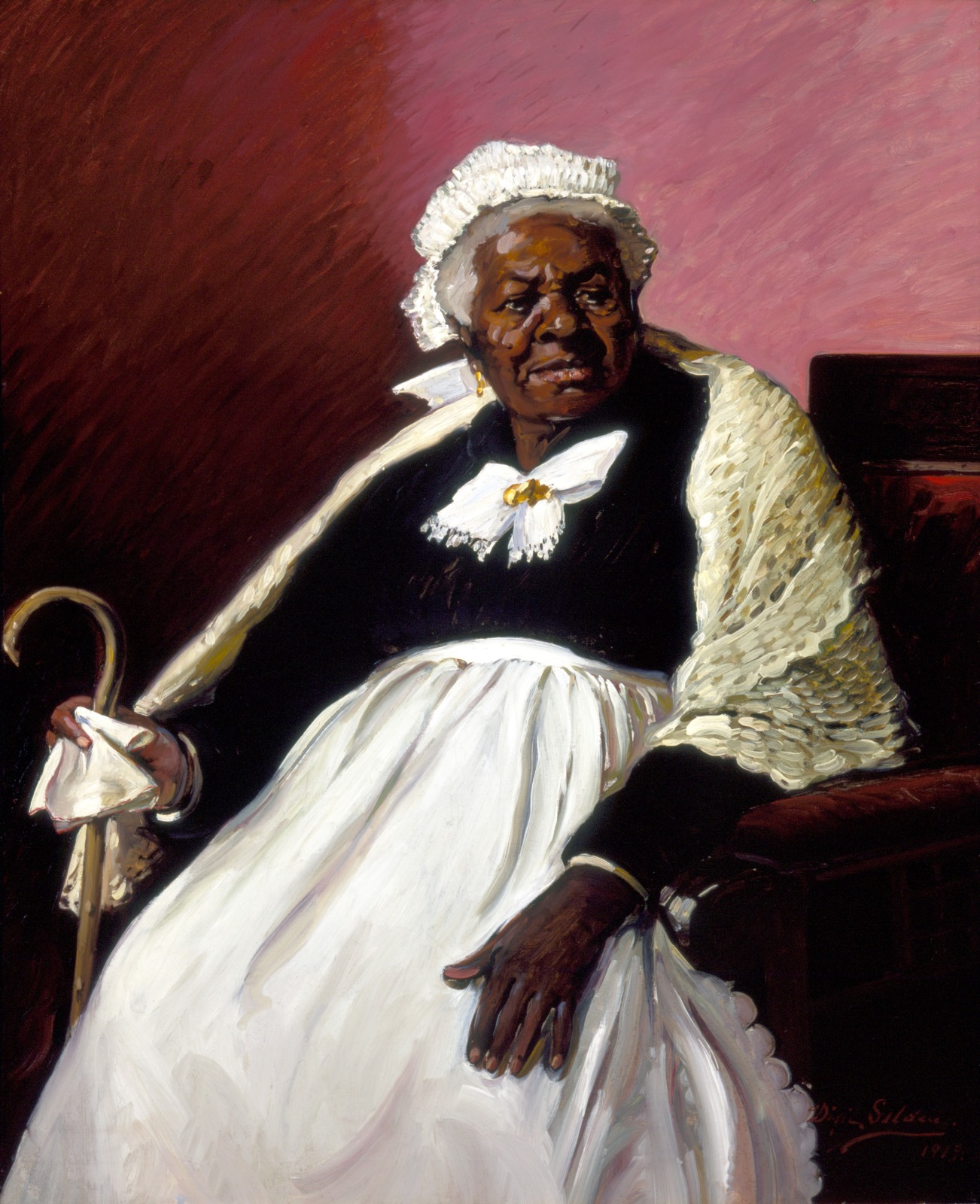
Aunt Patsy Swiney, 1919, Cincinnati Art Museum

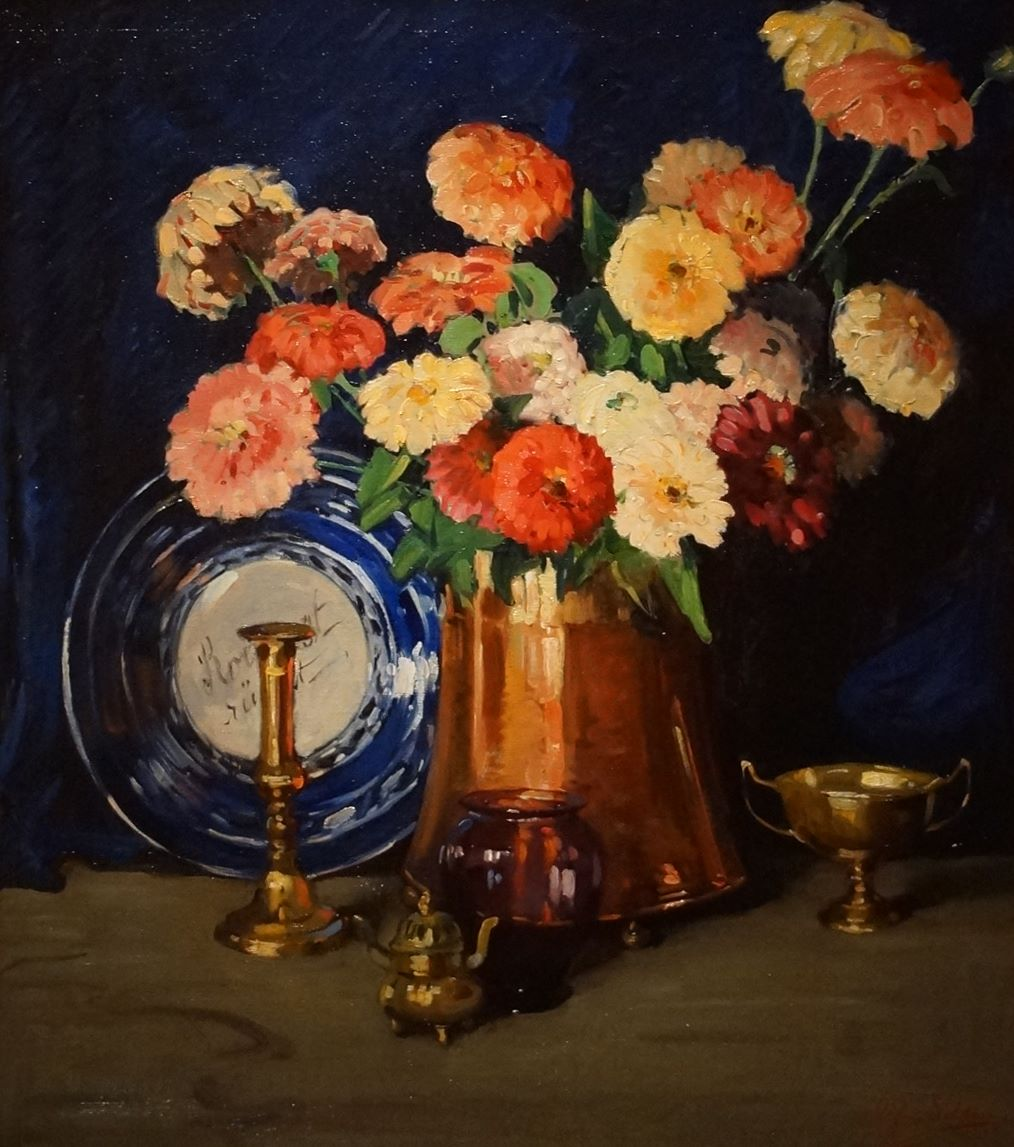
Still-life, c. 1926, on loan to Cincinnati Art Museum

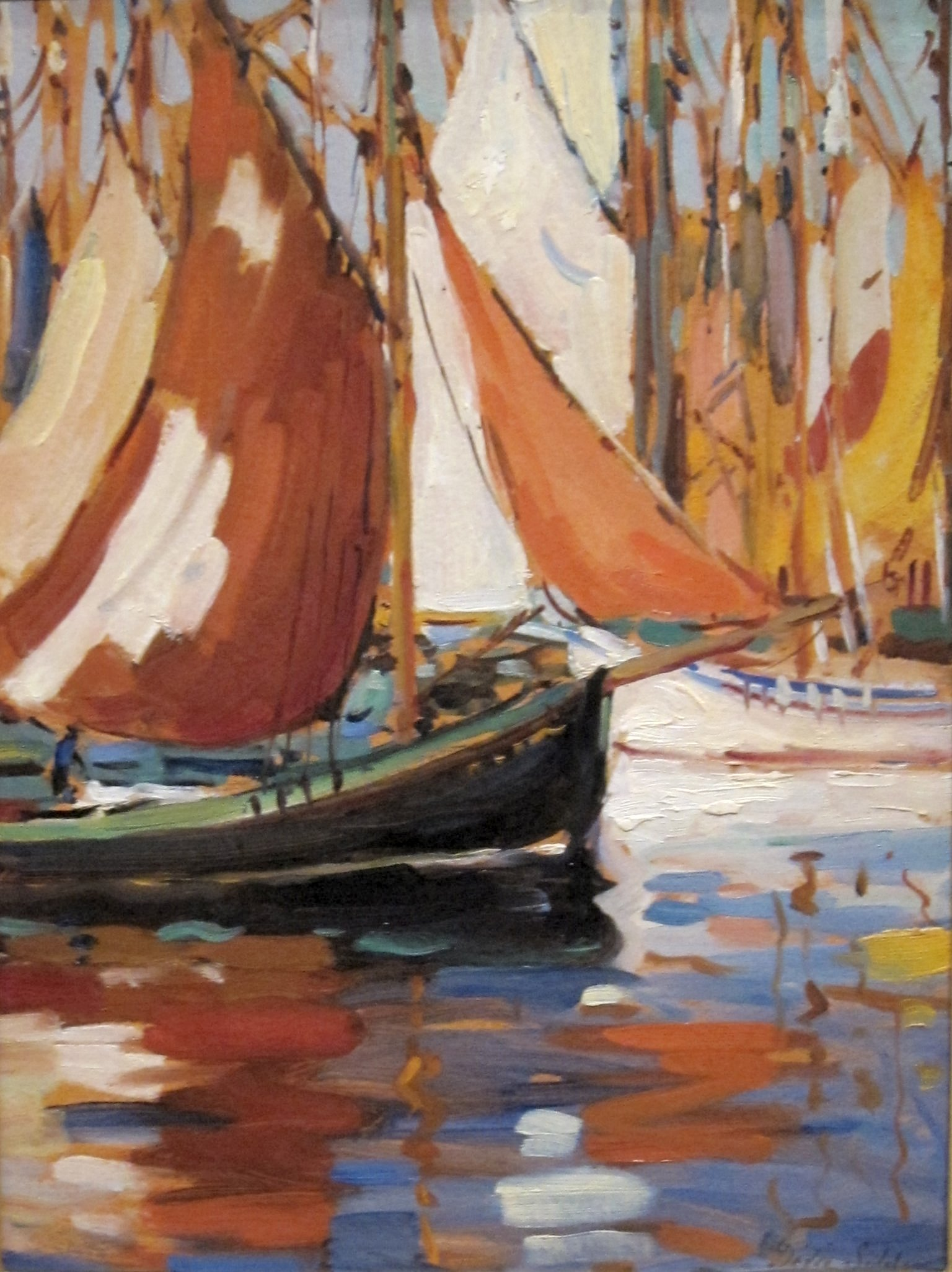
Patched Sail, c. 1929, on loan to Cincinnati Art Museum
