= Henry Lee Scott =

U.S. Army colonel (1814–1886)

- Born: October 3, 1814; New Bern, North Carolina, U.S.
- Died: January 6, 1886 (aged 71); New York City, New York, U.S.
- Burial place: New Cathedral Cemetery, Baltimore, Maryland, U.S.
- Education: United States Military Academy
- Spouse: Cornelia Scott (m. 1849–1885)
- Children: 1
- Relatives: Winfield Scott (father-in-law)
- Military career
- Allegiance: United States; Union (American Civil War)
- Service: United States Army; Union Army
- Service years: 1833–1862
- Rank: Colonel
- Unit: U.S. Army Infantry Branch
- Commands: Inspector General of the United States Army; Union Army Forces of New York City
- Wars: Second Seminole War; Mexican–American War; Siege of Veracruz; Battle of Cerro Gordo; Battle of Contreras; Battle of Churubusco; Battle of Chapultepec; Battle for Mexico City; American Civil War

Henry L. Scott (October 3, 1814 – January 6, 1886) was a career officer in the United States Army. An 1833 graduate of the United States Military Academy, he was the longtime aide-de-camp to his father-in-law, General Winfield Scott. He served in the Second Seminole War, Mexican–American War, and American Civil War and resigned effective October 31, 1862. After retiring, Scott resided in New York City and authored 1863's Military Dictionary.

== Early life and start of career ==
Henry Lee Scott was born in New Bern, North Carolina on October 3, 1814, a son of Dr. Andrew Scott and Margaret Sarah (Guion) Scott. He was raised and educated in New Bern, and in 1829 began attendance at the United States Military Academy (West Point). He graduated in 1833 ranked 41st of 43. Among his classmates who later attained general officer rank in the U.S. Army were John G. Barnard, George Washington Cullum, Rufus King, Benjamin Alvord, and Henry W. Wessells. In addition, classmate Daniel Ruggles was a brigadier general in the Confederate States Army. Francis Henney Smith supported the Confederacy during the Civil War and was a major general in the Virginia Militia. Henry du Pont supported the Union during the Civil War and served as a major general in the Delaware Militia. Among Scott's prominent classmates who did not become general officers were William Wallace Smith Bliss, John Addison Thomas, and Abraham Myers.

Upon graduating, Scott was commissioned as a second lieutenant by brevet, to date from July 1, 1833. He was assigned to the 4th Infantry Regiment, and posted to the garrison at Baton Rouge, Louisiana. During 1834, he served with his regiment in Alabama during the removal of the Chickasaw people to Indian Territory in accordance with the Treaty of Pontotoc Creek. After returning to Baton Rouge, Lee moved with the 4th Infantry when it was posted to New Orleans. In the summer of 1835, the 4th Infantry served at the Bay of St. Louis, Mississippi, after which it returned to New Orleans.

Scott received his second lieutenant's commission on January 31, 1836. He served in Florida during the Second Seminole War in 1836 and 1837, including skirmishes at Camp Izard in February and March 1836, the battle at Oloklikaha in March 1836, and the battle of Thlonotosassa Creek in April 1836. During 1837 and 1838, he took part in the removal of the Cherokee people to Indian Territory. On March 1, 1838, he was promoted to first lieutenant. He was the regimental adjutant from November 1838 to April 1840, during the regiment's service at Fort Gibson, Indian Territory.

== Continued career ==
Scott performed recruiting duty in New York City from 1840 to 1842. In June 1842, he was appointed aide-de-camp to Winfield Scott, the Commanding General of the United States Army. He continued in this role until October 1861, while often performing other duties in addition. Scott was promoted to captain in February 1847. During the Mexican–American War, he served as chief of the staff Scott organized for his command of the Army of Mexico. Battles in which he participated included the Siege of Veracruz, Battle of Cerro Gordo, Battle of Contreras, Battle of Churubusco, Battle of Chapultepec, and Battle for Mexico City. In August 1847, he was promoted to brevet major in recognition of his meritorious conduct during the Contreras and Churubusco fights. In September 1847, he received promotion to brevet lieutenant colonel to recognize his meritorious performance of duty at Chapultepec.

In 1849, Scott married Cornelia Scott (no relation), Winfield Scott's daughter. They were the parents of one child who lived to adulthood, Winfield Scott (1851–1921).

== Later career ==
Scott served as acting Judge Advocate of the army's Eastern Division from September 1848 to September 1850. In March 1855, he was promoted to permanent lieutenant colonel. With the outbreak of the American Civil War in early 1861, Scott was promoted to colonel in May and assigned as the Inspector General of the United States Army. From August to October 1861, he was commander of Union Army forces in New York City.

Beginning in October 1861, Scott was on an extended leave of absence to convalesce from disabilities incurred earlier in his military career. He remained in Europe until the end of the war, and resigned his commission in October 1862, but it was not accepted until late 1865. According to some wartime newspaper accounts, Scott took his leave of absence after being accused by General George B. McClellan of providing details of Union plans and orders to members of the Confederacy. In letters published in 1867, McClellan and General Schuyler Hamilton told Scott that McClellan had never suspected him of spying for the Confederacy, had never accused him, and did not know how the story had originated.

Scott was a member of the Aztec Club of 1847. Following the Civil War, he was promoted to brigadier general by brevet, but he declined the honor. He died in New York City on January 6, 1886. Scott was buried at New Cathedral Cemetery in Baltimore, Maryland.

== Works by ==
- Military Dictionary. New York, NY: D. Van Nostrand. 1863 – via Google Books.
