= Seldon (company) =

British technology company

Seldon.io
- Company type: Private
- Founded: 28 August 2014; 12 years ago
- Founder: Alex Housley
- Industry: Machine Learning; Information technology Artificial Intelligence
- Products: Seldon Core 2, Seldon Core+, LLM Module, Alibi Detect, Alibi Explain, ML Server
- Parent: Independent
- Website: seldon.io

Seldon Technologies Limited (commonly referred to as Seldon) was a British technology company founded in 2014, and headquartered in London, England. It made real-time MLOps and LLMOps for enterprise deployment and monitoring of machine learning models, through its data-centric, modular framework called Core 2.

== History ==
Seldon was founded in 2014, and joined the Barclays Techstars Incubator in 2015 to develop tooling for AI, and as of 2020 had deployed more than 1 million machine learning models. Seldon was a guest advisor to the UK's All-Party Parliamentary Group for Artificial Intelligence.

The primary focus of the company was building cloud agnostic Machine Learning (ML) deployment tooling; and had worked in partnership Google, Red Hat, IBM and Amazon Web Services.

In 2019 they raised a €3 million seed funding round led by Amadeus Capital Partners, along with Global Brain Corporation, Techstars, and other existing investors.

Raised a £7.1M Series A co-led by AlbionVC and Cambridge Innovation Capital in November 2020.

Announced a Series B funding round resulting in an investment of $20M led by Bright Pixel with significant contribution from existing investors

== Products ==
- Seldon Core 2 is a popular data-centric, modular framework for MLOps, used to package, deploy, monitor and manage production machine learning models.
- Seldon Core+ is an accelerator program with hands-on support, plus option to add modules, to ensure your machine learning projects are set up and maintained efficiently, giving you peace of mind.
- Seldon’s Large Language Models (LLM) Module with Core+ is the next step in your AI evolution through additional LLMOps-specific capabilities. The module simplifies the deployment, support for common design patterns (RAG, prompting, and memory) and lifecycle management of Generative AI (GenAI) applications and LLMs.
- Seldon's Alibi Explain, with Core+, brings advanced Data Science (DS) explainability capabilities to production Machine Learning (ML) pipelines. The module offers a rich suite of algorithms for interpreting model predictions across tabular, image, and text data, that supports both classification and regression tasks. These capabilities help data scientists and ML practitioners debug, trust, and govern machine learning models effectively.
- Seldon's Alibi Detect Module, with Core+, brings advanced Data Science (DS) monitoring capabilities to production Machine Learning (ML) pipelines. The module provides a rich suite of algorithms for detecting outliers, data drift, and adversarial inputs, both online and offline, across tabular, image, text, and time series data. By surfacing shifts in data distributions and model behavior early, Alibi Detect helps teams improve model quality, maintain trust, and comply with governance requirements such as the EU AI Act, the US Executive Order 14110, the UK Pro-Innovation AI Regulation Framework and the Canadian Artificial Intelligence and Data Act.
- Seldon's Model Performance Metrics (MPM) Module with Core+ is the next step in your AI evolution through data science model evaluation capabilities. The module enables data scientists and ML practitioners to optimize production classification & regression models with model quality insights.
