= Samuel L. Selden =

American judge (1800–1876)

Chief Judge of the New York Court of Appeals
- In office January 1, 1862 – July 1, 1862
- Preceded by: George F. Comstock
- Succeeded by: Hiram Denio

Personal details
- Born: October 12, 1800 Lyme, Connecticut
- Died: September 20, 1876 (aged 75) Rochester, New York
- Party: Democratic
- Spouse: Susan Matilda Ward (m. 1831)

Samuel Lee Selden (October 12, 1800 – September 20, 1876) was an American lawyer and politician from New York. He was Chief Judge of the New York Court of Appeals in 1862.

== Life ==
Selden was born in Lyme, Connecticut in 1800 and moved to Rochester, New York in 1821 following his sister who had married Rochester lawyer Joseph Spencer. Selden studied law with Addison Gardiner, and formed a partnership with him after being admitted to the bar in 1825. On July 27, 1831, Selden married Susan Matilda Ward.

From 1831 to 1837, he was First Judge of the Monroe County Court.

From 1847 to 1855, he was a justice of the New York Supreme Court.

He was a judge of the New York Court of Appeals from 1856 to 1862, elected on the Hard Democratic ticket. He was Chief Judge from January to July 1862 when he resigned from the bench, and his brother Henry R. Selden was appointed to fill the vacancy. He died in 1876 in Rochester, New York.

== Sources ==
- Political Graveyard
- The New York Civil List compiled by Franklin Benjamin Hough (pages 348, 352 and 362; Weed, Parsons and Co., 1858)
- History of the Pioneer Settlement of Phelps and Gorham's Purchase, and Morris' Reserve: Embracing the Counties of Monroe, Ontario, Livingston, Yates, Steuben, Most of Wayne and Allegany, and Parts of Orleans, Genesee, and Wyoming by Orsamus Turner (William Alling, 1851; page 613)

Legal offices
Preceded by George F. Comstock	Chief Judge of the New York Court of Appeals; 1862	Succeeded by Hiram Denio
