= Washington Monument syndrome =

Closure of high-profile government symbols or services to spotlight budget cuts

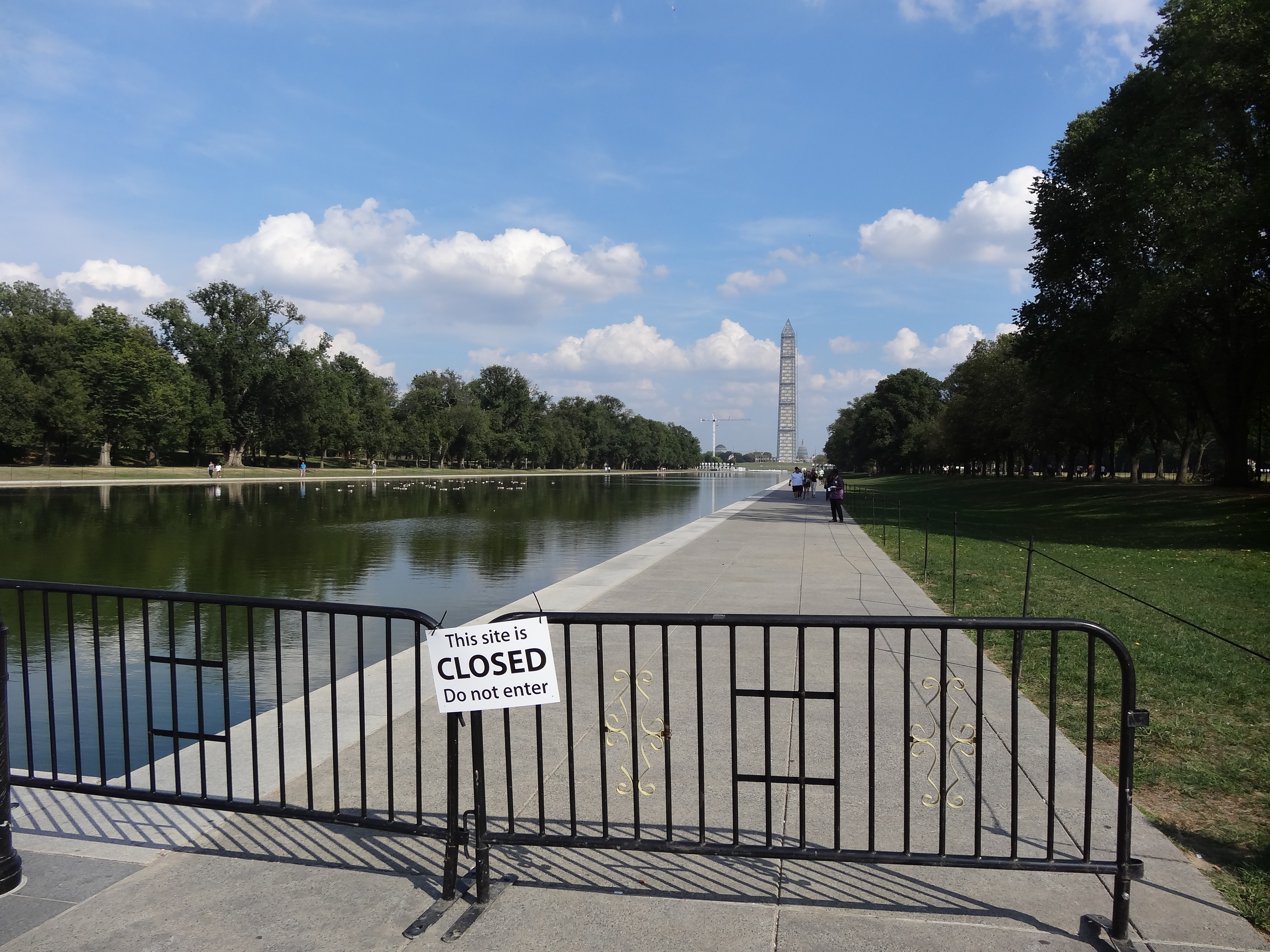
The National Mall closed to the public during the 2013 federal government shutdown

The Washington Monument syndrome, also known as the Mount Rushmore syndrome or the firemen first principle, is a term used to describe the phenomenon of government agencies in the United States cutting the most visible or appreciated service provided by the government when faced with budget cuts. It has been used in reference to cuts in popular services such as national parks and libraries or to valued public employees such as teachers and firefighters, with the Washington Monument and Mount Rushmore being two of the most visible landmarks maintained by the National Park Service. This is done to put pressure on the public and lawmakers to rescind budget cuts. The term can also refer to claims by lawmakers that a proposed budget cut would hinder "essential" government services (firefighters, police, education, etc.).

Although intended to highlight the government's value to voters, it can also be aimed at lawmakers themselves. Faced with budget cuts in the 1970s, Amtrak announced plans to cease train routes in the home districts of several members of Congress.

The term was first used after George Hartzog, the seventh director of the National Park Service, closed popular national parks such as the Washington Monument and Grand Canyon National Park for two days a week in 1969. In response to complaints, Congress eventually restored the funding. In 1972, Hartzog was fired by the Nixon administration, and this action is often incorrectly cited as a contributing factor.

The architectural historian Nicole Sully has termed the shutdown of the "Pandacam" at the National Zoo and the fencing off of the National World War II Memorial during the United States federal government shutdown of 2013 to be examples of the "syndrome". Sully writes: "In reality, the closure of these monuments was likely to have been undertaken, firstly, for reasons of public liability, maintenance and security, and secondly, to ensure that the shutdown was made visible to the public – and it was for this latter reason that it was widely questioned by the public and the media."

== See also ==
- Malicious compliance
