= Malicious compliance =

Intentionally causing harm by following a superior's orders

Malicious compliance (also known as malicious obedience) is the behavior of strictly following orders, laws, and rules to the letter, ignoring expectations that go without saying and the spirit of the requirement. This usually involves working no earlier or later than one has to and completing legally required safety checks even when they are perceived as unnecessary and usually ignored. Malicious compliance is a common method used by unions when they cannot strike and puts emphasis on the unpaid work laborers do for their companies. A form of passive-aggressive behavior, it is often associated with poor management-labor relationships, micromanagement, a generalized lack of confidence in leadership, and resistance to changes perceived as pointless, duplicative, dangerous, or otherwise undesirable. It is common in organizations with top-down management structures lacking morale, leadership, or mutual trust. In U.S. law, this practice has been theorized as a form of uncivil obedience, in contrast to civil disobedience.

== Definition ==
There is no universally agreed-upon definition of malicious compliance. Among those ventured, a principle characteristic includes establishing 'malice' as a behavior "always meant in some way to damage, humiliate or threaten the established power structure, regardless of what level that may be".

Fundamental to establishing malice is whether there is any financial or other remunerative incentive in acting contrary to good practice, as well as the likelihood of penalties and their severity for non-compliance, both of which mitigate the charge.

Another fundamental characteristic is that the malicious action can be taken without overt risk, as one is complying to the letter of a directive. Nevertheless, repercussions may follow, often indirectly, whether from the supervisor, co-workers possibly burdened by the consequences of malicious obedience, or others higher in the management structure.

The definition becomes grey when countering motivations are introduced, such as complying with what may be construed as a wrong-headed directive with the intention of drawing attention to the consequence, as to highlight an inefficient procedure or the managerial inadequacies of a superior.

Some perceive malicious compliance as a tool for effecting change, such as social change, or meeting goals, such as production quotas, even at the expense of efficiency and the organization.

Other motivations include office politics, jealousy, revenge on a supervisor, and simply "sticking it to" an organization one is unhappy with.

== Examples ==
Some possible examples of malicious compliance include:

- A group of U.S. firefighters were required for safety reasons to wear self-contained breathing apparatus against their will. In response, they merely wore the equipment on their backs but did not use it, complying with the letter of the mandate. This made their work less efficient than if they had not been wearing the equipment at all. A subsequent mandate required them to wear and use the gear.
- An artist resorts to "a conspicuous and hyperbolic compliance with established laws, rules, and mandates" to strike back at what he perceives as an unfair tax code. Angry at being denied certain deductions on his tax returns, California artist Lowell Darling undertook a "series of creative endeavors exploiting uncivil obedience" intending to deconstruct the so-called hobby loss rule of the U.S. Tax Code. By employing fictional art projects and organizations, he "rigorously and ironically" fulfilled those factors said to indicate a profit-seeking intent. He later challenged electioneering norms and campaign finance rules in a mock run for governor.
- A project manager goes along with a project, knowing it is impossible to complete. While the rest of their team knows the task is insurmountable, they cut corners to achieve some sort of result.
- A transgender man enters and uses a bathroom designated for women. The act highlights what the laws and policies of bathroom bills were ostensibly designed to prevent: the situational discomfort of gender-specific public bathrooms mandated to only be used by people according to their sex assigned at birth.
- A United States public school district frames and hangs a dollar bill in each of its schools to fulfill its obligation to a law requiring the national motto "In God We Trust" be prominently displayed.

Malicious compliance is common in production situations in which employees and middle management are measured based on meeting certain quotas or performance projections. Examples include:

- Employees at a factory ship products to customers too early so their inventory is reduced to meet a projection.
- Production plants refuse shipments of raw material at month-end so that monthly completion projections are met, even if doing so causes a negative impact on customer deliverables and overall production figures.

== Responses ==
It has been theorised that managers might avoid malicious compliance by not making excessive, contradictory, or incomprehensible demands of employees as well as clarifying policies.

== See also ==
- Counterproductive work behavior
- Fall guy
- False consciousness
- Gaming the system
- Italian strike
- Learned helplessness
- Peer pressure
- Perverse incentive
- Shill
- The Good Soldier Švejk
- Throffer
- Tyranny
- Washington Monument syndrome
- Work-to-rule
- Civil disobedience
- War of Position
- Parallel Polis
