= Washington Monument =

U.S. national memorial in Washington, D.C.

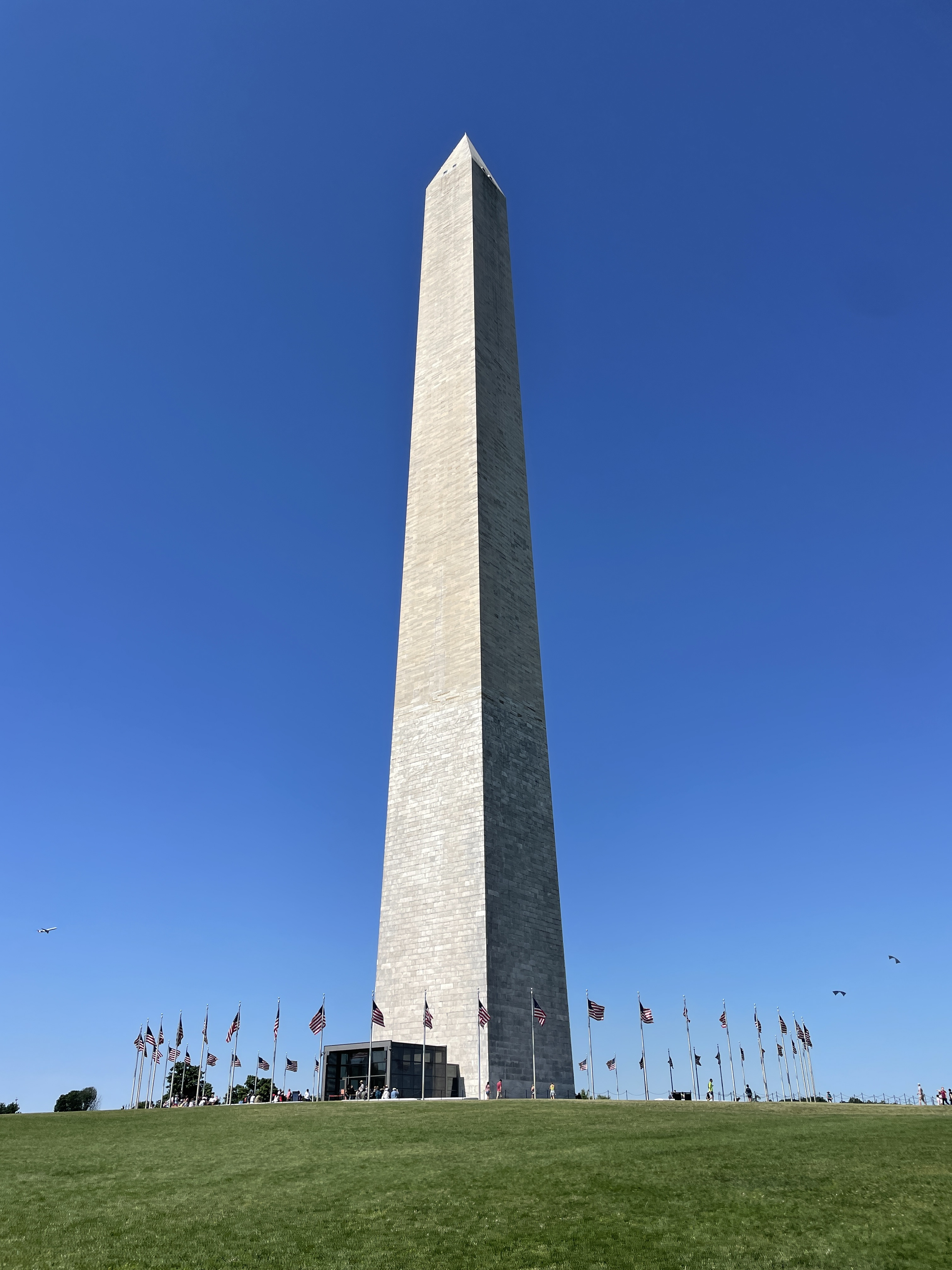
- The Washington Monument in Washington, D.C., in 2022

- Location within Central Washington, D.C. Location within the District of Columbia Location within the United States

Record height
- Tallest in the world from 1884 to 1889^{[I]}
- Preceded by: Cologne Cathedral
- Surpassed by: Eiffel Tower

General information
- Status: Completed
- Location: 2 15th Street NW, Washington, D.C., 20024, National Mall, Washington D.C., United States
- Coordinates: 38°53′22″N 77°2′7″W
- Year built: 1848–1854, 1877–1888
- Groundbreaking: 1848
- Construction started: July 4, 1848
- Construction stopped: 1854–1877
- Topped-out: December 6, 1884
- Completed: 1888
- Opening: October 9, 1888
- Inaugurated: February 21, 1885
- Renovated: 1992–1993, 1998–2002, 2012–2019
- Cost: $1,187,710
- Owner: National Park Service

Height
- Height: 555 ft (169 m)
Other information
Technical details
| Lifts/elevators | 1 |
- Grounds: 106.01 acres (42.90 ha)

Design and construction
- Architect: Robert Mills
- Developer: United States Army Corps of Engineers
- Engineer: Thomas Lincoln Casey Sr.
- Main contractor: United States Army Corps of Engineers

Other information
- Public transit: Smithsonian metro station

Website
- www.nps.gov/wamo/index.htm

Site notes
- Governing body: National Park Service
- Visitors: 204,489 (in 2025)

U.S. National Register of Historic Places
- Designated: October 15, 1966
- Reference no.: 66000035

U.S. National Memorial

D.C. Inventory of Historic Sites
- Designated: November 8, 1964
- Reference no.: 655

The Washington Monument is a 555-foot (169 m) tall obelisk on the National Mall in Washington, D.C., built to commemorate George Washington, a Founding Father of the United States and the nation's first president. Standing east of the Reflecting Pool and the Lincoln Memorial, the monument is made of bluestone gneiss for the foundation and of granite for the construction. The outside facing consists of three different kinds of white marble, as the building process was repeatedly interrupted. The monument stands 554 feet 7 11/32 inches (169.046 m) tall, according to U.S. National Geodetic Survey measurements in 2013 and 2014. (Note: Several heights have been specified, all of which exclude the foundation, whose top is 15 feet 8 inches (4.78 m) above the pre-construction ground level. The foundation is surrounded by a grassy knoll, which serves as a buttress for the monument's foundation and effectively places the monument's foundation below ground level.: 554 feet 7 11/32 inches (169.046 m) according to the National Geodetic Survey (NGS) using the criteria of the Council on Tall Buildings and Urban Habitat (CTBUH), that is, from the "level of the lowest, significant, open-air, pedestrian entrance" to the highest point of the building. From among four candidate points suggested by the NGS, the CTBUH chose a point on the entry ramp installed in 1975 where it crosses the outer face of the marble facade of the monument. Measured 2013–14 and reported February 16, 2015. This is also its new above-ground height because the ground at the shaft was raised in 1975 to match the ramp. The ground surrounding the shaft was replaced by granite pavers during 2004–05 to match the raised ground level and the ramp. This height is 22.0 centimeters (8 5/8 in) above four "CASEY marks", 2 1/2-inch-diameter (6.4 cm) brass bolt heads whose shafts are inserted vertically into the topmost level of the foundation just outside the four corners of the monument. These CASEY marks were set flush with the lower surface of the marble blocks. The NGS thinks they were likely used by Col. Thomas Lincoln Casey, the engineer in charge of construction, to determine the traditional height in 1884. The floor at the elevator is now 13.9 centimeters (5 1/2 in) above this pedestrian entrance, and 35.9 centimeters (14 1/8 in) above the CASEY marks. The highest point of the monument is a one-millimeter-diameter dimple atop the aluminum apex.; 555 feet 5 1/8 inches (169.294 m) according to the National Park Service. Measured and reported in 1884 by Col. Thomas Lincoln Casey, the engineer in charge of construction. It was measured from the top of the foundation (the lowest marble joint or the door-sills of the two empty doorways), which was in place in 1884. This is the traditional height of the monument that became moot when the pavement or ground next to the monument was raised in 1975.; 554 feet 11 1/2 inches (169.151 m) according to architectural drawings in the Historic American Buildings Survey (1994), pavement at shaft to tip. This height is comparable to the NGS height because it was also determined after the ramp was installed in 1975.; None of these heights include a set of lightning rods surrounding the monument's aluminum apex. An old set was installed in 1934, which protruded above its tip by 6 inches (15 cm). In 2013 a new set of lightning rods was installed which protrude above the apex by about one foot (0.3 m).) It is the third tallest monumental column in the world, trailing only the Juche Tower in Pyongyang, and the San Jacinto Monument in Houston, Texas. (Note: Only two other monumental columns honoring a person or thing have heights comparable to that of the Washington Monument: the San Jacinto Monument in Deer Park, Texas, and the Juche Tower in Pyongyang, North Korea. Which of the three is tallest depends on how its height is measured. A traditional method is above a part of the monument comparable to ground level. A more recent method is that used by the Council on Tall Buildings and Urban Habitat (CTBUH), the arbiter of the height of tall buildings since 1969. CTBUH states the height of a building must be measured above the "level of the lowest, significant, open-air, pedestrian entrance". Under this measurement, the Washington Monument is the tallest, followed by the San Jacinto Monument at −2.6 feet (−0.79 m) and the Juche Tower at −20 feet (−6 m). The above-ground heights of the three monumental columns from tallest to shortest are the San Jacinto Monument (+12.70 feet (3.871 m)), the Juche Tower (3.3 feet (+1 m)), and the Washington Monument. Height differences are relative to the height of the Washington Monument.: The Washington Monument's CTBUH (above pedestrian entrance) height, 554 feet 7 11/32 inches (169.046 m), is the same as its above ground height.; The San Jacinto Monument has a surveyed height of 567.31 feet (172.916 m) from its footing to the top of its beacon. However, the architect of the monument, Albert C. Finn, stated, "San Jacinto ... is actually 552 feet [168.2 m] from the first floor to the top of the beacon" ... in the "customary way" of measuring such things. The "first floor" is the CTBUH criterion. A stepped terrace elevates this pedestrian entrance above ground, thus reducing the monument's remaining height by its thickness, about 15.5 feet (4.7 m), to the monument's CTBUH height. The monument is made of reinforced concrete, not stone, although it has a facade of limestone.; The Juche Tower has a specified height of 558 feet (170 m) above a very large concrete bus parking lot just east of the tower. A stepped terrace elevates its pedestrian entrance, also on its east side, above this ground level. Its thickness, 23 feet (7 m), reduces the remaining height of the tower to 535 feet (163 m), its CTBUH height. The tower is made of reinforced concrete, not stone, although it has a facade of granite. A metal cage holding many panels of red glass in the shape of a flame, internally illuminated, surmounting a gold-colored "fuel chamber", occupies its top 66 feet (20 m).) It was the world's tallest structure between 1884 and 1889, after which it was overtaken by the Eiffel Tower, in Paris.

Construction of the presidential memorial began in 1848. The construction was suspended from 1854 to 1877 due to funding challenges, a struggle for control over the Washington National Monument Society, and the American Civil War. The stone structure was completed in 1884, and the internal ironwork, the knoll, and installation of memorial stones was completed in 1888. The original design was by Robert Mills from South Carolina, but construction omitted his proposed colonnade for lack of funds, and construction proceeded instead with a bare obelisk. The completed monument was dedicated on February 21, 1885, and opened to the public on October 9, 1888. In 2001, a temporary security screening facility was added to the entrance. Following the 2011 Virginia earthquake, the monument was closed for repairs until 2014, and it was closed again from 2016 to 2019.

The Washington Monument is a hollow Egyptian-style stone obelisk with a 500-foot-tall (152.4 m) column surmounted by a 55-foot-tall (16.8 m) pyramidion. The walls taper as they rise and are supported by six arches; the top of the pyramidion is a large, marble capstone with a small aluminum pyramid at its apex, with inscriptions on all four sides. The interior is occupied by iron stairs that spiral up the walls, with an elevator in the center. The pyramidion has eight observation windows and eight red aircraft warning lights, two per side. At the northeast corner of the foundation is a marble cornerstone, including a zinc case filled with memorabilia. Fifty U.S. flags fly on a large circle of poles centered on the monument, representing each U.S. state.

== History ==
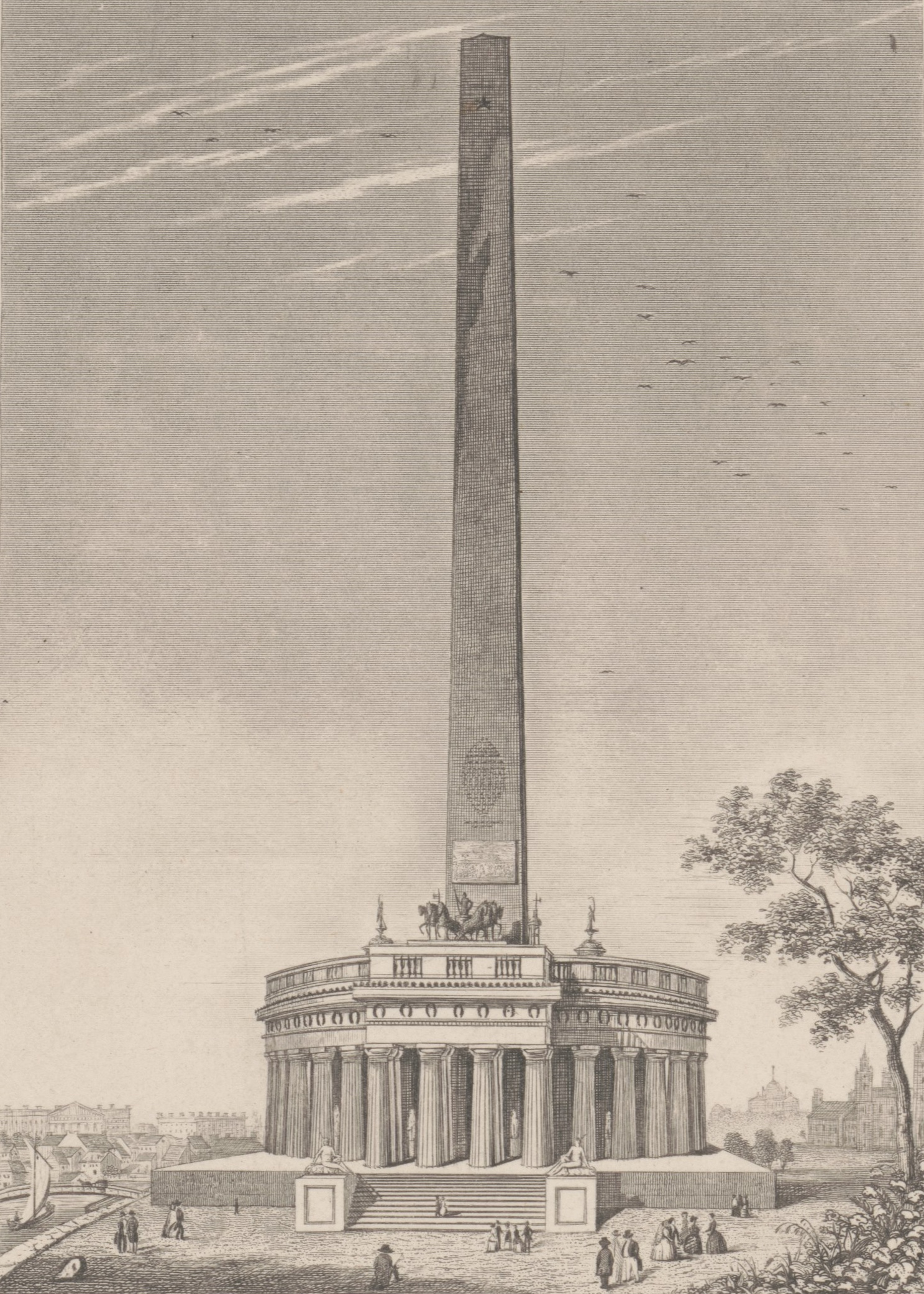
Print of the proposed Washington Monument by architect Robert Mills, c. 1845–1848

The monument was built to honor George Washington, the first president of the United States. At Washington's death in 1799, he was the unchallenged public icon of U.S. military and civic patriotism. He was also identified with the Federalist Party, which lost control of the national government in 1800 to the Jeffersonian Republicans, who were reluctant to celebrate the hero of the opposition party.

=== Proposals ===
After the American Revolutionary War, there were many proposals to build a monument to Washington, beginning with an authorization in 1783 by the old Confederation Congress to erect an equestrian statue of the general in a future U.S. national capital city. The initial proposal called for an equestrian statue.

On December 24, 1799, ten days after Washington's death, a U.S. congressional committee recommended a different type of monument. U.S. representative John Marshall proposed that a tomb be erected within the Capitol, but a lack of funds, disagreement over what type of memorial to build, and the Washington family's reluctance to move his body from Mount Vernon prevented progress on any project. The Democratic-Republican Party (Jeffersonian Republicans) took control of Congress in 1801 and rescinded prior approvals for the memorial. Further political squabbling, along with the American Civil War, blocked the completion of the Washington Monument for much of the 19th century.

=== Design ===
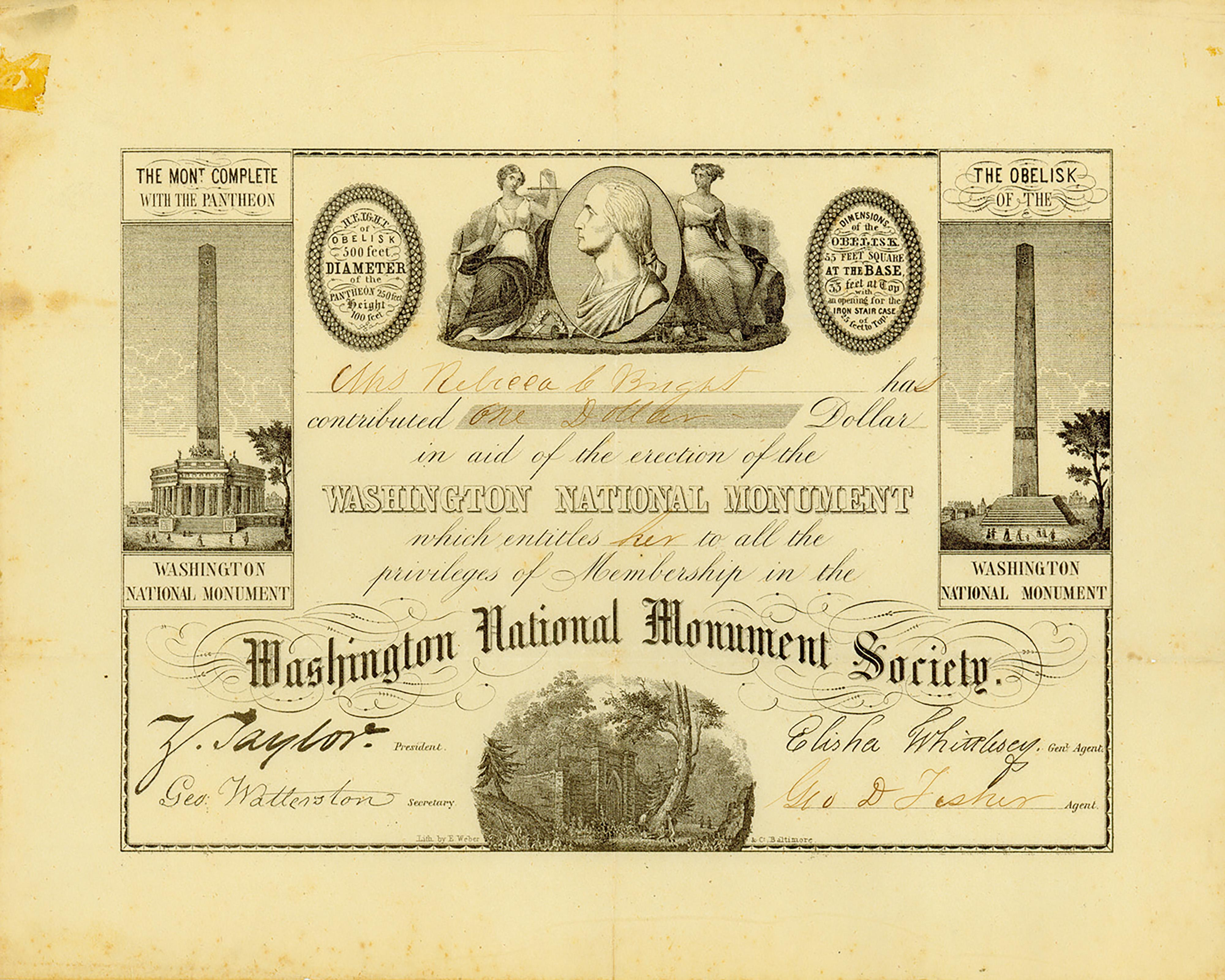
Donation receipt of the Washington National Monument Society

Progress toward a memorial finally began in 1833, when a group of citizens formed the Washington National Monument Society. On September 23, 1835, the board of managers of the society described their expectations:

It is proposed that the contemplated monument shall be like him in whose honor it is to be constructed, unparalleled in the world, and commensurate with the gratitude, liberality, and patriotism of the people by whom it is to be erected ... [It] should blend stupendousness with elegance, and be of such magnitude and beauty as to be an object of pride to the American people, and of admiration to all who see it. Its material is intended to be wholly American, and to be of marble and granite brought from each state, that each state may participate in the glory of contributing material as well as in funds to its construction.

In 1836, after they had raised $28,000 in donations (equivalent to $1,000,000 in 2025), they announced a competition for the design of the memorial. Robert Mills was formally selected in 1845. Mills had previously designed a monument to George Washington in nearby Baltimore in 1815, and he had just been chosen Architect of Public Buildings for Washington. His design called for a circular colonnaded building 250 feet (76 m) in diameter and 100 feet (30 m) high, supporting a four-sided obelisk 500 feet (150 m) high, for a total height of 600 feet (180 m). A massive cylindrical pillar 70 feet (21 m) in diameter would support the obelisk at the center of the building. The obelisk was to be 70 feet (21 m) square (Note: The base of the obelisk atop the circular pillar was to have been "70 feet square" (21 m square) according to the House report of 1872 and Torres (1984), but only "50 feet square" (15 m square) according to Harvey (1903). The corners of a 70 foot (21 m) square base (99 foot (30 m) diagonal) would dangerously overhang a 70 foot (21 m) diameter pillar, whereas a 50 foot (15 m) square base (71 foot (22 m) diagonal) would not.) at the base and 40 feet (12 m) square at the top with a slightly peaked roof. Both the obelisk and pillar were hollow within which a railway spiraled up. The obelisk had no doorway—instead its interior was entered from the interior of the pillar upon which it was mounted. The pillar had an "arched way" at its base. The top of the portico of the building would feature Washington standing in a chariot holding the reins of six horses. Inside the colonnade would be statues of 30 prominent Revolutionary War heroes and statues of the 56 signers of the Declaration of Independence.

Criticism of Mills's design came up already in 1847, when architect Henry Robinson Searle from Rochester presented an alternative concept, backed by three objections against Mills's project:

First, would the foundation sustain the weight of the required height, and especially with the increased localized pressure in a storm of wind; second, the mere obelisk appeared only as an enlarged plagiarism, in no way illustrating the memory of Washington personally, or those connected with him, or the history of this growing country; third, there is nothing whatever aesthetic about it, and nothing that would impress the visitor, whether native or foreign, with the grandeur of the work of Washington and his coadjutors in founding this nation.

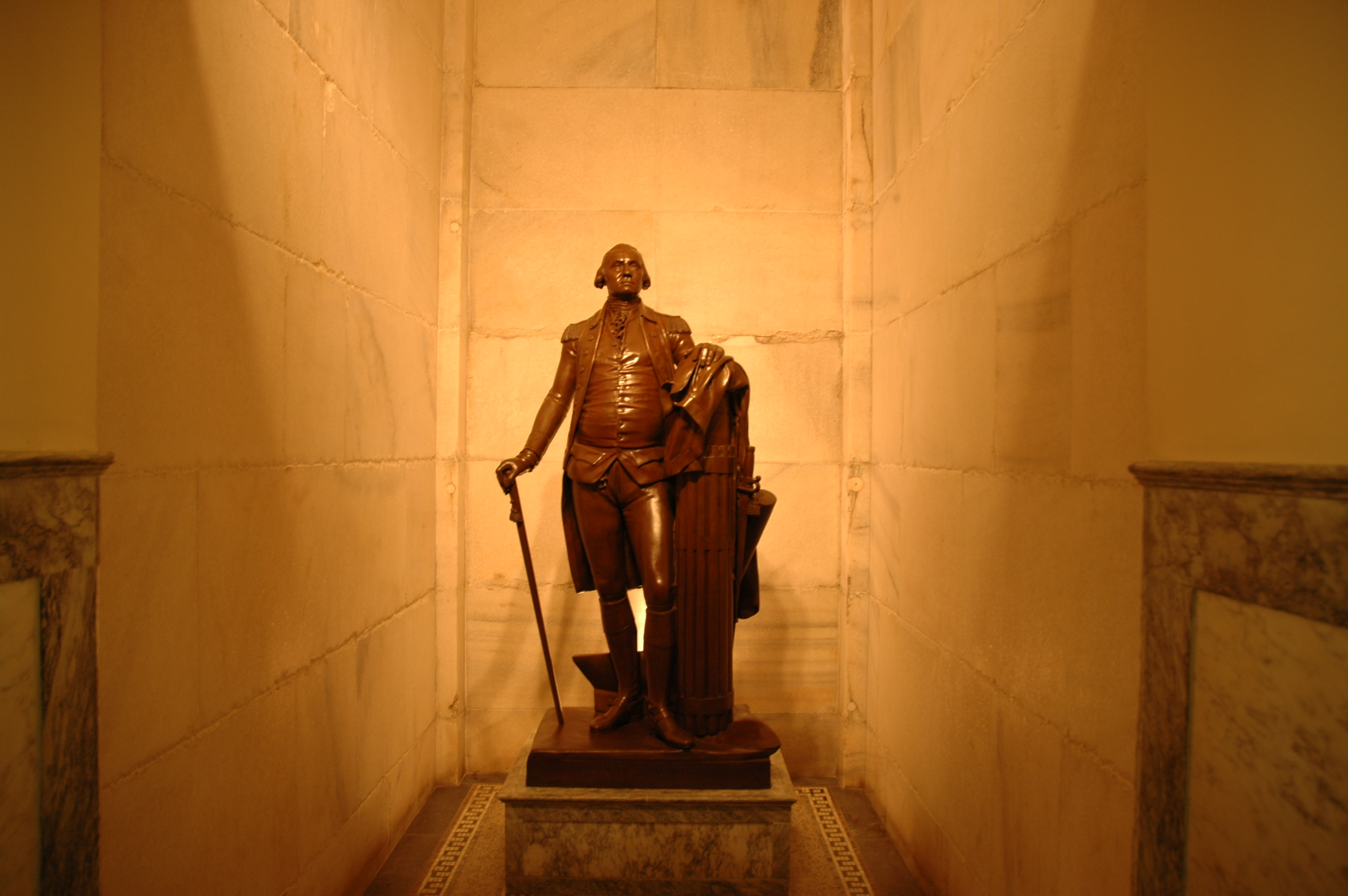
Bronze statue of George Washington in the monument's western alcove

Moreover, the estimated price tag of more than $1 million (equivalent to $30,000,000 in 2025) caused the society to hesitate. On April 11, 1848, the society decided, due to a lack of funds, to build only a simple plain obelisk. Mills's 1848 obelisk was to be 500 feet (150 m) tall, 55 feet (17 m) square at the base and 35 feet (11 m) square at the top. It had two massive doorways, each 15 feet (4.6 m) high and 6 feet (1.8 m) wide, on the east and west sides of its base. Surrounding each doorway were raised jambs, a heavy pediment, and entablature within which was carved an Egyptian-style winged sun and asps. This original design conformed to a massive temple which was to have surrounded the base of the obelisk, but because it was never built, the architect of the second phase of construction Thomas Lincoln Casey smoothed down the projecting jambs, pediment and entablature in 1885, walled up the west entrance with marble forming an alcove, and reduced the east entrance to 8 feet (2.4 m) high. A statue of Washington was eventually placed in the alcove in 1994.

=== Construction ===
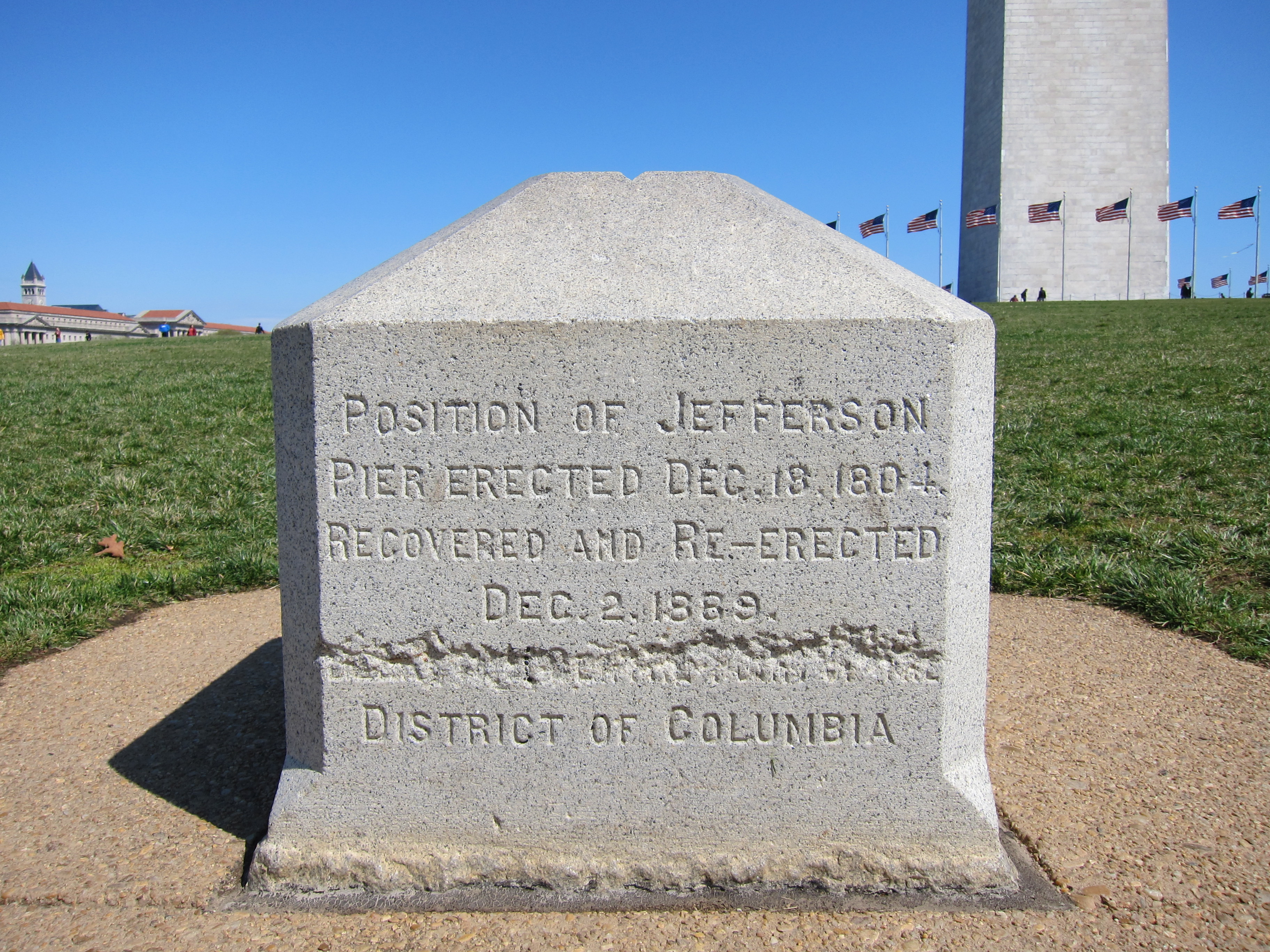
The west side of Jefferson Pier with the Washington Monument (in background)

The Washington Monument was originally intended to be located at the intersection of a north–south axis through the center of the White House, and a west–east axis through the U.S. Capitol on Capitol Hill. This site had been allocated as part of the 1791 L'Enfant Plan for Washington, D.C. (Note: L'Enfant identified himself as "Peter Charles L'Enfant" during most of his life, while residing in the United States. He wrote this name on his "Plan of the city intended for the permanent seat of the government of t(he) United States ..." and on other legal documents. However, during the early 1900s, the then French ambassador to the U.S., Jean Jules Jusserand, popularized the use of L'Enfant's birth name, "Pierre Charles L'Enfant". The National Park Service identifies L'Enfant as "Major Peter Charles L'Enfant" and as "Major Pierre (Peter) Charles L'Enfant" on pages of its website that describe the Washington Monument. The United States Code states in 40 U.S.C. § 3309: "(a) In General. – The purposes of this chapter shall be carried out in the District of Columbia as nearly as may be practicable in harmony with the plan of Peter Charles L'Enfant.") The ground at the intended location proved to be too unstable to support such a heavy structure, so the monument's location was moved 390 feet (118.9 m) east-southeast. (Note: The monument is located 370 feet (112.78 m) east of the north–south White House axis, 123 feet (37.49 m) south of the east–west Capitol axis, and 7,387.4 feet (2,251.68 m) west of the north–south Capitol axis.) At that originally intended site there now stands a small monolith called the Jefferson Pier. Consequently, the McMillan Plan specified that the Lincoln Memorial should be "placed on the main axis of the Capitol and the Monument", about 1° south of due west of the Capitol or the monument, not due west of the Capitol or the monument. (Note: The park portion of the Mall, including Madison Drive, Jefferson Drive, and four wide gravel boulevards between them east of the monument, and the Reflecting Pool and sidewalks west of the monument, are parallel to the offset Capitol-Monument-Lincoln axis. But the major highways immediately north and south of the Mall, Constitution Avenue and Independence Avenue, are oriented east–west. This misalignment can be seen on a map of the area.)

==== Excavation and initial construction ====
The cornerstone was laid with great ceremony on July 4, 1848. The ceremony began with a parade of dignitaries in carriages, marching troops, fire companies, and benevolent societies. A long oration was delivered by Robert C. Winthrop, the speaker of the House of Representatives. Subsequently, workers excavated the site, laid the cornerstone on the prepared bed, and laid the original foundation around and on top of the cornerstone. Construction of its massive walls began in 1849. Regarding modern claims of slave labor being used in construction, Washington Monument historian John Steele Gordon stated "I can't say for certain, but the stonemasonry was pretty highly skilled, so it's unlikely that slaves would've been doing it. The stones were cut by stonecutters, which is highly skilled work; and the stones were hoisted by means of steam engines, so you'd need a skilled engineer and foreman for stuff like that. Tending the steam engine, building the cast-iron staircase inside—that wasn't grunt work. ... The early quarries were in Maryland, so slave labor was undoubtedly used to quarry and haul the stone". Abraham Riesman, who quoted Gordon, states "there were plenty of people who worked as skilled laborers while enslaved in antebellum America. Indeed, there were enslaved people who worked as stonemasons. So the possibility remains that there were slaves who performed some of the necessary skilled labor for the monument." According to historian Jesse Holland, it is very likely that African American slaves were among the construction workers, given that slavery prevailed in Washington and its surrounding states at that time, and slaves were commonly used in public and private construction.

During the second phase, it is unlikely that slave labor was used, as every stone laid required dressing and polishing by a skilled stonemason. This includes the iron staircase which was constructed 1885–86. That the stonecutters in the quarry were slaves is confirmed because all quarry workers were slaves during the construction of the United States Capitol during the 1790s. However, most of the first phase's construction only required unskilled manual labor. No information survives concerning the method used to lift stones that weighed several tons each during the first phase, whether by a manual winch or a steam engine. The surviving information concerning slaves that built the core of the United States Capitol during the 1790s is not much help. At the time, the District of Columbia outside of Georgetown was sparsely populated so the federal government rented slaves from their owners who were paid a fee for their slaves' normal daily labor. Any overtime for Sundays, holidays, and nights was paid directly to the slaves which they could use for daily needs or to save to buy their freedom. Conversely, the first phase of the monument was constructed by a private entity, the Washington National Monument Society.

Only a small number of stones used in the first phase required a skilled stonemason. These were the marble blocks on the outer surface of the monument (their inner surfaces were left very rough) and those gneiss stones that form the rough inner walls of the monument (all other surfaces of those inner stones within the walls were left jagged). The vast majority of all gneiss stones laid during the first phase, those between the outer and inner surfaces of the walls, from very large to very small jagged stones, form a pile of rubble held together by a large amount of mortar. The original foundation below the walls was made of layered gneiss rubble, but without the massive stones used within the walls. Most of the gneiss stones used during the first phase were obtained from quarries in the upper Potomac River Valley. Almost all the marble stones of the first and second phases was Cockeysville Marble, obtained from quarries north of downtown Baltimore in rural Baltimore County where stone for their first Washington Monument was obtained.

On Independence Day, July 4, 1848, the Freemasons, the same organization to which Washington belonged, laid the cornerstone (symbolically, not physically). According to Joseph R. Chandler:

No more Washingtons shall come in our time ... But his virtues are stamped on the heart of mankind. He who is great in the battlefield looks upward to the generalship of Washington. He who grows wise in counsel feels that he is imitating Washington. He who can resign power against the wishes of a people, has in his eye the bright example of Washington.

Two years later, on July 4, 1850, George Washington Parke Custis, the adopted son of George Washington, dedicated a stone from the people of the District of Columbia to the Monument at a ceremony.

==== Donations run out ====
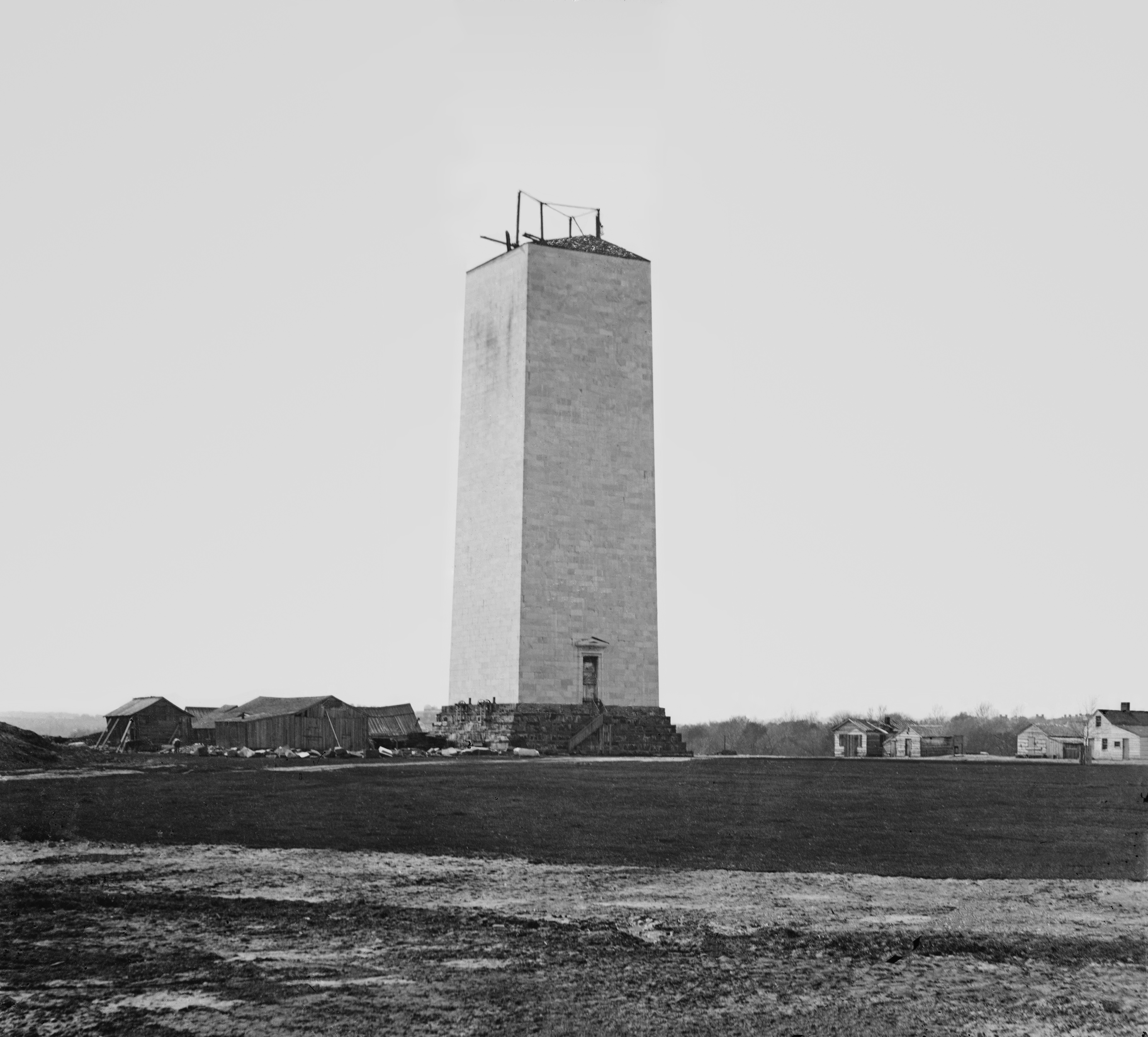
The partially completed monument, photographed by Mathew Brady, c. 1860

Construction continued until 1854, when donations ran out and the monument had reached a height of 152 feet (46.3 m). At that time a memorial stone that was contributed by Pope Pius IX, called the Pope's Stone, was destroyed by members of the anti-Catholic, nativist American Party, better known as the "Know-Nothings", during the early morning hours of March 6, 1854 (a priest replaced it in 1982 using the Latin phrase "A Roma Americae" instead of the original stone's English phrase "Rome to America"). Economic and political conditions of the time caused public contributions to the Washington National Monument Society to cease, so they appealed to Congress for money.

The request had just reached the floor of the House of Representatives when the Know-Nothing Party seized control of the society on February 22, 1855, a year after construction funds ran out. Congress immediately tabled its expected contribution of $200,000 to the society, effectively halting the Federal appropriation. During its tenure, the Know-Nothing Society added only two courses of masonry, or 4 feet (1.2 m), to the monument using rejected masonry it found on site, increasing the height of the shaft to 156 feet (48 m). The original society refused to recognize the takeover, so the two rival societies existed side by side until 1858. With the Know-Nothing Party disintegrating and unable to secure contributions for the monument, it surrendered its possession of the monument to the original society three and a half years later on October 20, 1858. To prevent future takeovers, the U.S. Congress incorporated the society on February 22, 1859, with a stated charter and set of rules and procedures.

==== Post–Civil War ====
The American Civil War (1861–1865) halted all work on the monument, but interest grew after the war's end. Engineers studied the foundation several times to determine if it was strong enough for continued construction after 20 years of effective inactivity. In 1876, the American Centennial of the Declaration of Independence, Congress agreed to appropriate another $200,000 to resume construction.

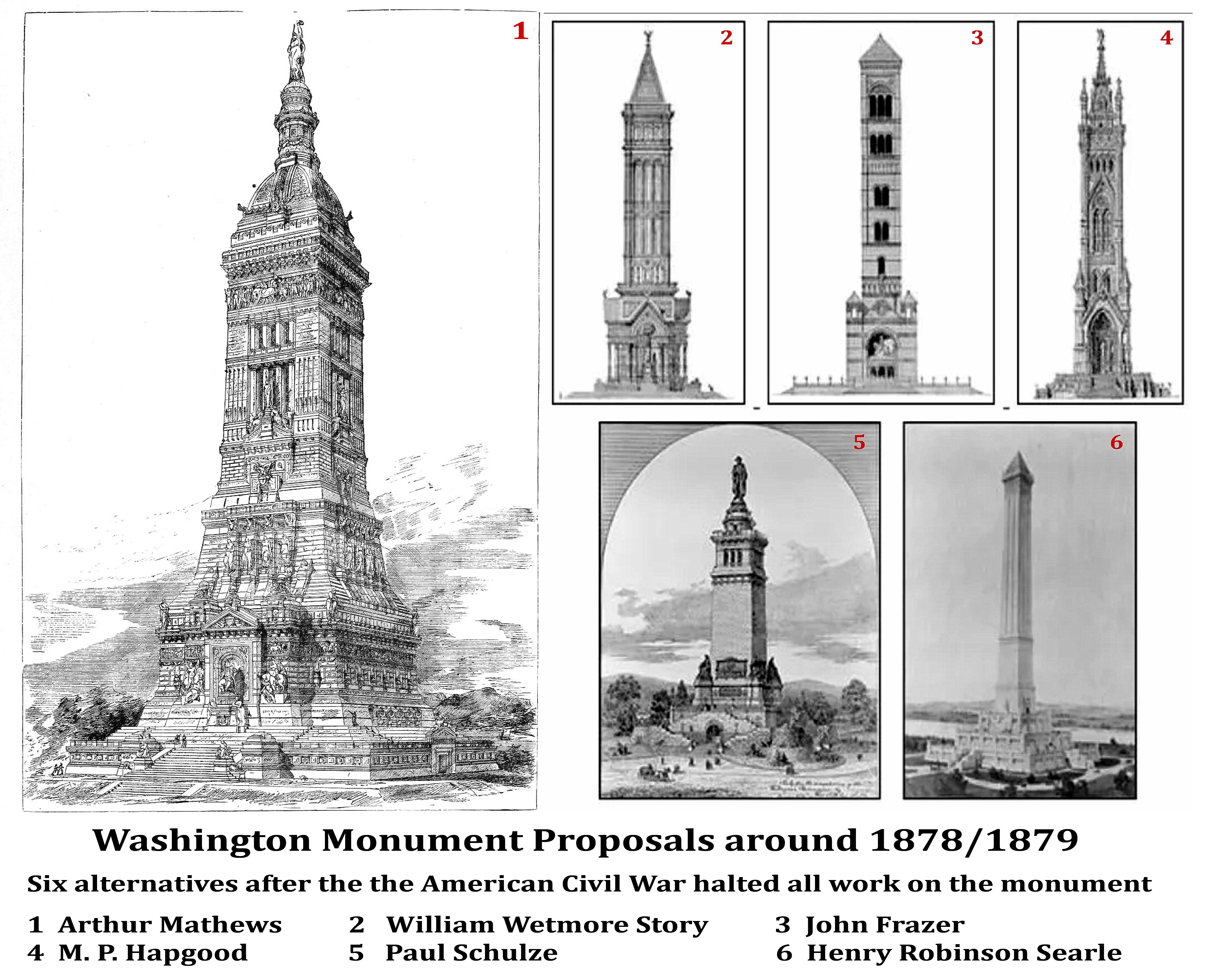
Proposals for the completion of the monument published in 1879. Number 6, Henry R. Searle's obelisk was already made public in 1847.

Before work could begin again, arguments about the most appropriate design resumed. Many people thought a simple obelisk, one without the colonnade, would be too bare. Architect Mills was reputed to have said omitting the colonnade would make the monument look like "a stalk of asparagus"; another critic said it offered "little ... to be proud of".

This attitude led people to submit alternative designs. Both the Washington National Monument Society and Congress held discussions about how the monument should be finished. The society considered five new designs and an anonymous "interesting project of California" (which later turned out to be by Arthur Frank Mathews), concluding that the one by William Wetmore Story, seemed "vastly superior in artistic taste and beauty". Congress deliberated over those five proposals (among others by Paul Schulze and John Fraser) as well as Mills's original. While it was deciding, it ordered work on the obelisk to continue. Finally, the members of the society agreed to abandon the colonnade and alter the obelisk so it conformed to classical Egyptian proportions.

==== Resumption ====
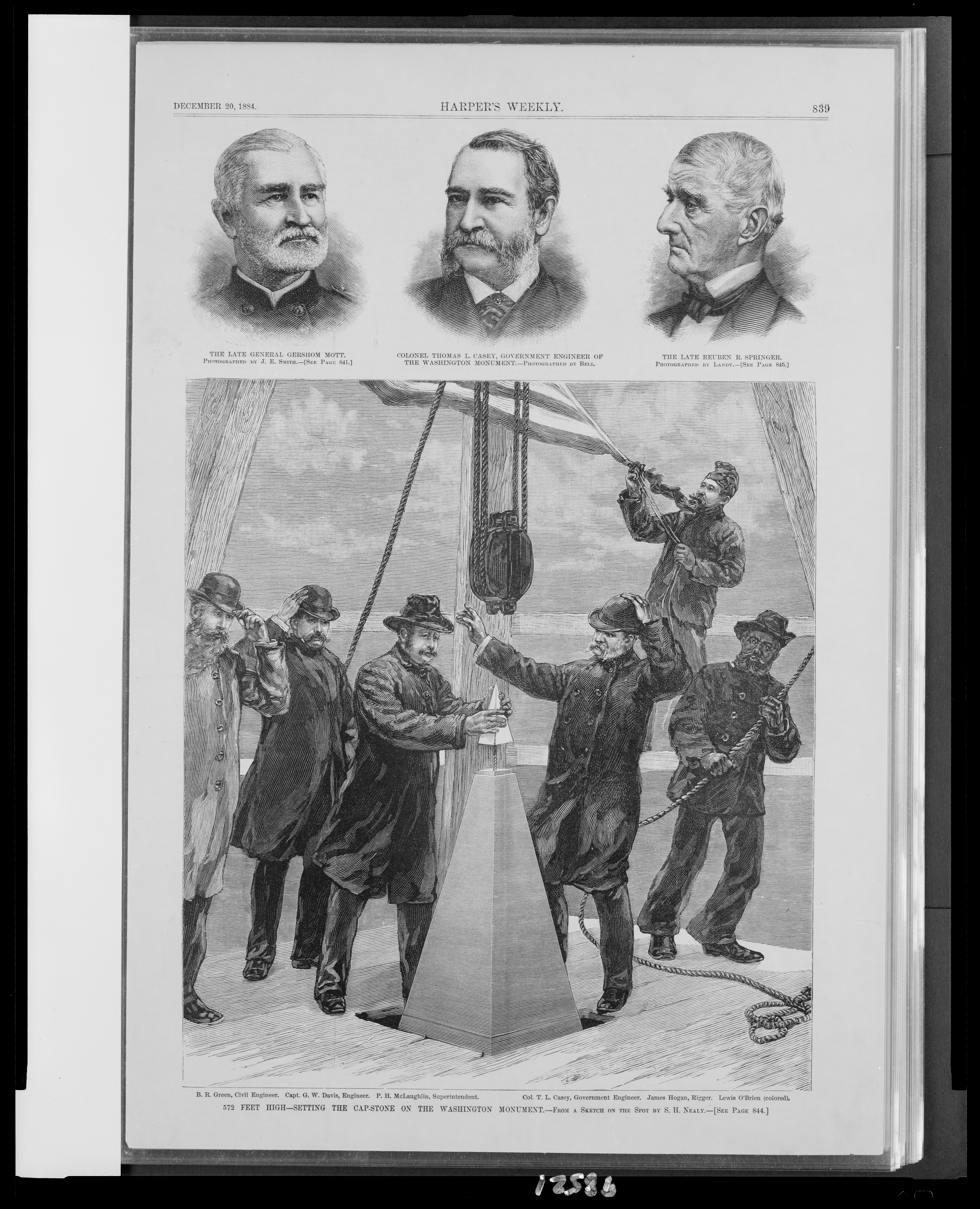
P. H. McLaughlin setting the aluminum apex with Thomas Lincoln Casey (hands up)

Construction resumed in 1879 under the direction of Lieutenant Colonel Thomas Lincoln Casey of the United States Army Corps of Engineers. Casey redesigned the foundation, strengthening it so it could support a structure that ultimately weighed more than 40,000 tons (36,000 tonnes). The first stone atop the unfinished stump was laid on August 7, 1880, in a small ceremony attended by President Rutherford B. Hayes, Casey and a few others. Casey found 92 memorial stones ("presented stones") already inlaid into the interior walls of the first phase of construction. Before construction continued he temporarily removed eight stones at the 150-foot (46 m) level so that the walls at that level could be sloped outward, producing thinner second-phase walls. He inserted those stones and most of the remaining memorial stones stored in the lapidarium into the interior walls during 1885–1889. The bottom third of the monument is a slightly lighter shade than the rest of the construction because the marble was obtained from different quarries.

The building of the monument proceeded quickly after Congress had provided sufficient funding. In four years, it was completed, with the 100-ounce (2.83 kg) aluminum apex/lightning-rod being put in place on December 6, 1884. The apex was the largest single piece of aluminum cast at the time, when aluminum commanded a price comparable to silver. Two years later, the Hall–Héroult process made aluminum easier to produce and the price of aluminum plummeted, though it should have provided a lustrous, non-rusting apex. (Note: The large gold-plated copper band added to the aluminum apex in 1885 discolored or damaged the surface of the aluminum so much that most of its inscriptions are no longer legible – see Aluminum apex.) The monument opened to the public on October 9, 1888.

=== Dedication ===
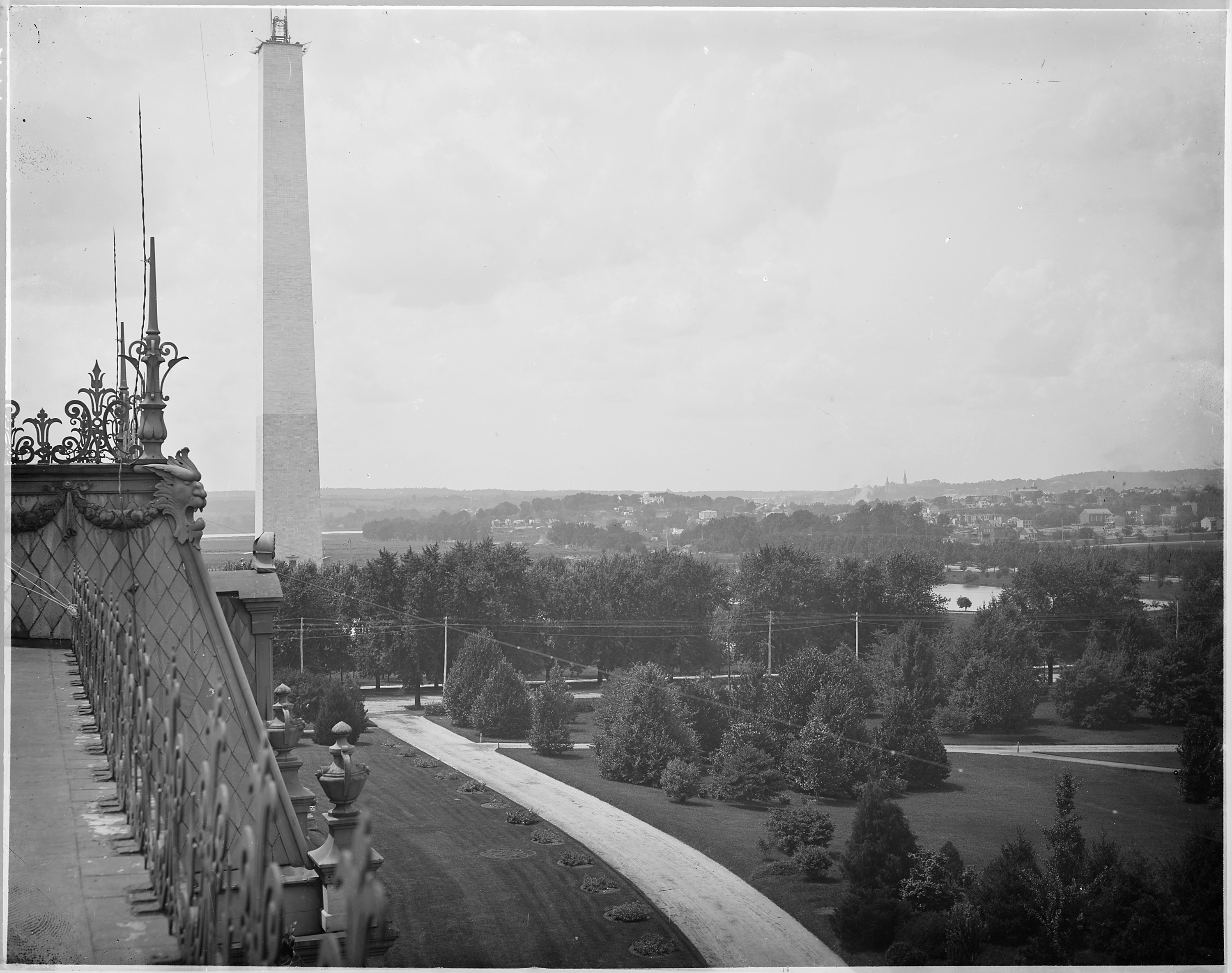
Washington Monument nears completion around 1884

The monument was dedicated on February 21, 1885. Over 800 people were present on the monument grounds to hear speeches by Ohio senator John Sherman, the Rev. Henderson Suter, William Wilson Corcoran of the Washington National Monument Society (read by James C. Welling), Freemason Myron M. Parker, Col. Thomas Lincoln Casey of the Army Corps of Engineers, and President Chester A. Arthur. President Arthur proclaimed:

I do now ... in behalf of the people, receive this monument ... and declare it dedicated from this time forth to the immortal name and memory of George Washington.

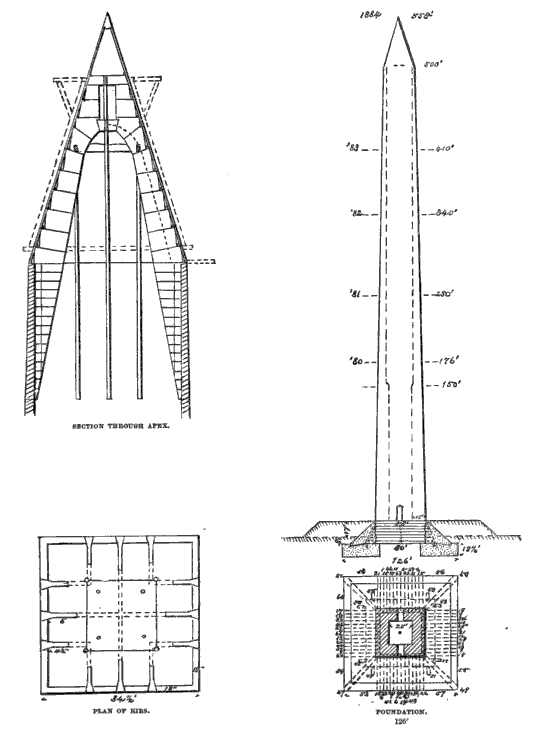
Monument plans and timeline of construction

After the speeches, Lieutenant-General Philip Sheridan led a procession past the White House, via Pennsylvania Avenue to the east main entrance of the Capitol Building, where U.S. representative John Davis Long read a speech written a few months earlier by Robert C. Winthrop. A final speech was given by U.S. senator John W. Daniel. The festivities concluded that evening with fireworks, both aerial and ground displays. The total cost of the monument from 1848 to 1888 was $1,409,500 (equivalent to $40,000,000 in 2025).

=== Later history ===
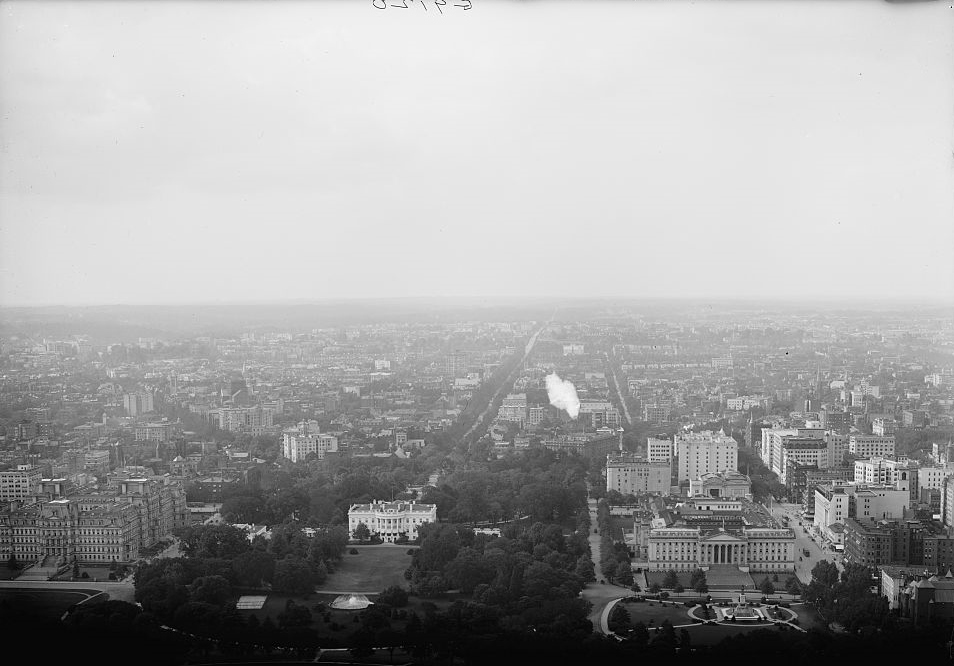
View of the White House and Northern Washington from the top of the Washington Monument in the early 1900s

The Washington Monument was the world's tallest structure until the Eiffel Tower in Paris was completed in 1889. This monument is taller than the obelisks around the capitals of Europe and in Egypt and Ethiopia, but ordinary antique obelisks were quarried as a monolithic block of stone, and were therefore seldom taller than approximately 100 feet (30 m). The district's Heights of Buildings Act of 1910 restricts new building heights to no more than 20 feet (6.1 m) greater than the width of the adjacent street; as such, none of Washington, D.C.'s tallest buildings are higher than the Washington Monument.

==== 20th century ====
In the early 1900s, material started oozing out between the outer stones of the first construction period below the 150-foot (46 m) mark, and was referred to by tourists as "geological tuberculosis". This was caused by the weathering of the cement and rubble filler between the outer and inner walls. As the lower section of the monument was exposed to cold and hot and damp and dry weather conditions, the material dissolved and worked its way through the cracks between the stones of the outer wall, solidifying as it dripped down their outer surface.

For ten hours in December 1982, the Washington Monument and eight tourists were held hostage by a nuclear arms protester, Norman Mayer, claiming to have explosives in a van he drove to the monument's base. United States Park Police shot and killed Mayer. The monument was undamaged in the incident, and it was discovered later that Mayer did not have explosives. After this incident, the surrounding grounds were modified in places to restrict the possible unauthorized approach of motor vehicles.

==== 1990s and 2000s renovations ====
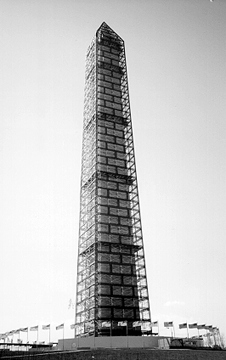
The monument undergoing restoration in 1999

The monument underwent an extensive restoration project between 1998 and 2001. During this time it was completely covered in scaffolding designed by Michael Graves (who was also responsible for the interior changes). The project included cleaning, repairing and repointing the monument's exterior and interior stonework; adding glass encasements around stone in publicly accessible interior spaces to prevent vandalism; and adding windows with narrower frames to increase the viewing space. New exhibits celebrating the life of George Washington, and the monument's place in history, were also added.

A temporary interactive visitor center, dubbed the "Discovery Channel Center", was also constructed during the project. The center provided a simulated ride to the top of the monument, and shared information with visitors during phases in which the monument was closed. The majority of the project's phases were completed by summer 2000, allowing the monument to reopen July 31, 2000. The monument temporarily closed again on December 4, 2000, to allow a new elevator cab to be installed, completing the final phase of the restoration project. The new cab included glass windows, allowing visitors to see some of the 194 memorial stones with their inscriptions embedded in the monument's walls. The installation of the cab took much longer than anticipated, and the monument did not reopen until February 22, 2002. The final cost of the restoration project was $10.5 million.

On September 7, 2004, the monument closed for a $15 million renovation, which included numerous security upgrades and redesign of the monument grounds by landscape architect Laurie Olin (b. 1938). The renovations were due partly to security concerns following the September 11, 2001 attacks and the start of the war on terror. The monument reopened April 1, 2005, while the surrounding grounds remained closed until the landscape was finished later that summer.

==== 2010s to present ====
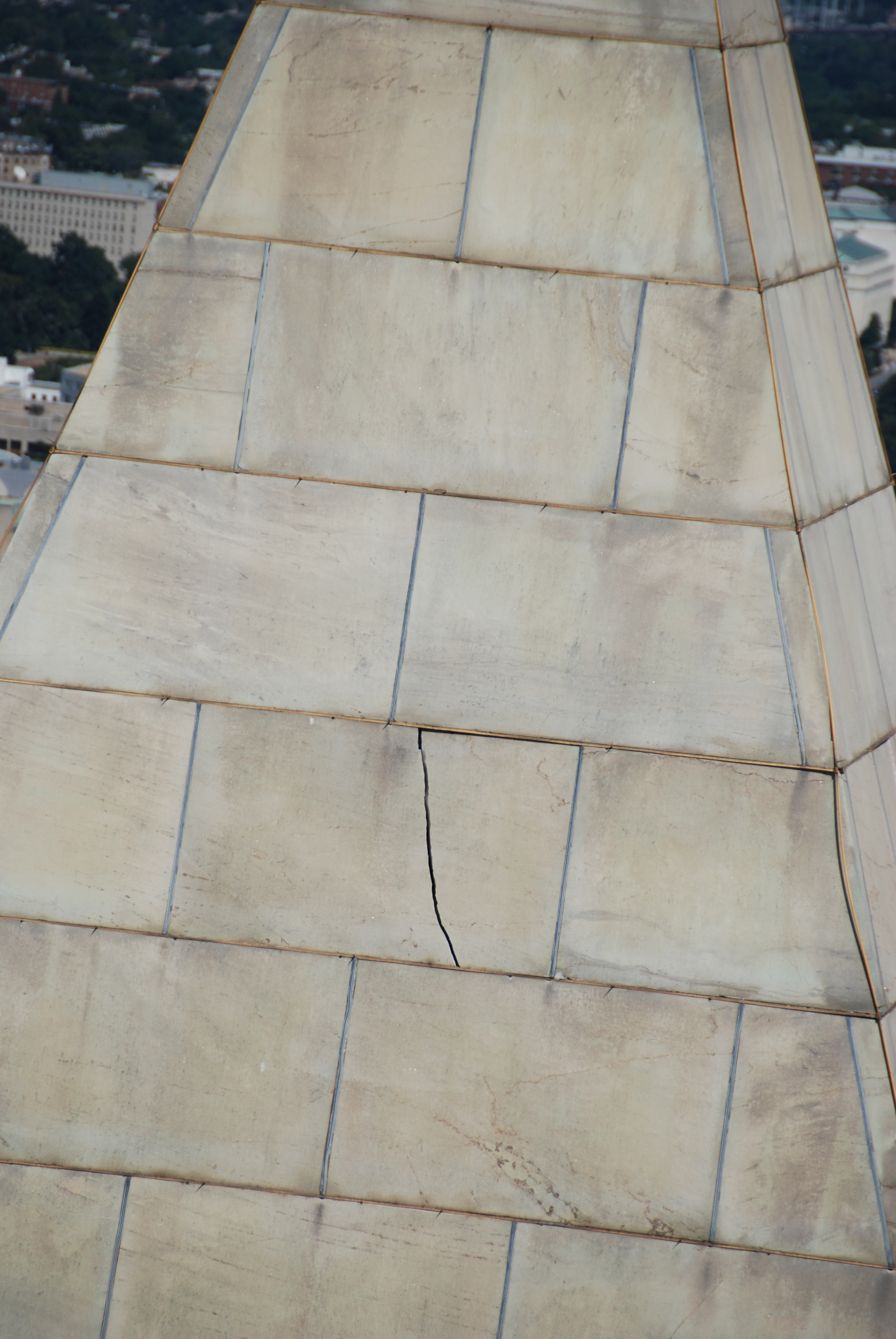
Crack in a stone at the top of the monument after the 2011 Virginia earthquake

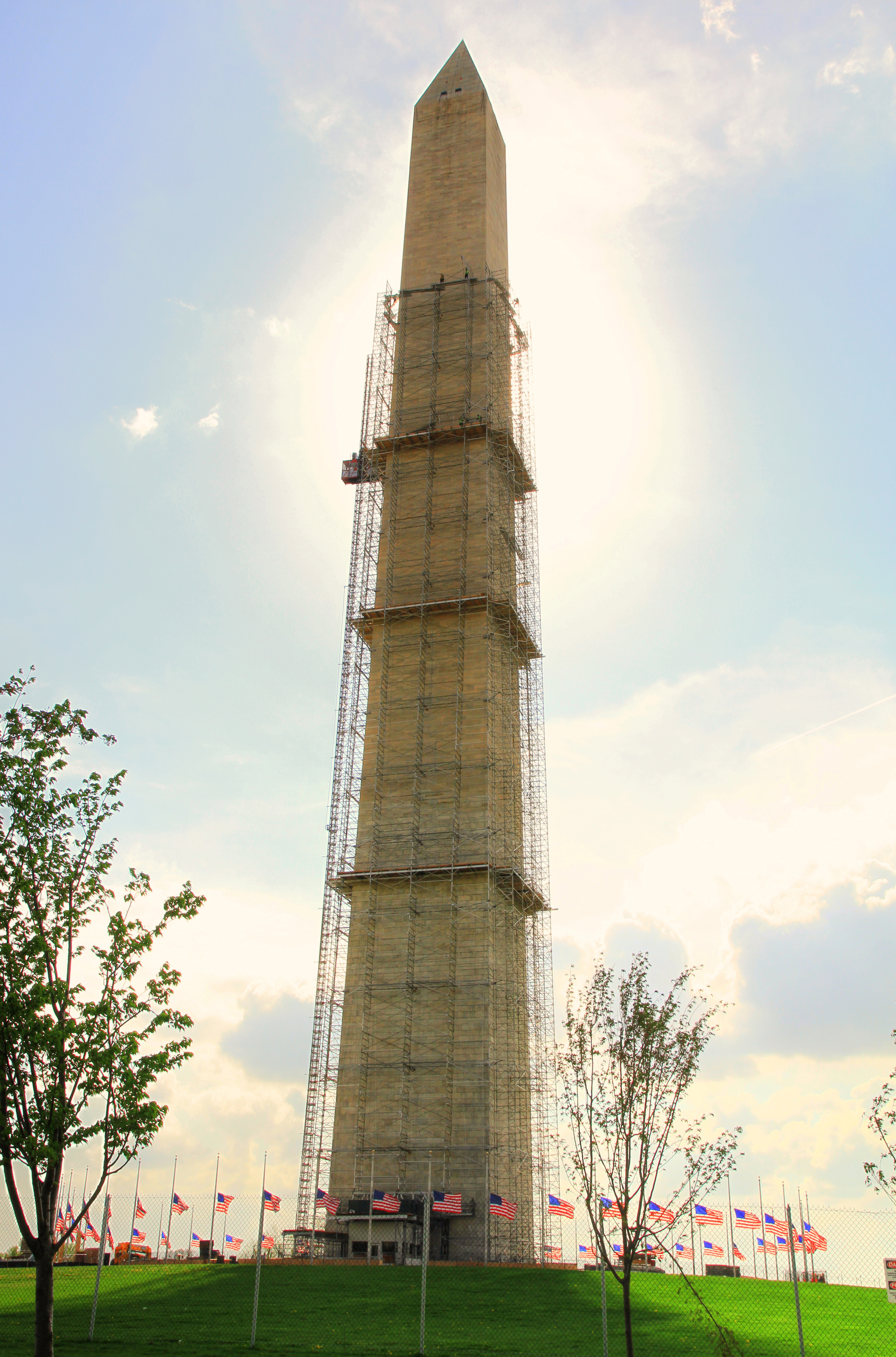
Repairs on the Washington Monument in 2013

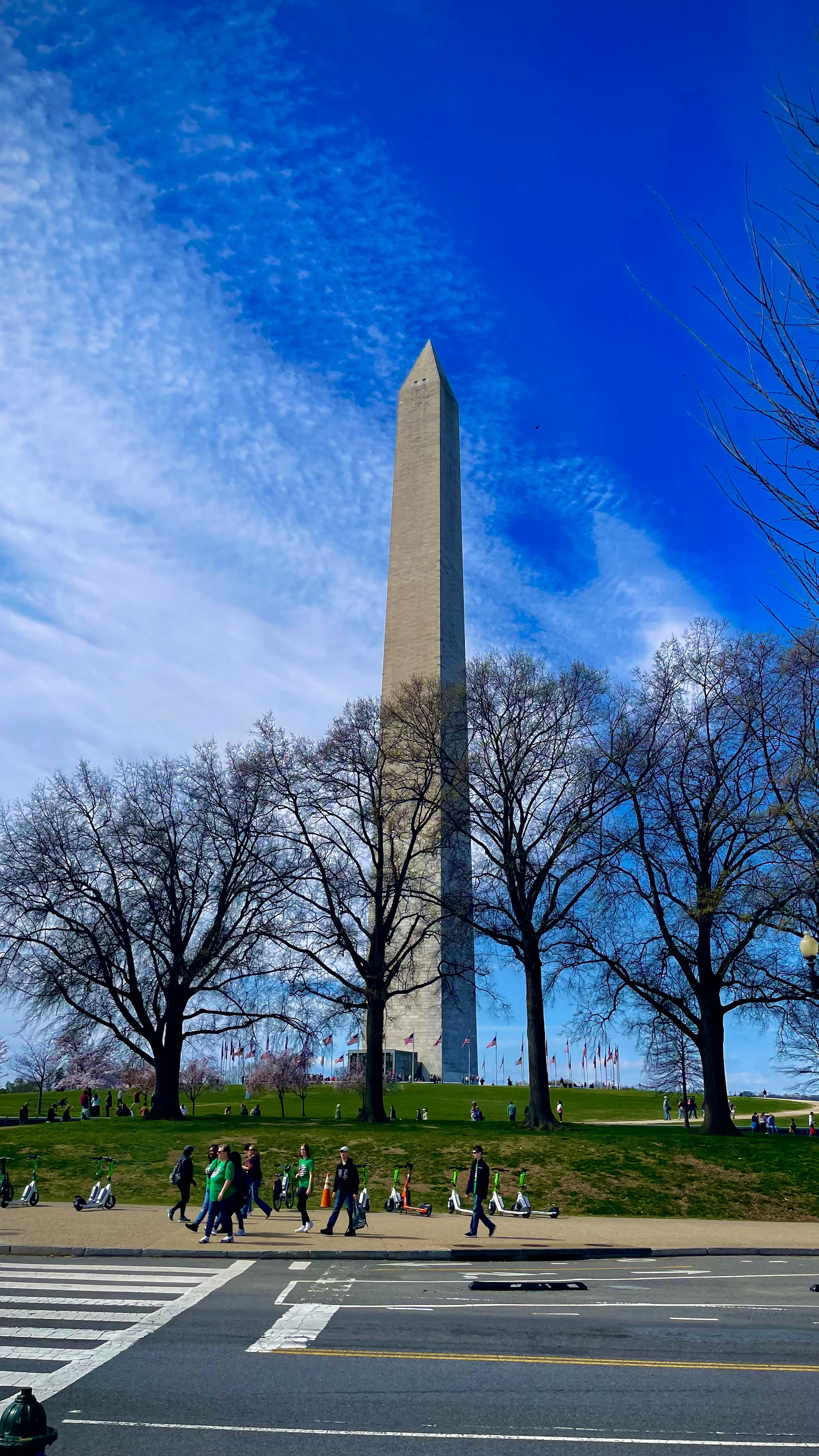
The monument in March 2024

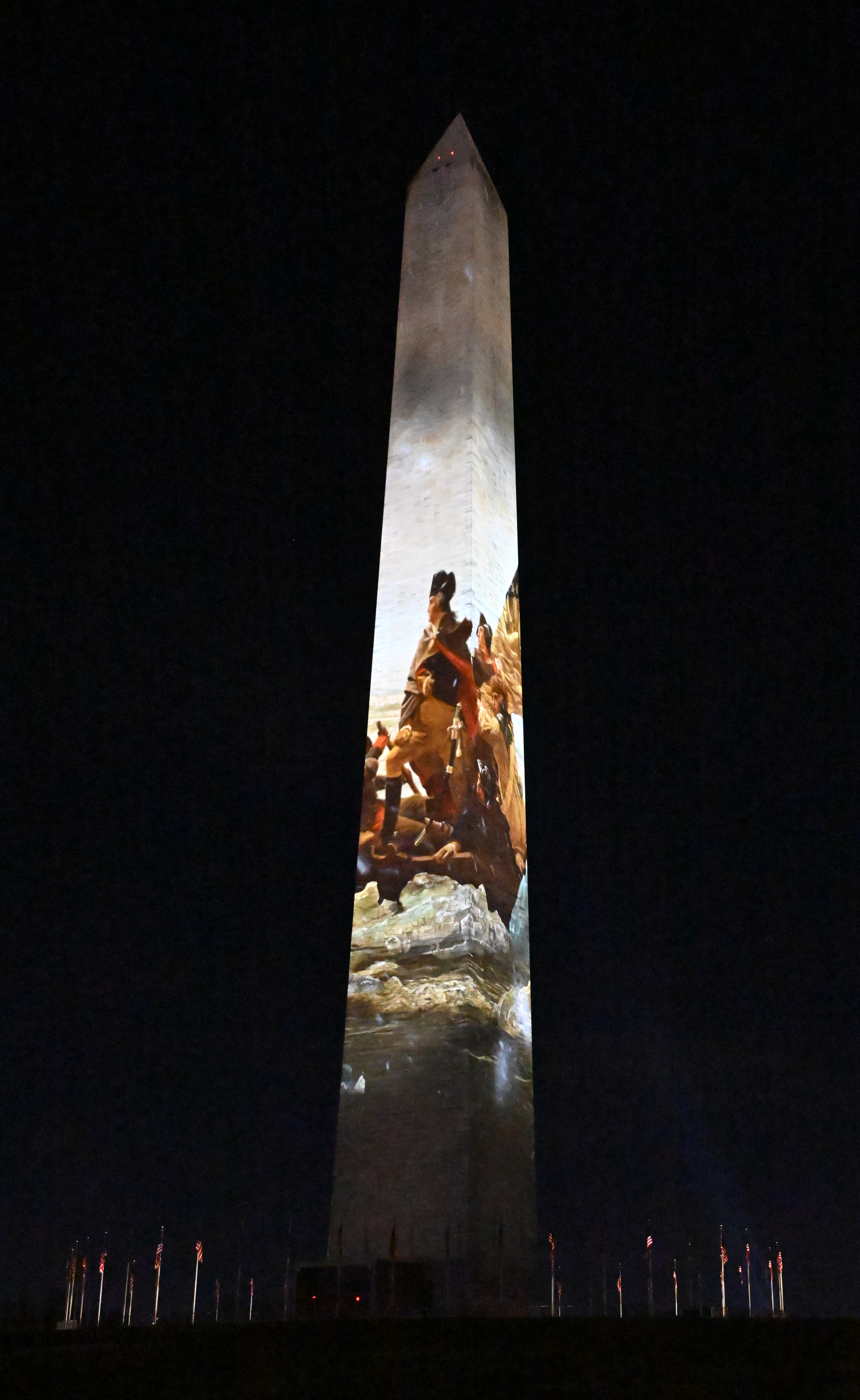
Washington Crossing the Delaware was projected on the Washington Monument in January 2026 during the United States Semiquincentennial celebrations.

On August 23, 2011, the Washington Monument sustained damage during the 5.8 magnitude 2011 Virginia earthquake. Over 150 cracks were found in the monument, which was closed indefinitely after a crack was found at the pinnacle. Other pieces of the monument became dislodged. Two structural engineering firms—Wiss, Janney, Elstner Associates, Inc. and Tipping Mar Associates—were hired to assess the monument. An examination of the monument's exterior revealed debris had become dislodged around and inside the memorial. The elevator system had been damaged operating only to the 250-foot (76 m) level, but was soon repaired. A group of climbers conducted further investigations that September because the NPS suspected that there were more cracks on the monument's upper section that were not visible from the inside. The external inspection found cracks and spalling near the top of the monument, and more loss of joint mortar further down the monument. The full report was issued in December 2011. More than $200,000 was spent between August 24 and September 26 inspecting the structure. Bob Vogel, Superintendent of the National Mall and Memorial Parks, emphasized that the monument was not in danger of collapse.

The NPS announced in 2012 that the monument would be closed for repairs until 2014, hiring Hill International and Louis Berger Group to provide coordination between the designer, Wiss, Janney, and Elstner Associates, the general contractor Perini, and numerous stakeholders. NPS said a portion of the plaza at the base of the monument would be removed and scaffolding constructed around the exterior. Some stone pieces saved during the 2011 inspection would be refastened to the monument, while "Dutchman patches" (Note: A "Dutchman Repair" "is a type of partial replacement or 'piecing-in'" that "involves replacing a small area of damaged stone" with a small piece of natural or imitation stone, "wedged in place or secured with an adhesive", with the joint being "as narrow as possible to maintain the appearance of a continuous surface".) would be used in other places. Several of the stone lips that help hold the pyramidion's exterior slabs in place were also damaged, so engineers installed stainless steel brackets to more securely fasten them to the monument. The National Park Service reopened the Washington Monument to visitors on May 12, 2014, eight days ahead of schedule. Repairs to the monument cost $15 million, with taxpayers funding $7.5 million of the cost and David Rubenstein funding the other $7.5 million.

The monument continued to be plagued by problems after the earthquake, including in January 2017 when the lights illuminating it went out. The monument was closed again in September 2016 due to reliability issues with the elevator system. On December 2, 2016, the PS announced that the monument would be closed until 2019 in order to modernize the elevator. The $2–3 million project was to correct the elevator's ongoing mechanical, electrical and computer issues, which had shuttered the monument since August 17. The NPS also requested funding for a permanent screening facility for the Washington Monument. The final months of closure were for mitigation of possibly contaminated underground soil thought to have been introduced in the 1880s. The monument reopened September 19, 2019.

The Washington Monument was closed on March 14, 2020, because of the COVID-19 pandemic. It reopened on October 1, 2020, and remained open through the remainder of that year, except for brief closures. On January 11, 2021, a few days after the January 6 United States Capitol attack, the National Park Service announced a two-week closure until after the presidential inauguration; despite a lack of violence, the closure was extended due to a revival of COVID-19 fears. The monument then reopened on July 14, 2021, only to close yet again on August 16 for two weeks due to lightning strikes which damaged some electrical systems.

As part of the United States Semiquincentennial celebrations leading in to 2026, a projection show ran for six nights starting on December 31, 2025. Stories about how America was discovered, its independence, and future were projected on the sides of the Washington Monument.

== Components ==
=== Foundation ===
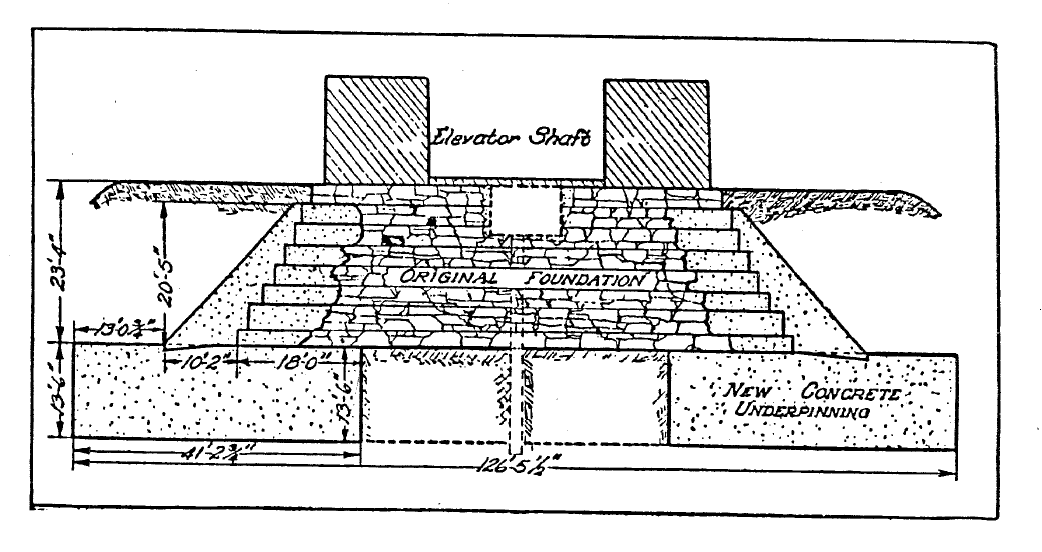
Cross section of foundation, both old and reinforced, showing dimensions

The first phase began with the excavation of about 7 feet 8 inches (2.3 m) of topsoil down to a level of loam, consisting of equal parts of sand and clay, hard enough to require picks to break it up. On this "bed of the foundation" the cornerstone was laid at the northeast corner of the proposed foundation. The rest of the foundation was then constructed of bluestone gneiss rubble and spalls, with every crevice filled with lime mortar. The dimensions of this old foundation were 23 feet 4 inches (7.1 m) high, 80 feet (24.4 m) square at the base, and 58 feet 6 inches (17.8 m) square at the top, laid down in eight steps, similar to a truncated step pyramid. At the center of the foundation a brick-lined 2-foot (60 cm) square well was dug to a depth of 20 feet (6 m) below the bed of the foundation to keep it dry and to supply water during construction.

During the second phase, after determining that the proposed weight of the monument was too great for the old foundation to safely bear, the thickness of the walls atop the unfinished stump was reduced and the foundation was strengthened by adding a large unreinforced concrete slab below the perimeter of the old foundation to increase the monument's load bearing area two and one half times. The slab was 13 feet 6 inches (4.1 m) thick, with an outer perimeter 126 feet 5 1/2 inches (38.54 m) square, an inner perimeter 44 feet (13.4 m) square, with undisturbed loam inside the inner perimeter except for the water well. The area at the base of the second phase foundation is 15,992 square feet (1,485.7 m^{2}). The strengthened foundation (old foundation and concrete slab) has a total depth of 36 feet 10 inches (11.2 m) below the bottom of the lowest course of marble blocks (now below ground), and 38 feet (11.6 m) below the entry lobby floor. Casey reported that nowhere did the load exceed 9 long tons per square foot (140 psi; 970 kPa) and did not exceed 3 long tons per square foot (47 psi; 320 kPa) near the outer perimeter. To properly distribute the load from the shaft to slab, about half by volume of the outer periphery of the old rubble foundation below its top step was removed. A continuous sloping unreinforced concrete buttress encircles what remains. The buttress is 100 feet 4 inches (30.6 m) square at its base, 64 feet 6 inches (19.7 m) square at its top, and 20 feet 5 inches (6.2 m) high. The perimeter of the original top step of the old rubble foundation rests on the larger top of the concrete buttress. Its slope (lower external angle from the vertical) is 49°. This buttress rests in a depression (triangular cross-section) on the top surface of the concrete slab. The slab was constructed by digging pairs of 4-foot (1.2 m) wide drifts on opposite sides of the monument's center line to keep the monument properly balanced. The drifts were filled with unreinforced concrete with depressions or dowel stones on their sides to interlock the sections. The weight of the foundation is 36,912 long tons (41,341 short tons; 37,504 tonnes).

=== Cornerstone ===
The cornerstone was laid at the northeast corner of the lowest course of the old foundation on July 4, 1848. Therefore, the cornerstone was laid below the 1848 ground level. In 1880, the ground level was raised 17 feet (5.2 m). If the cornerstone had not been moved during the strengthening of the foundation in 1879–80, its upper surface would now be 21 feet (6.4 m) below the pavement just outside the northeast corner of the shaft. It would now be sandwiched between the concrete slab under the old foundation and the concrete buttress completely encircling what remains of the old foundation. During the strengthening process, about half by volume of the periphery of the lowest seven of eight courses or steps of the old foundation (gneiss rubble) was removed to provide good footing for the buttress. Although a few diagrams, pictures and descriptions of this process exist, the fate of the cornerstone is not mentioned.

The cornerstone was a 24,500-pound (11,100 kg) marble block 2.5 feet (0.76 m) high and 6.5 feet (2.0 m) square with a large hole for a zinc case filled with memorabilia. The hole was covered by a copper plate inscribed with the date of the Declaration of Independence (July 4, 1776), the date the cornerstone was laid (July 4, 1848), and the names of the managers of the Washington National Monument Society. The memorabilia in the zinc case included items associated with the monument, the city of Washington, the national government, state governments, benevolent societies, and George Washington, plus miscellaneous publications, both governmental and commercial, a coin set, and a Bible, totaling 73 items or collections of items, as well as 71 newspapers containing articles relating to George Washington or the monument.

=== Memorial stones ===
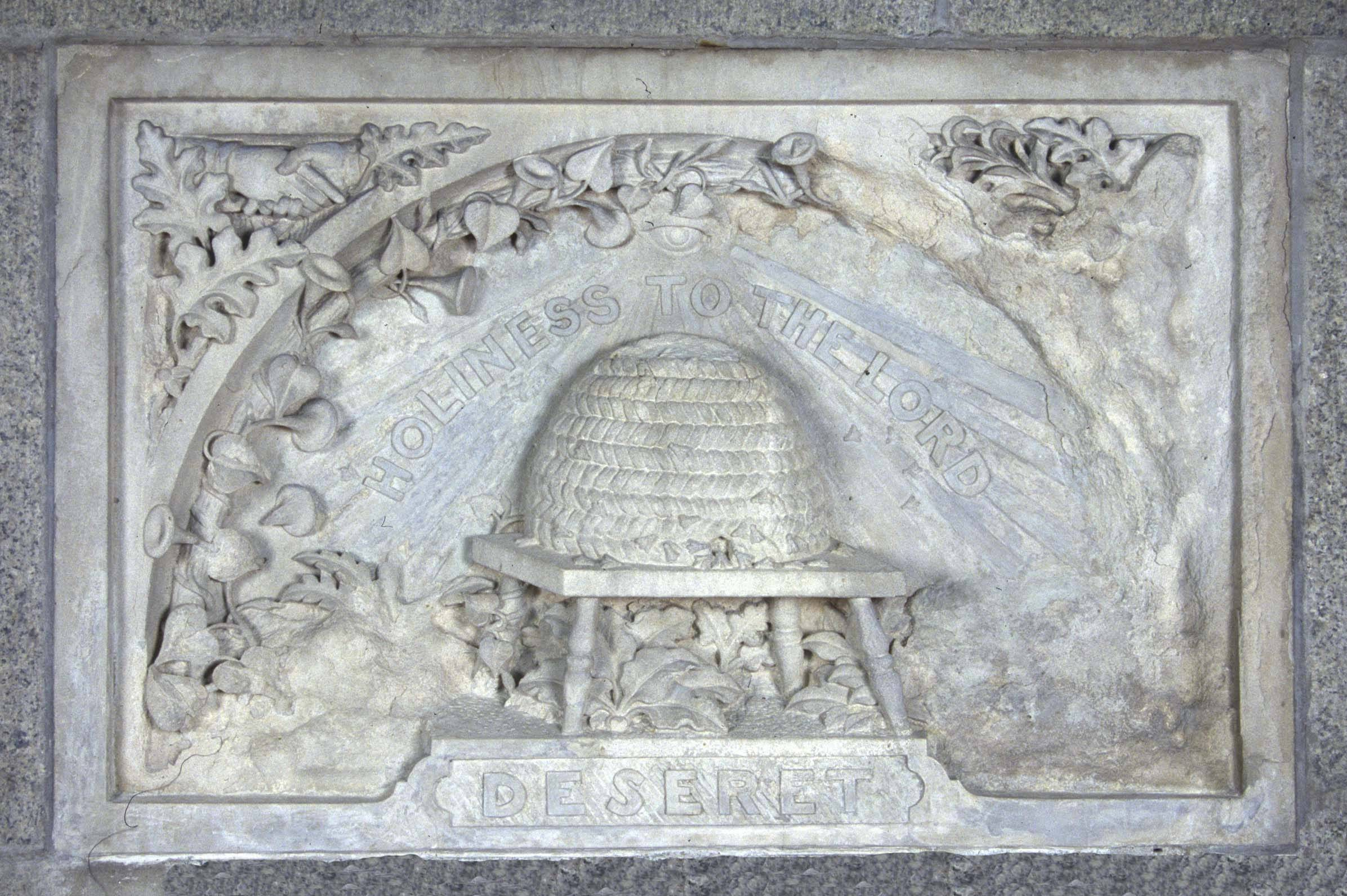
Memorial stone from Utah, representing the former provisional State of Deseret

States, cities, foreign countries, benevolent societies, other organizations, and individuals have contributed 194 memorial stones, all inserted into the east and west interior walls above stair landings or levels for easy viewing, except one on the south interior wall between stairs that is difficult to view. The sources disagree on the number of stones for two reasons: whether one or both "height stones" are included, and stones not yet on display at the time of a source's publication cannot be included. The "height stones" refer to two stones that indicate height: during the first phase of construction a stone with an inscription that includes the phrase "from the foundation to this height 100 feet" (30 m) was installed just below the 80–90-foot (24–27 m) stairway and high above the 60–70-foot (18–21 m) stairway; during the second phase of construction a stone with a horizontal line and the phrase "top of statue on Capitol" was installed on the 330-foot (100 m) level.

The Historic Structure Report (HSR, 2004) named 194 "memorial stones" by level, including both height stones. Jacob (2005) described in detail and pictured 193 "commemorative stones", including the 100 foot (30 m) stone but not the Capitol stone. The Historic American Buildings Survey (HABS, 1994) showed the location of 193 "memorial stones" but did not describe or name any. HABS showed both height stones but did not show one stone not yet installed in 1994. Olszewski (1971) named 190 "memorial stones" by level, including the Capitol stone but not the 100-foot stone. Olszewski did not include three stones not yet installed in 1971.

Of 194 stones, 94 are marble, 40 are granite, 29 are limestone, 8 are sandstone, with 23 miscellaneous types, including stones with two types of material and those whose materials are not identified. (Note: Material of the memorial stones is that named as "original material" by Judith Jacob, regardless of the material given in her "documentation" for the same stone. Some stones have small amounts of black paint, gold or silver within their letters. Six memorial stones are composed of significant amounts of two types of material each, the first stone and the second stone, lead or bronze. The material of seven memorial stones is not identified, including that of the Capitol stone.) Unusual materials include native copper (Michigan), pipestone (Minnesota), petrified wood (Arizona), and jadeite (Alaska). The stones vary in size from about 1.5 feet (0.46 m) square (Carthage) (Note: The Carthage stone was the last memorial stone installed in the monument, in 2000.) to about 6 by 8 feet (1.8 m × 2.4 m) (Philadelphia and New York City).

==== Specific inscribed stones ====
Utah contributed one stone as a territory and another as a state, both with inscriptions that include its pre-territorial name, Deseret, both located on the 220-foot (67 m) level.

A stone at the 240-foot (73 m) level of the monument is inscribed in Welsh: Fy Iaith, Fy Ngwlad, Fy Nghenedl, Cymry am byth (My Language, My Country, My Nation, Welsh forever). The stone, imported from Wales, was donated by Welsh citizens of New York. Two other stones were presented by the Sunday Schools of the Methodist Episcopal Church in New York and the Sabbath School children of the Methodist Episcopal Church in Philadelphia—the former quotes from the Bible verse Proverbs 10:7, "The memory of the just is blessed".

Ottoman Sultan Abdul Mejid I donated $30,000 toward the construction of the Washington Monument as a symbol of peace between the Ottomans and the Americans. The stone containing the Turkish inscriptions commemorating this event is on the 190-foot (58 m) level. The abbreviated translation of the inscriptions states, "So as to strengthen the friendship between the two countries. Abdul-Mejid Kahn has also had his name written on the monument to Washington."

One stone was donated by the Ryukyu Kingdom and brought back by Commodore Matthew C. Perry, but never arrived in Washington (it was replaced in 1989). Many of the stones donated for the monument carried inscriptions that did not commemorate George Washington. For example, one from the Templars of Honor and Temperance stated "We will not make, buy, sell, or use as a beverage, any spiritous or malt liquors, Wine, Cider, or any other Alcoholic Liquor." (George Washington himself had owned a whiskey distillery which operated at Mount Vernon after he left the presidency.)

=== Walls ===
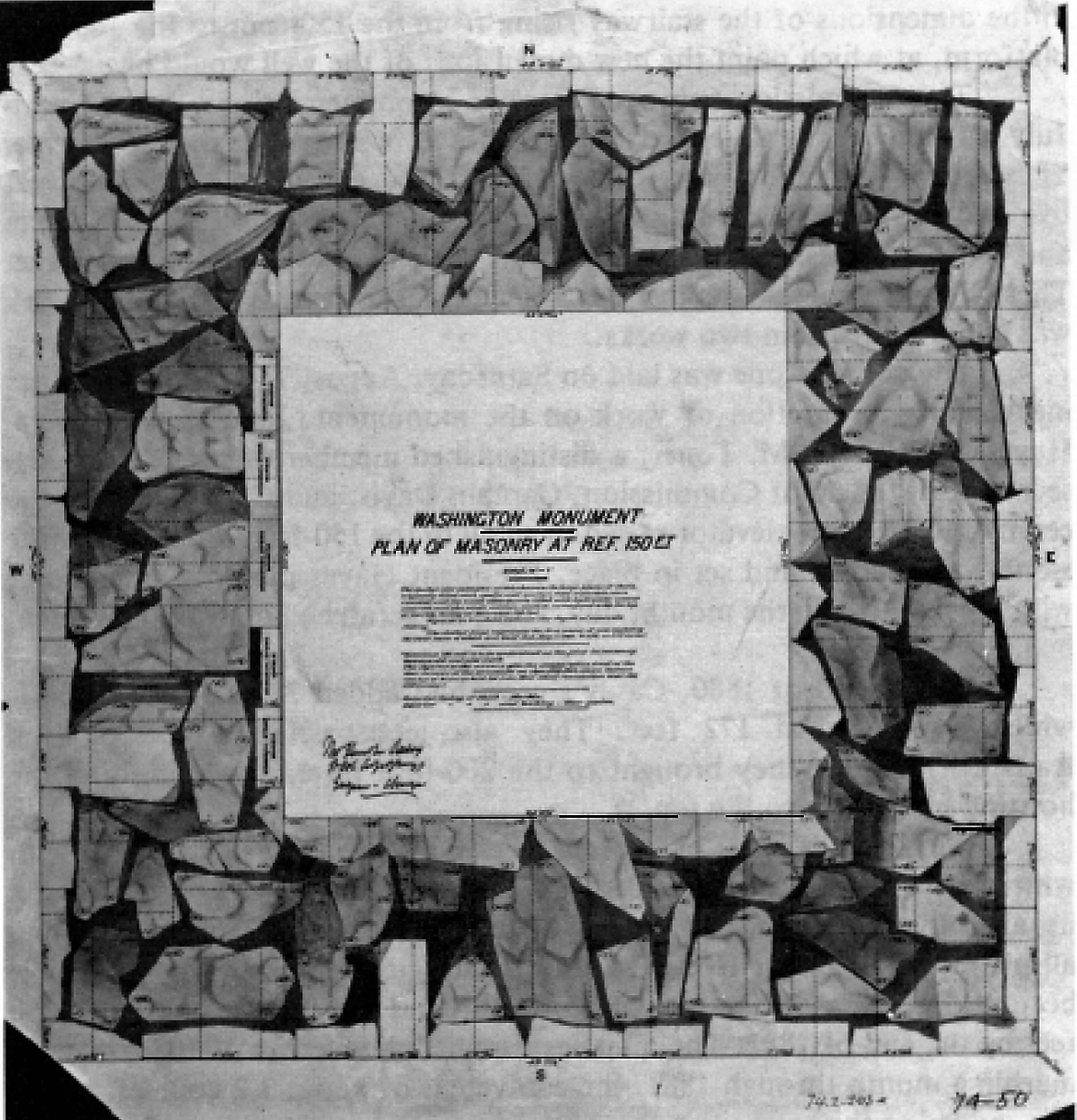
Cross section of rubble in shaft at 150-feet and typical of rubble below 150 feet

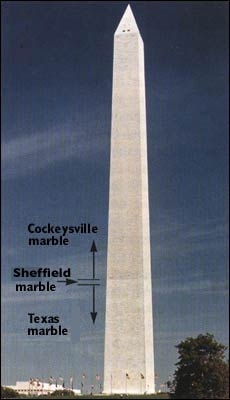
The three types (quarries) of marble used for the monument walls.

The bottom section of 152 feet (46 m) was built between 1848 and 1854 under the direction of William Dougherty. It uses white Cockeysville Marble from the Texas Quarry, a still-active quarry in Cockeysville, Maryland. During the second phase in 1879–1880, eight feet of white marble from Sheffield, Massachusetts, were laid above the "Texas" marble; this was halted due to quality control problems. The third and final phase of 390 feet (120 m) is marble from the Beaver Dam quarry adjacent to the Texas quarry (1880–1884). The marble here was a warmer shade than the starker white of the Texas quarry. The three different shades of marble can be distinguished on the monument. Engineers used three different systems to measure the monument's levels. The height of the marble walls was measured in 2-foot (0.61 m) increments, the pyramid-shaped top was measured in 4-foot (1.2 m) increments, and the stair landings were marked in 10-foot (3.0 m) increments. Complicating matters, the starting "zero point" for the staircase was different from the one used for the walls, and these references even shifted slightly when construction resumed for the second phase.

Since there was a long hiatus between the first phase and the last two phases, the monument has a complex superstructure. Around the 150-foot (46 m) level, the inner walls slope slightly outward, causing the hollow shaft inside to widen from about 25 feet (7.6 m) square to over 31 feet (9.4 m) square. Above this level, the monument's upper section has thinner walls. The lowest part of the upper section has walls measuring 8 feet (2.4 m) thick, which featured distinctively rounded corners; these walls gradually tapered to one and a half feet (0.46 m) thick at the top. The weight of this upper portion alone is 21,260 long tons (21,600 t). In total, the monument's interior walls rise to a height of just over 500 feet (150 m).

During the first phase of construction, the monument's walls were built with a less refined technique. While the outer surface is made of thick marble stones arranged in 2-foot-high (0.61 m) rows, the core of the walls was filled with a random assortment of bluestone rubble, all held together by mortar. At its base, this first section is 55 feet (17 m) square with massive 15-foot-thick (4.6 m) walls, and this lower portion alone weighs nearly 22,400 long tons (22,800 t). During the second phase, engineers used precisely cut blocks of marble and granite laid in an orderly, interlocking pattern with thick, stable joints. For strength, the marble exterior was initially backed-filled by granite blocks. As the monument rose, the builders gradually transitioned to using marble for the interior as well, until the structure above the 450-foot (140 m) level was made entirely of solid marble blocks.

=== Pinnacle ===
==== Pyramidion ====
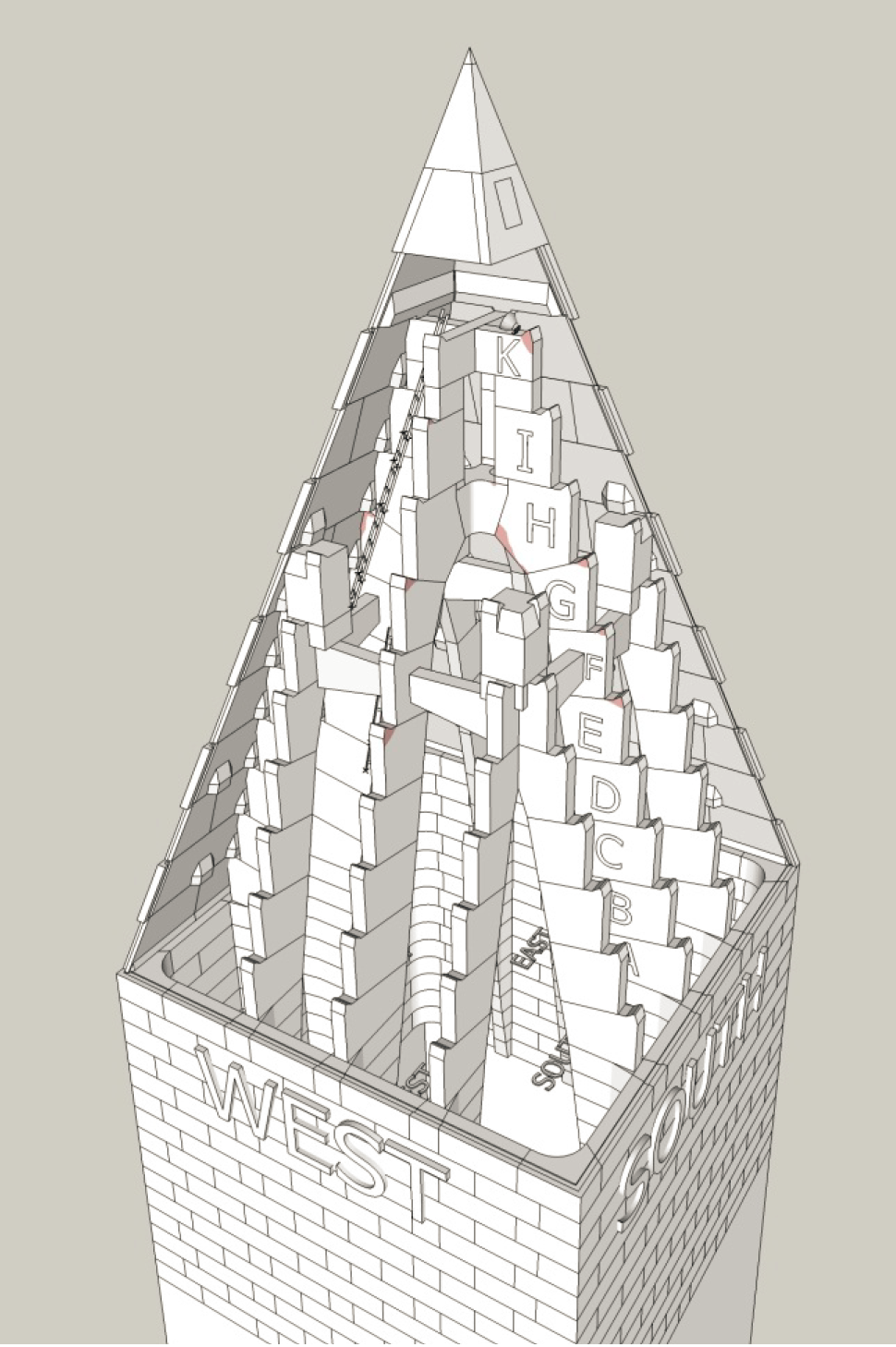
Rib structure of pyramidion with letter designations for courses

The pyramidion, atop the monument, has a marble capstone shaped like a truncated pyramid, with a cubical keystone projecting from its base and a deep groove surrounding the keystone. The aluminum apex replaces its truncated top. The inside upper edges of the topmost slabs on the four faces of the pyramidion rest on the keystone and in the groove. It has a large vertical hole through which a 1.5-inch (3.8 cm) threaded copper rod passes and screws into the base of the apex, which used to form part of its lightning protection system. The keystone and groove occupy so much of its base that only a small horizontal area near its outer edge remains. The weight of the capstone is transferred to both the inner and outer portions of the shiplap upper edges of the slabs. It weighs 3,300 pounds (1,500 kg), is 5 feet 2 inches (1.57 m) high from its base to its top, and is 3 feet (91 cm) square at its base.

The marble pyramidion has an extremely complex construction to save weight yet remain strong. Its surface slabs or panels are usually only 7 inches (18 cm) thick (with small thick and thin portions) and generally do not support the weight of slabs above them, instead transferring their own weight via 1-foot (30 cm) wide internal marble ribs to the shaft's walls. The slabs are generally 7 feet (2 m) wide and 4 feet 4 inches (1 m) high with a 2-inch (5 cm) vertical overlap (shiplap) to prevent water from entering the horizontal joints. Twelve such courses, the internal ribs, the marble capstone, and the aluminum apex comprise the pyramidion. Its height is 55 feet 0 inches (16.76 m). Its weight is 300 long tons (336 short tons; 305 tonnes). The slope of the walls of the pyramidion is 17°24' from the vertical. There are twelve ribs, three per wall, which spring from the 470-foot (143.3 m) level, all being integrated into the walls up to the 500-foot (152.4 m) level. All are free standing above 500 feet, relying on mortise and tenon joints to attach neighboring stones. The eight corner ribs terminate six courses above the shaft, each corner rib resting on its neighboring corner rib via a miter joint, forming four corner arches. Each such arch supports a pair of square corner stones, one above the other totaling one course in height. Each corner rib is linked to the nearest center rib at the sixth course via a marble tie beam. The four center ribs terminate eight courses above the shaft at a marble cruciform (cross shaped) keystone, forming two main arches that cross each other. Two stones, each one-course high, are mounted on each of the four ribs, supporting two additional courses above the cruciform keystone, leaving two courses to support the capstone's weight by themselves.

The observation floor (nominally the 500-foot level) is 499 feet 4 1/2 inches (152.21 m) above the entry lobby floor or lowest landing level. It is 1 1/4 inches (3.2 cm) above the marble base of the pyramidion and the top of the shaft walls.

Four pairs of 3-foot (91 cm) wide observation windows are provided, spaced 4 feet (122 cm) apart, inner stone edge to edge, all just above the lowest course of slabs (504-foot level). Six are 1 foot 6 inches (46 cm) high while two on the east face are 2 feet (61 cm) high for easier egress. All were originally provided with thin marble shutters in a bronze frame each of which could be opened inward, one left and the other right per wall. After two people committed suicide by jumping through the open windows in the 1920s, hinged horizontal iron bars were added to them in 1929. A ninth opening in a slab on the south face just below the capstone is provided for access to the outside of the pyramidion. It is covered by a stone slab which is internally removable. In 1931, four red aircraft warning lights were installed, one per face in one of its observation windows. Pilots complained that they could not be easily seen, so the monument was floodlit on all sides as well. In 1958, eight 14-inch (36 cm) diameter holes for new red aircraft warning lights were bored, one above each window near the top edge of the fourth course of slabs (516-foot level) in the pyramidion. In 1958 the observation windows were glazed with shatterproof glass. In 1974–1976, they were glazed with bulletproof glass and the shutters removed. New bulletproof glass was installed during 1997–2000.

The pyramidion has two inscriptions, neither of which is regarded as a memorial stone. One is the year "1884" on the underside of the cruciform keystone; the other is at the same level as that keystone on the north face of the west center rib containing the names and titles of the four highest ranked builders. Its inscription ("Chief Engineer ...") is almost identical to the inscription on the south face of the aluminum apex except for "U.S.", which is part of the phrase "14th U.S. Infantry" in the inscription inside the pyramidion, but the apex has only "14th Infantry". Additionally, the internal inscription does not use cursive writing and all letters in all names are capitals.

==== Aluminum apex ====
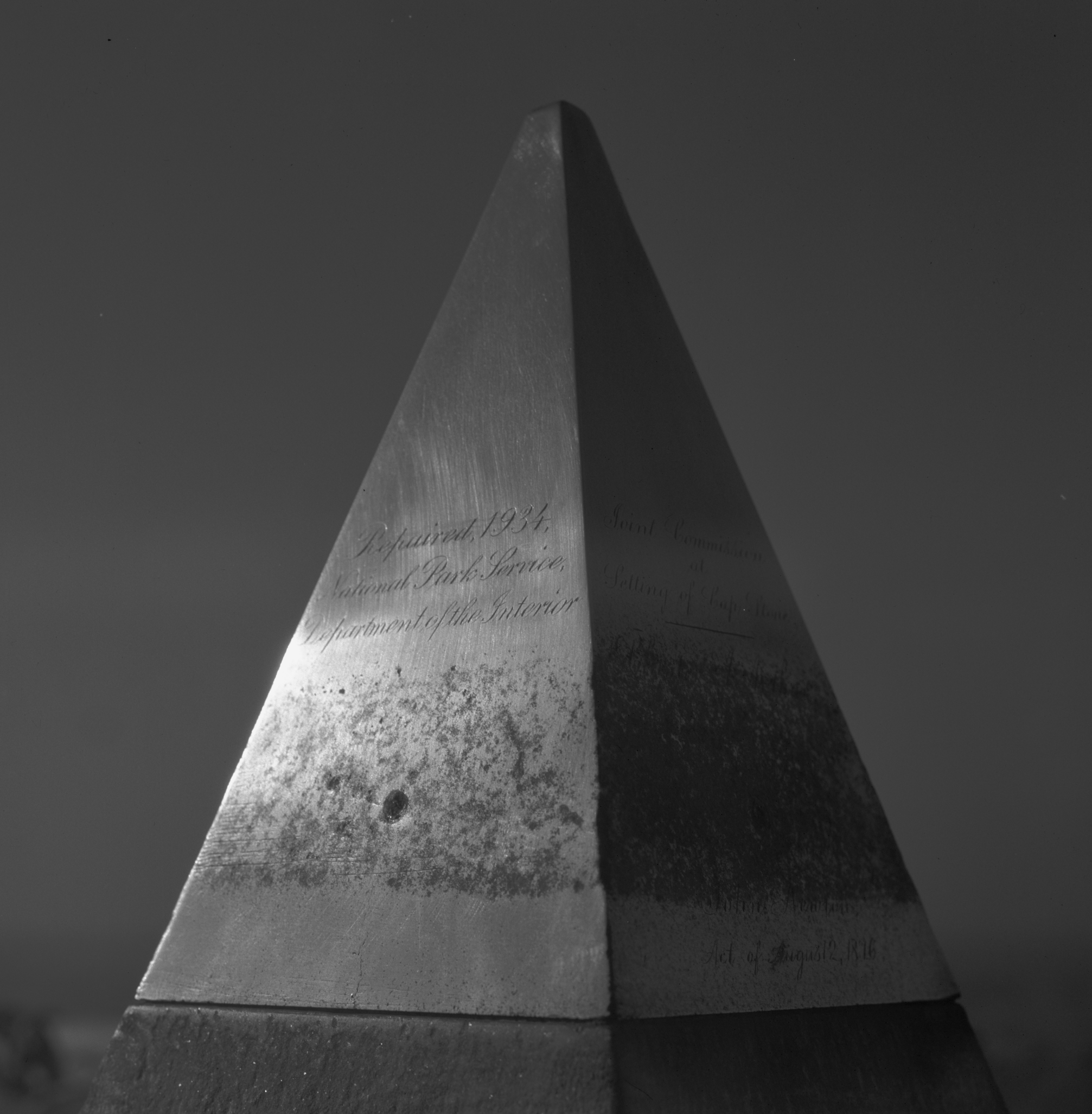
Aluminum apex showing inscriptions on its east (left) and north (right) faces

The aluminum apex, composed of a metal that at the time was as rare and valuable as silver, was cast by William Frishmuth of Philadelphia. At the time of casting, it was the largest piece of aluminum in the world. Before the installation, it was put on public display at Tiffany's in New York City and stepped over by visitors who could say they had "stepped over the top of the Washington Monument". It was 8.9 inches (23 cm) tall before 3/8 inch (1 cm) was vaporized from its tip by lightning strikes during 1885–1934, when it was protected from further damage by tall lightning rods surrounding it. Its base is 5.6 inches (14 cm) square. The angle between opposite sides at its tip is 34°48'. It weighed 100 ounces (2.83 kg) before lightning strikes removed a small amount of aluminum from its tip and sides. Spectral analysis in 1934 showed that it was composed of 97.87% aluminum with the rest impurities. It has a shallow depression in its base to match a slightly raised area atop the small upper surface of the marble capstone, which aligns the sides of the apex with those of the capstone, and the downward protruding lip around that area prevents water from entering the joint. It has a large hole in the center of its base to receive a threaded 1.5-inch (3.8 cm) diameter copper rod which attaches it to the monument and used to form part of the lightning protection system. In 2015 the National Geodetic Survey reported the coordinates of the 1 mm dimple atop the aluminum apex as 38°53′22.08920″N 77°2′6.92910″W (WGS 84).

The four faces of the external aluminum apex all bear inscriptions in cursive writing (Snell Round hand), which are incised into the aluminum. The apex was inscribed on site after it was delivered. Most inscriptions are the original 1884 inscriptions, except for the top three lines on the east face which were added in 1934. From 1885 to 1934 a wide gold-plated copper band that held eight short lightning rods, two per side but not at its corners, covered most of the inscriptions, which were damaged and illegible as shown in the accompanying picture made in 1934. A new band including eight long lightning rods, one at each corner and one at the middle of each side, was added in 1934 and removed and discarded in 2013. The inscriptions that it covered were still damaged and illegible in 2013.

The following table shows legible inscriptions in blue and illegible inscriptions in red; these colors do not appear on the actual apex, nor are they to scale.

| North face | West face | South face | East face |
|---|---|---|---|
| Joint Commission at Setting of Cap Stone. ————— Chester A. Arthur. W. W. Corcoran, Chairman. M. E. Bell. Edward Clark. John Newton. Act of August 2, 1876. | Corner Stone Laid on Bed of Foundation; July 4, 1848. First Stone at Height of 152 feet laid August 7, 1880. Capstone set December 6, 1884. | Chief Engineer and Architect, Thos. Lincoln Casey, Colonel, Corps of Engineers. Assistants: George W. Davis, Captain, 14th Infantry. Bernard R. Green, Civil Engineer. Master Mechanic, P. H. McLaughlin. | Repaired 1934, National Park Service, Department of the Interior. Laus Deo. |

Although Harvey (1903), Olszewski (1971), Torres (1984), and the Historic Structure Report (2004), refer to the original 1884 inscriptions, the National Geodetic Survey (2015) refers to both the 1884 and 1934 inscriptions. All sources print them according to their own editorial rules, resulting in excessive capitalization (Harvey, Olszewski, and NGS) and inappropriate line breaks. No printed source uses cursive writing, although pictures of the apex clearly show that it was used for both the 1884 and 1934 inscriptions.

A replica displayed on the 490-foot level uses totally different line breaks from those on the external apex—it also omits the 1934 inscriptions. In October 2007, it was discovered that the display of this replica was positioned so that the Laus Deo (Latin for "praise be to God") inscription could not be seen and Laus Deo was omitted from the placard describing the apex. The National Park Service rectified the omission by creating a new display.

==== Lightning protection ====
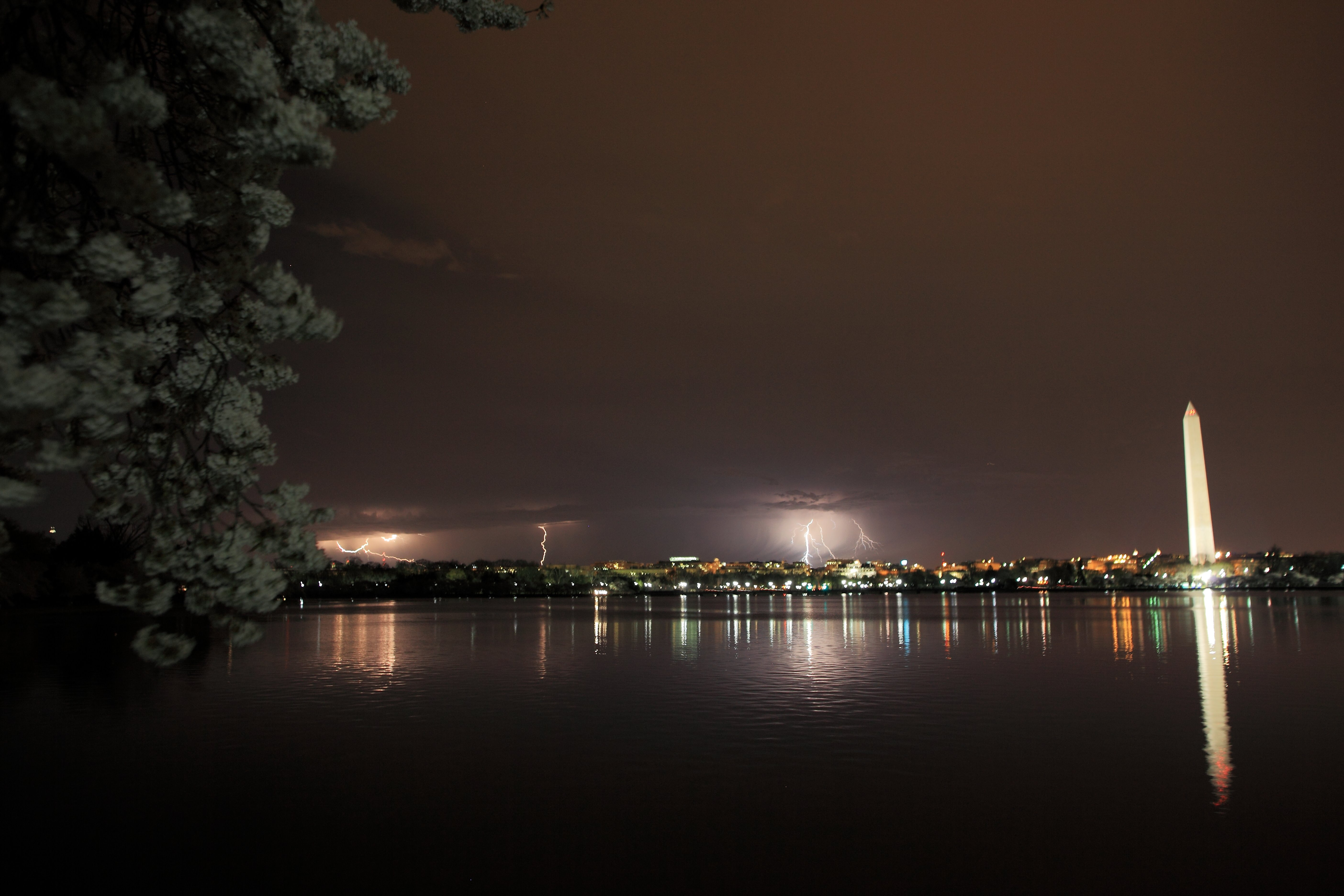
Lightning strikes near the Washington Monument

The pyramidion was originally designed with an 8.9-inch (23 cm) tall inscribed aluminum apex which served as a single lightning rod, installed December 6, 1884. Lightning damaged the marble blocks of the pyramidion on June 5, 1885, so a net of gold-plated copper rods supporting 200 3-inch (7.6 cm) gold-plated, platinum-tipped copper points spaced every 5 feet (1.5 m) was installed over the entire pyramidion. The original net included a gold-plated copper band attached to the aluminum apex by four large set screws which supported eight closely spaced vertical points that did not protrude above the apex. In 1934 these eight short points were lengthened to extend them above the apex by 6 inches (15 cm). In 2013 this original system was removed and discarded. It was replaced by only two thick solid aluminum lightning rods protruding above the tip of the apex by about one foot (0.3 m) attached to the east and west sides of the marble capstone just below the apex.

Until it was removed, the original lightning protection system was connected to the tops of the four iron columns supporting the elevator with large copper rods. Even though the aluminum apex is still connected to the columns with large copper rods, it is no longer part of the lightning protection system because it is now disconnected from the present lightning rods which shield it. The two lightning rods present since 2013 are connected to the iron columns with two large braided aluminum cables leading down the surface of the pyramidion near its southeast and northwest corners. They enter the pyramidion at its base, where they are tied together (electrically shorted) via large braided aluminum cables encircling the pyramidion two feet (0.6 m) above its base. The bottom of the iron columns are connected to ground water below the monument via four large copper rods that pass through a 2-foot (0.6 m) square well half filled with sand in the center of the foundation. The effectiveness of the lightning protection system has not been affected by a significant draw down of the water table since 1884 because the soil's water content remains roughly 20% both above and below the height of the water table.

=== Stairs and elevator ===
North interior wall with its stairs and their wire screening

The monument is filled with ironwork, consisting of its stairs, elevator columns and associated tie beams, none of which supports the weight of the stonework. It was redesigned in 1958 to reduce congestion and improve the flow of visitors. Originally, visitors entered and exited the west side of the elevator on the observation floor, causing congestion. So the large landing at the 490-foot level was expanded to a full floor and the original spiral stair in the northeast corner between the 490-and-500-foot (149.4 and 152.4 m) levels was replaced by two spiral stairs in the northeast and southeast corners. Now visitors exit the elevator on the observation floor, then walk down either spiral stair before reboarding the elevator for their trip back down.

The main stairs spiral up the interior walls from the entry lobby floor to the elevator reboarding floor at the 490-foot (150 m) level. The elevator occupies the center of the shaft well from the entry lobby to the observation floor, with an elevator machine room (installed 1925–26) whose floor is 18 feet 10 inches (5.74 m) above the observation floor and an elevator pit (excavated 1879) whose floor is 9 feet (2.74 m) below the entry lobby floor. The stairs and elevator are supported by four wrought iron columns each. The four supporting the stairs extend from the entry lobby floor to the observation floor and were set at the corners of a 15-foot-8-inch (4.78 m) square. The four supporting the elevator extend from the floor of the elevator pit to 14 feet (4.3 m) above the observation floor and were set at the corners of a 9-foot-9 1/2-inch (3.0 m) square. The weight of the ironwork is 275 long tons (308 short tons; 279 tonnes). Cast iron, wrought iron, and steel were all used. The two small spiral stairs installed in 1958 are aluminum.

Most landings occupy the entire east and west interior walls every 10 feet (3.05 m) from and including the east landing at the 30-foot (9.1 m) level up to the west landing at the 480-foot (150 m) level, east then west alternately. Three stairs with small landings rise from the entry lobby floor to the 30-foot (9.1 m) level successively along the north, west and south interior walls. Landings from the 30 foot (9.1 m) level up to the 150 foot (46 m) level are 3 feet 2 1/4 inches (0.97 m) by 25 feet 1 inch (7.65 m), while landings from the 160-foot (49 m) level to the 480-foot (150 m) level are 7 feet 10 3/4 inches (2.41 m) by 31 feet 5 1/2 inches (9.59 m). All stairs are on the north and south walls except for the aforementioned west stair between the 10–20-foot (3.05–6.10 m) levels, and the two spiral stairs.

About one quarter of visitors chose to ascend the monument using the stairs when they were available. They were closed to up traffic in 1971, and then closed to all traffic except by special arrangement in 1976. The stairs had 898 steps until 1958, consisting of 18 risers in each of the 49 main stairs plus 16 risers in the spiral stair. Since 1958 the stairs have had 897 risers if only one spiral stair is counted because both spiral stairs now have 15 risers each. These figures do not include two additional steps in the entry passage that were covered up in 1975 by a ramp and its inward horizontal extension to meet the higher (since 1886) entry lobby floor. One step was 3.2 feet (1 m) away from the outer walls and the other was at the end of the passage, 15 feet (4.6 m) away from the outer walls.

As initially constructed, the interior was relatively open with two-rail handrails, but a couple of suicides and an accidental fall prompted the addition of tall wire screening 7 feet (2.1 m) high with a large diamond mesh on the inside edge of the stairs and landings in 1929. The original steam powered elevator, which took 10 to 12 minutes to ascend to the observation floor, was replaced by an electric elevator powered by an on-site dynamo in 1901 which took five minutes to ascend. The monument was connected to the electrical grid in 1923, allowing the installation of a modern electric elevator in 1925–26 which took 70 seconds. The latter was replaced in 1958 and again in 1998 by 70-second elevators. From 1997 to 2000, the wire screening at three platforms was replaced by large glass panels to allow visitors on the elevator to view three clusters of memorial stones that were synchronously lit as the elevator automatically slowed while passing them during its descent.

=== Height ===
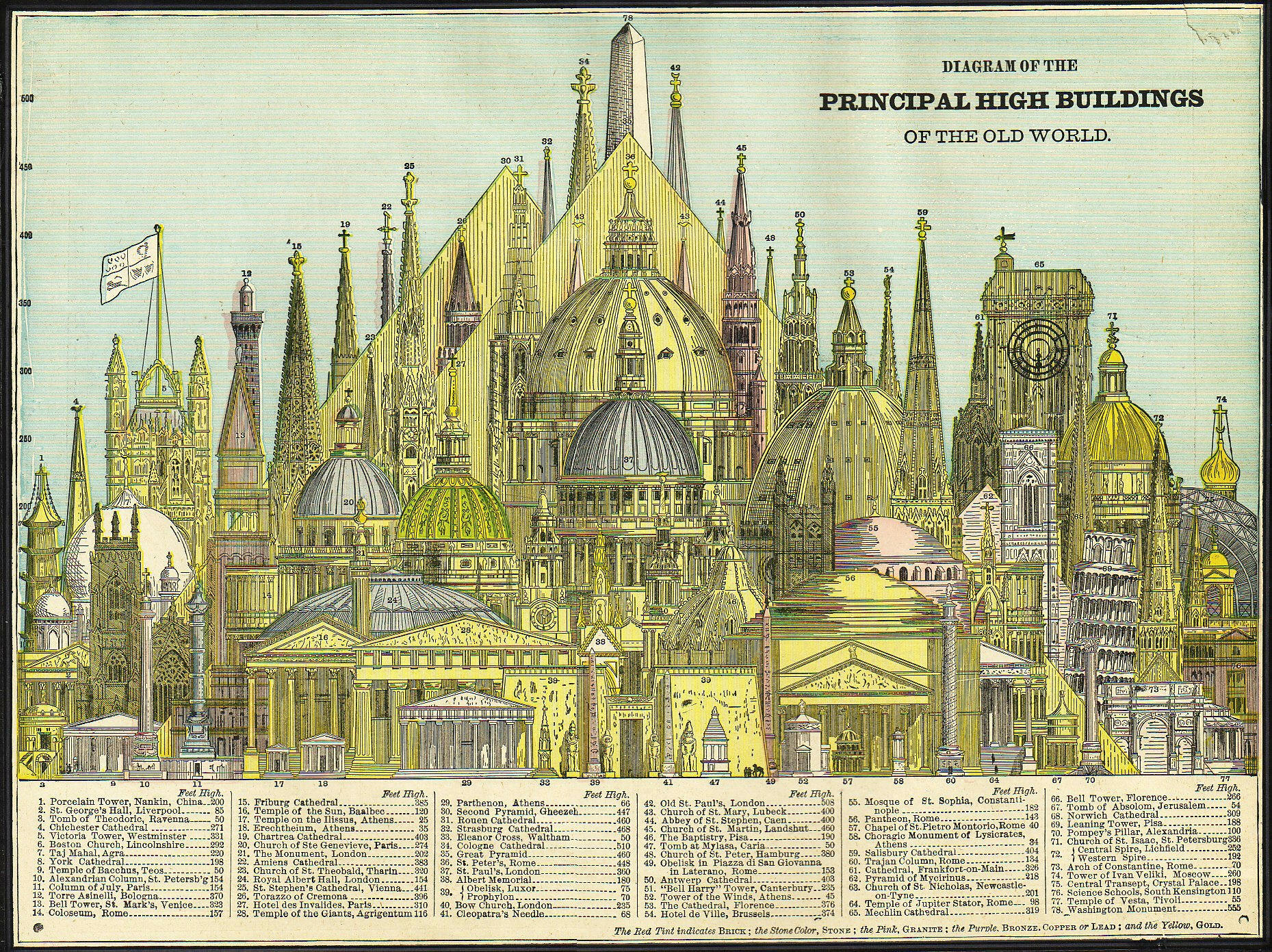
The Principal High Buildings of the Old World design from 1884 with Washington Monument as the tallest structure represented

The monument stands 554 feet 7 11/32 inches (169.046 m) tall according to the National Geodetic Survey (measured 2013–14) or 555 feet 5 1/8 inches (169.294 m) tall according to the National Park Service (measured 1884). In 1975, a ramp covered two steps at the entrance to the monument, so the ground next to the ramp was raised to match its height, reducing the remaining height to the monument's apex. It is the third tallest monumental column in the world, trailing only the Juche Tower in Pyongyang (560 ft/170 m) and the San Jacinto Monument in Houston, Texas (567.31 ft/172.92 m), though neither of those are all stone nor true obelisks.

The tallest masonry structure in the world is the brick Anaconda Smelter Stack in Montana at 585 feet 1 1/2 inches (178.35 m) tall; this includes a 30-foot (9.1 m) non-masonry concrete foundation, leaving the stack's brick chimney at 555 feet 1 1/2 inches (169.20 m) tall. If the monument's aluminum apex is also discounted, then the stack's masonry portion is 15 inches (38 cm) taller than the monument's masonry portion. (Note: Masonry, by definition, includes manufactured brick, natural stone units, and concrete masonry units. Taller stacks or chimneys are made of reinforced concrete. See the list of tallest towers (designed for regular public access), and the list of tallest chimneys (not designed for regular public access).)

=== Miscellaneous details ===
The weight of the above ground portion of the monument is 44,208 long tons (49,513 short tons; 44,917 tonnes), whereas its total weight, including the foundation below ground and any earth above it that is within its outer perimeter is 81,120 long tons (90,854 short tons; 82,422 tonnes). The total number of blocks in the monument, including all marble, granite and gneiss blocks, whether externally or internally visible or hidden from view within the walls or old foundation is over 36,000.

== Grounds ==
The monument is surrounded by an earthen terrace 60 feet (18 m) wide, with its top at the base of the walls and steeply sloped sides. This was constructed in 1880–81 over the reinforced foundation. During 1887–88, a knoll was constructed around the terrace tapering out roughly 300 feet (90 m) onto the surrounding terrain. This earthen terrace and knoll buttress the foundation.

=== Flags ===
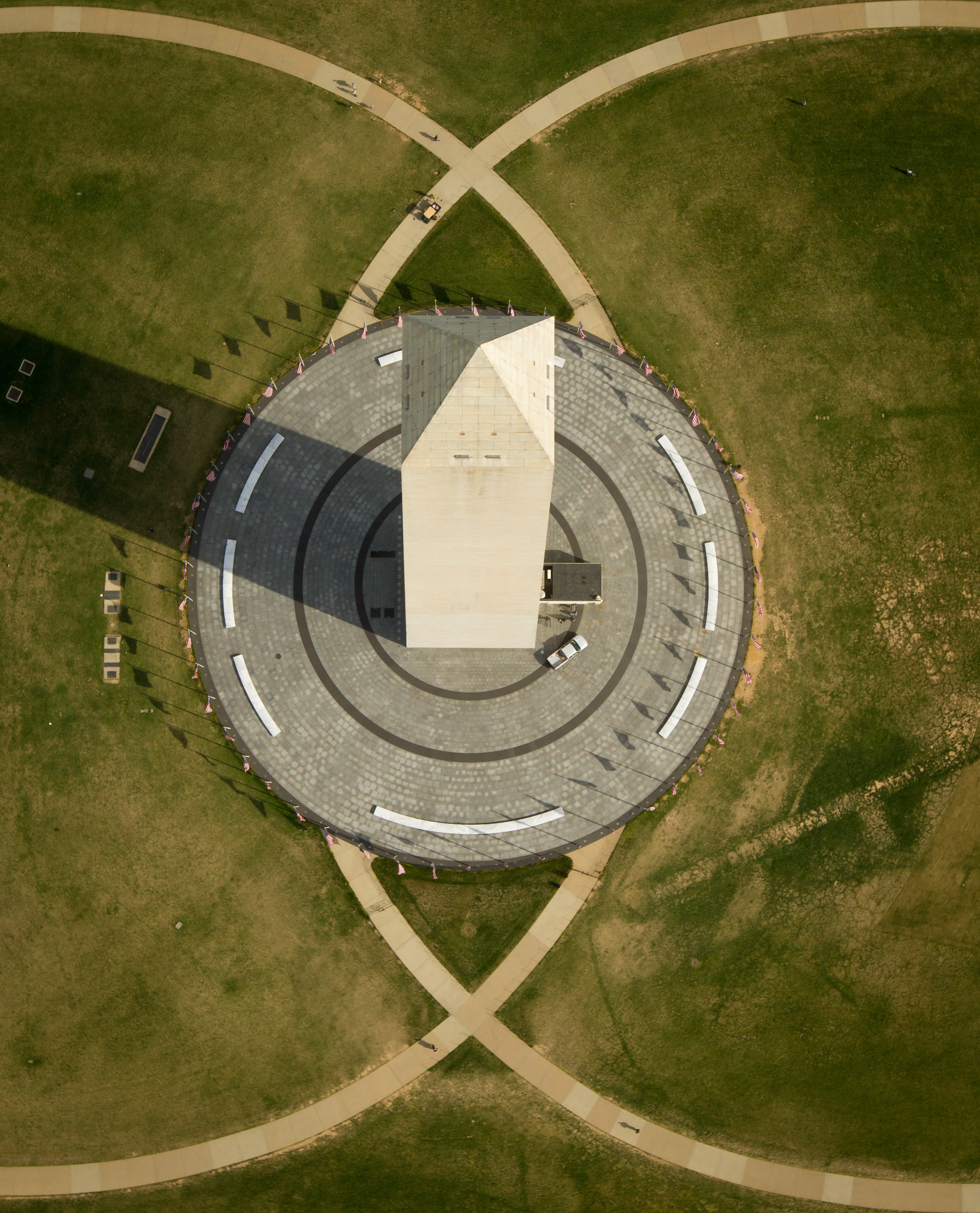
50 American flags representing the 50 U.S. states surround the Washington Monument.

Fifty U.S. national flags, one representing each state, are flown 24 hours a day around a large circle centered on the monument. Forty-eight American flags (one for each state then in existence) were flown on wooden flag poles on Washington's birthday since 1920 and later on Independence Day, Memorial Day, and other special occasions until early 1958. Both the flags and flag poles were removed and stored between these days. In 1958 fifty 25-foot (7.6 m) tall aluminum flag poles (anticipating Alaska and Hawaii) were installed, evenly spaced around a 260-foot (79 m) diameter circle. During 2004–05, the diameter of the circle was reduced to 240 feet (73 m). Since Washington's birthday in 1958, 48 U.S. flags were flown on a daily basis, increasing to 49 flags on July 4, 1959, and then to 50 flags since July 4, 1960. When fewer than 50 flags were flown, only the flag poles in use were placed into base receptacles, and all flags were removed and stored overnight. Since July 4, 1971, fifty U.S. flags have flown 24 hours a day.

== Visitation ==
The Washington Monument attracted enormous crowds before it officially opened. For six months after its dedication, 10,041 people climbed the stairs to the top. After the elevator that had been used to raise building materials was altered to carry passengers, the number of visitors grew rapidly, and an average of 55,000 people per month were going to the top by 1888, only three years after its completion and dedication. The annual visitor count peaked at an average of 1.1 million people between 1979 and 1997. From 2005 to 2010, when restrictions were placed on the number of visitors allowed per day, the Washington Monument had an annual average of 631,000 visitors. The national memorial was listed on the National Register of Historic Places on October 15, 1966, as with all historic areas administered by the National Park Service (an agency of the U.S. Department of the Interior) at the time.

=== Security ===
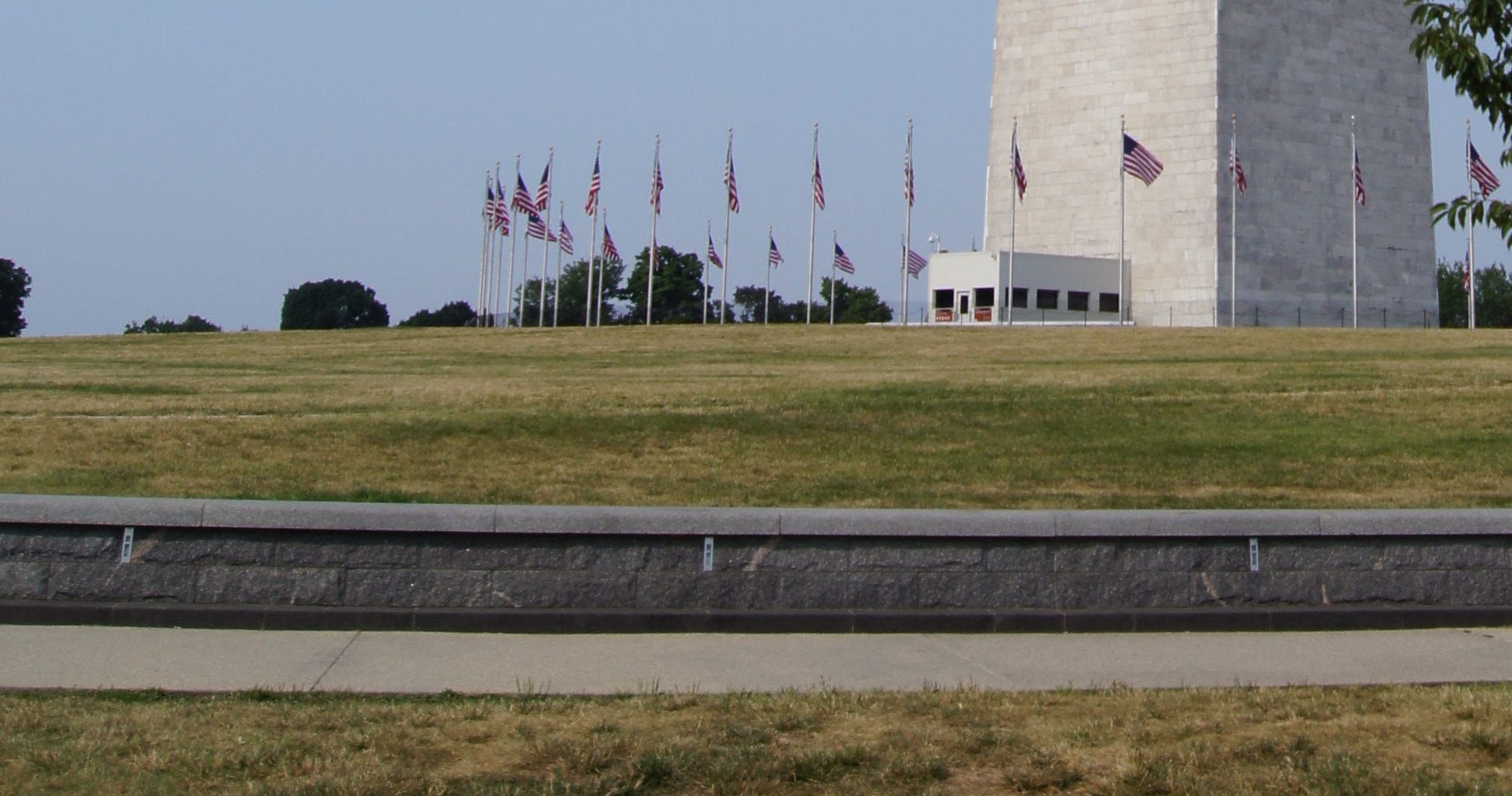
A low-profile ha-ha wall surrounds the monument.

In 2001, a temporary visitor security screening center – a one-story cube of wood around a metal frame – was added to the east entrance of the Washington Monument in the wake of the September 11 attacks. Visitors passed through metal detectors and bomb-sniffing sensors prior to entering the monument.

In 2019 a new 785-square-foot (72.9 m^{2}) two-story screening facility opened. Its exterior walls are slightly frosted, consisting of an outer sheet of bulletproof glass or polycarbonate, a metal mesh insert, and another sheet of bulletproof glass. The inner sheet consists of two sheets of laminated glass; a 0.5-inch (1.3 cm) airspace between the inner and outer glass walls provides thermal insultion. Geothermal heat pumps on the north side of the monument heat and cool the facility. The new facility also incorporates a staff office. The structure is designed such that it can be removed without damage to the monument.

A recessed trench wall known as a ha-ha has been built to minimize the visual impact of a security barrier surrounding the monument. After the September 11 attacks and another unrelated threat at the monument, authorities had put up a circle of temporary Jersey barriers to block the approach of vehicles. This barrier was replaced by a low 30-inch (76 cm) granite stone wall that doubles as a bench and also incorporates lighting. Designed by the famed landscape architect Laurie Olin, the installation received the 2005 Park/Landscape Award of Merit from the American Society of Landscape Architects.

== Replicas ==
In Ridgeland, Mississippi, off Interstate 55 at the corner of Colony Park Boulevard and Highland Colony Parkway, is a 190-foot (58 m) tall cellphone tower in the shape of the Washington Monument. Other replicas or close resemblances include those at the Jefferson Davis State Historic Site in Fairview, Kentucky, at 351 feet (107 m); Olalla, Washington, at 55 feet (17 m); and another in an office park in Alexandria, Virginia, at 30 feet (9.1 m). A 12-foot (3.7 m) high model is under a manhole near the Washington Monument and serves as a geodetic marker in a national geodetic control network.

== See also ==
- List of national memorials of the United States
- List of public art in Washington, D.C., Ward 2
- List of tallest freestanding structures
- List of tallest structures
- List of tallest structures built before the 20th century
- Adams Memorial (proposed)
- Architecture of Washington, D.C.
- Bunker Hill Monument
- Benjamin Franklin National Memorial
- Jefferson Memorial
- James Madison Memorial Building
- George Mason Memorial
- Memorial to the 56 Signers of the Declaration of Independence
- Presidential memorials in the United States
- Tuckahoe marble
- Washington Monument syndrome
- Yule Marble

== Notes ==
Records
| Preceded by Lincoln Cathedral | World's tallest structure ever built 1884–1889; 169.29 m | Succeeded by Eiffel Tower |
| Preceded by Cologne Cathedral | World's tallest existing structure 1884–1889 | Succeeded by Eiffel Tower |
