= 2026 in Florida =

- Decades: 2000s; 2010s; 2020s
- See also: History of Florida; Historical outline of Florida; List of years in Florida; 2026 in the United States

The following is a list of events of the year 2026 in the U.S. state of Florida, as well as predicted and scheduled events that have not yet occurred.

This year marked Florida's 181st anniversary as a state in the Union on March 3, 1845, and 205 years since Spain ceded Florida to the United States on February 22, 1821. This year also marked the 250th anniversary of the signing of the Declaration of Independence of the United States from the British Empire on July 4, 1776. Florida announced special events and exhibits, representing Florida as the 14th colony.

The Florida Legislature convened for its 2026 regular session between January 13 and March 13 amid a Republican trifecta, and passed around 235 bills. A special legislative session between April 28 and May 1 resulted in a redistricted congressional map ahead of the 2026 United States House of Representatives elections in Florida to give Republicans 4 more seats, leading to a 24-4 Republican-Democratic split. However, the redistricting ultimately failed as the 4 targeted Democrats maintained their seats. Another special legislative session between May 12 and 29 passed a $117.6 billion state budget for the 2026-2027 fiscal year. This was the second year in a row that the Florida Legislature had failed to pass the state budget within the regular session.

Florida Governor Ron DeSantis is term-limited. On August 18, U.S. Representative Byron Donalds won the Republican primary after being the frontrunner in a field consisting of Lieutenant Governor Jay Collins, hedge fund investor James Fishback, and former Florida house speaker Paul Renner; and former U.S. Representative David Jolly won the Democratic primary after being the presumptive nominee following the withdrawal of Orange County mayor Jerry Demings. On November 3, Byron Donalds was elected governor in the 2026 Florida gubernatorial election, the first Black governor elected in Florida and the first Black Republcian governor elected in the nation.

== Incumbents ==
=== State Government ===
- Executive Branch
  - Governor: Ron DeSantis (R)
  - Lieutenant Governor: Jay Collins (R)
  - Attorney General: James Uthmeier (R)
  - Chief Financial Officer: Blaise Ingoglia (R)
  - Commissioner of Agriculture: Wilton Simpson (R)
- Legislative Branch
  - Senate President: Ben Albritton (R)
  - House Speaker: Sam Garrison (R) (designate) (begins November 2026)
  - House Speaker: Wyman Duggan (R) (interim) (from August 21, 2026)
  - House Speaker: Daniel Perez (R) (until August 21, 2026)
- Judicial Branch
  - Chief Justice: John Couriel (since July 1, 2026)
  - Chief Justice: Carlos Muñiz (until July 1, 2026)

=== Chairs of Major Political Parties ===
- Republican Party of Florida: Evan Power
- Florida Democratic Party: Nikki Fried

== Events ==
=== January ===
- January 13 – Republican U.S. Representative Neal Dunn (FL-2) announces that he will not seek re-election. Attorney Austin Rogers (Republican) later wins the midterm election to succeed Dunn.
- January 14 – DeSantis appoints Adam Tanenbaum to the Supreme Court of Florida, succeeding Charles Canady.
- January 15 – The Florida Supreme Court removes the American Bar Association as the sole law school accreditor for Florida Bar admission.
- January 17 – Multiple far-right and manosphere influencers attend a Miami Beach nightclub, including Nick Fuentes, Andrew Tate, Clavicular, Sneako, and Myron Gaines. Videos surface of the influencers dancing to "Heil Hitler" and making Nazi salutes.
- January 19
  - The 2026 College Football Playoff National Championship is played at Hard Rock Stadium in Miami Gardens, where the Indiana Hoosiers defeat the Miami Hurricanes to claim their first title.
  - Uthmeier issues a formal attorney general opinion that race-based laws, including affirmative action, are unconstitutional and that his office will not enforce them.
- January 27 – Republican U.S. Representative Vern Buchanan (FL-16) announces that he will not seek re-election. Sydney Gruters (Republican), wife of the Republican National Committee chair Joe Gruters, later wins the midterm election to succeed Buchanan.
- January 28 – A Boca Raton nurse's license is suspended as a result of a TikTok video wishing harm on White House Press Secretary Karoline Leavitt during her pregnancy.
- January 29 – A Miami nurse relinquishes his nursing license following Facebook posts saying he would refuse anesthesia to MAGA patients.

=== February ===
- February 1 – The Florida Department of State announces that all 22 citizen initiatives for constitutional amendments are disqualified for the 2026 Florida general election ballot.
- February 3 – Education Commissioner Anastasios Kamoutsas warns students that they will face discipline if they participate in protests during the school day, particularly protests against ICE.
- February 4
  - Ryan Wesley Routh, the man who attempted to assassinate Trump in 2024 while he was golfing at his club in West Palm Beach, is sentenced to life in prison without the possibility of parole.
  - Fishback meets with students at the University of Central Florida, making antisemitic statements. Fishback's comments receive condemnation.
  - A drive-by shooting in the Magnolia Gardens neighborhood in Jacksonville wounds three women and one high school student. A 19-year old man was arrested, and the incident appears to have arisen from a street fight related to a romantic relationship. It is Florida's first mass shooting of the year.
- February 6 – The Florida Department of Highway Safety and Motor Vehicles begins administering all driver's license knowledge and skills exams in English only.
- February 8 – A mass shooting in the Paxon Shopping Center in Jacksonville wounds four people. It is Florida's second mass shooting of the year.
- February 9 – DeSantis declares a state of emergency due to severe weather conditions: a historic cold snap at the beginning of the month, wildfires, and a drought that affects 99% of the state.
- February 10
  - The Republican Party of Florida passes a rule limiting the chairman's ability to fundraise in congressional campaigns, following accusations against chair Evan Power.
  - Ronald Palmer Heath, a man convicted for murder of a traveling salesman during a Gainesville robbery in 1990, is executed via lethal injection at Florida State Prison; he is Florida's first execution of the year.
  - A spree killing between Fort Lauderdale and Bee Ridge kills seven people, including the 51-year old shooter by suicide. The targeted victims were the shooter's ex-girlfriend and her family. It is Florida's third mass shooting of the year.
- February 12–13 – For the 2026-2027 state budget, the House appropriates $113.6 billion and the Senate appropriates $115 billion. Neither meet the $117.4 billion proposed by DeSantis.
- February 14 – The University of Florida hires Uthmeier as adjunct faculty at the Levin College of Law teaching constitutional law, receiving a second six-figure salary from the government.
- February 15
  - Tyler Reddick of 23XI Racing wins the 2026 Daytona 500, Reddick's first victory in this race.
  - A mass shooting at a soul food restaurant in the Parramore neighborhood of Orlando wounds four people. A 16-year old teenager is later arrested, the incident appears to be gang related. It is Florida's fourth mass shooting of the year.
- February 17
  - The U.S. Department of Justice files a denaturalization case against former North Miami Mayor Philippe Bien-Aime. The DOJ claims that he fraudulently entered the U.S. from Haiti under a false name and remained despite a 2000 removal order.
  - Palantir announces they are moving their headquarters from Denver to Miami.
- February 20 – Fishback attempts to confront Donalds at Florida Gulf Coast University, and is removed by security. Fishback has made racist statements towards Donalds, an African-American, throughout the gubernatorial campaign.
- February 21 – A mass shooting at a sideshow in Jacksonville Beach wounds three adults and one minor. It is Florida's fifth mass shooting of the year.
- February 22
  - Secret Service agents fatally shoot 21-year old Austin Tucker Martin of North Carolina, who attempted to enter Mar-a-Lago while holding a shotgun and gas canister. Trump is not present at Mar-a-Lago when the incident occurs.
  - A mass shooting in the Eastside neighborhood in Jacksonville during a gathering to remember local rapper Lil Poppa wounds four people. It is Florida's sixth mass shooting of the year.
- February 24
  - Melvin Trotter, a man convicted for murder of a Manatee County grocery-store owner in 1986, is executed via lethal injection at Florida State Prison; he is Florida's second execution of the year.
  - The Florida Department of Health changes eligibility requirements for the state's AIDS Drug Assistance Program in an effort to cut $120 million in state expenses.
- February 25 – The Cuban coast guard exchange gunfire with ten passengers, all Cubans and Cuban Americans, on a stolen motor boat which departed from the Florida Keys. 5 passengers died and 5 are injured.

=== March ===
- March 3 – Billy Leon Kearse, a man convicted of killing a Fort Pierce police officer during a traffic stop in 1991, is executed via lethal injection at Florida State Prison; he is Florida's third execution of the year.
- March 4
  - The Miami-Dade County Republican Party secretary is revealed to have started a group chat with Florida International University student conservative leaders which contained multiple instances of antisemitism and anti-Black racism. FIU students sue the university over their disciplinary investigation on free speech grounds.
  - A mass shooting in South Apopka wounds four men. It is Florida's seventh mass shooting of the year.
- March 7 – Trump hosts the inaugural Shield of the Americas summit at Trump National in Doral.
- March 10
  - Miami Heat center Bam Adebayo scores 83 points in the Heat's victory over the Washington Wizards at the Kaseya Center. This is the second most points scored by a single player in an NBA game, second only to Wilt Chamberlain's 100 points scored in a 1962 game.
  - An explosive device is left outside MacDill Air Force Base in Tampa. Days later, two siblings are charged in connection to the device, though one suspect is reported to have flown to China and is not in custody.
- March 13 – Boca Raton council member Andy Thomson wins the 2026 Boca Raton mayoral election by five votes (7,572 votes), defeating his Republican opponents, energy executive Mike Liebelson (7,567 votes) and Boca Raton Vice Mayor Fran Nachlas (3,967 votes). Thomson is the first Democrat elected as Boca Raton mayor in over 30 years.
- March 14 – The University of Florida deactivate their chapter of College Republicans following a screenshot showing two students performing a Nazi salute. The UF College Republicans sue the university on free speech grounds.
- March 16
  - A 19-year-old Mexican man dies while in ICE custody at the Glades County Detention Center in Moore Haven. ICE reports his death as a suicide.
  - A shooting spree in Rivera Beach leaves 2 dead and 3 wounded. A 20-year old man is arrested, the incident appears to have arose from a fight at an apartment complex which then lead to multiple carjacking attempts. It is Florida's eighth mass shooting of the year.
- March 17
  - The 2026 World Baseball Classic championship is played at LoanDepot Park in Miami, where Venezuela defeat the United States 3-2 to claim their first title.
  - Michael Lee King, a man convicted of killing a 21-year-old woman in North Port in 2008, is executed via lethal injection at Florida State Prison; he is Florida's fourth execution of the year. This murder led Florida to enact laws in 2008 and 2010 requiring all 911 dispatchers to take mandatory training.
- March 18 – Crews demolish the Pulse nightclub in Orlando to make way for a memorial to the victims of the 2016 shooting.
- March 19 – DeSantis signs his first laws in 2026, two environmental bills: SB 302, streamlining the permit process for nature-based methods aimed at improving coastal resiliency, and HB 1417, abolishing the Environmental Regulation Commission within the Florida Department of Environmental Protection. The laws take effect on July 1, 2026.
- March 23
  - DeSantis signs SB 290 (Florida's Farm Bill) into law as sweeping agricultural reform: preventing local restrictions on gas-powered equipment, restricting high-density development on agricultural land, limiting emergency recovery loans to citizens, making permanent a statewide food bank program for farmers, and establishing loan repayment for veterinarians who specialize in livestock and equine care. The law takes effect on July 1, 2026.
  - ICE agents are deployed to 14 airports nationwide, including Southwest Florida International Airport, amid a partial federal shutdown affecting funding for TSA.
- March 24 – Democrats flip two state legislative seats in special elections. Emily Gregory defeats financial planner Jon Maples in HD87, a district covering part of Palm Beach County which includes Mar-a-Lago. Brian Nathan defeats state representative Josie Tomkow in SD14, a district covering parts of Brevard County and Volusia County.
- March 26 – The Florida Board of Governors removes sociology as a core general education requirement at all public universities, effective for the 2026-2027 academic year. However, sociology may still be offered as an elective.
- March 27 – Golfer Tiger Woods is charged with driving under the influence following a car crash on Jupiter Island; it is the fourth publicized car crash involving Woods.
- March 29 – A mass shooting in the Bond Westside neighborhood of Tallahassee wounds four people, causing students at the nearby Florida A&M University to shelter in place. It is Florida's ninth mass shooting of the year.
- March 30
  - DeSantis signs SB 706 into law, preempting the naming of major commercial service airports to the state. The law renames Palm Beach International Airport to President Donald J. Trump International Airport.
  - Trump and his son Eric unveil the plans for Trump's presidential library in Miami at Miami Dade College. Trump plans for the library to be a hotel.
- March 31 – DeSantis signs HB 445 (Missy's Law) into law, prohibiting the release of convicted dangerous criminals awaiting sentencing. The bill is named after a 5-year-old girl who was murdered in Tallahassee by a sex offender released on bail while waiting sentencing. The law takes effect on July 1, 2026.

=== April ===
- April 1
  - Coral Springs Vice Mayor Nancy Metayer Bowen is killed at her home in a suspected domestic homicide. Her husband is arrested.
  - NASA launches Artemis II from the Kennedy Space Center in Cape Canaveral. Four astronauts (Reid Wiseman, Victor Glover, Christina Koch, and Jeremy Hansen) perform a flyby of the Moon and return to Earth on April 10.
  - DeSantis signs HB 991 into law, requiring voters to provide proof of U.S. citizenship to vote. Supporters call this law the Florida version of the proposed federal SAVE Act. The law takes effect on January 1, 2027.
- April 2 – Uthmeier issues an attorney general opinion that the Florida Constitution's prohibition on government funding of religious institutions violates the federal First Amendment, and that the Establishment Clause does not prohibit state governments from promoting Christianity.
- April 6
  - DeSantis signs HB 1471 into law, creating a procedure to designate domestic terrorist organizations. Critics worry the law will be used to infringe on free speech criticizing the government. The law takes effect on July 1, 2026.
  - Rapper Offset is shot and injured outside the Seminole Hard Rock Hotel & Casino Hollywood in Hollywood.
- April 10 – Tallahassee transfers city-owned assets in Tallahassee Memorial Hospital to Florida State University.
- April 12
  - The implosion of the Mandarin Oriental on Brickell Key in Miami is to make way for a new, larger complex scheduled to be completed by 2030.
  - Jacksonville Sheriff's Office police officer and pastor Antonio Richardson rescues a man who attempted to jump off the Dames Point Bridge.
- April 14
  - DeSantis signs SB 628 into law, renaming Florida State Road 80 after Trump and renaming Tallahassee International Airport after former Florida State Seminoles head coach Bobby Bowden. The law takes effect July 1, 2026.
  - Fishback's campaign prevents three Jewish students from attending an event at the University of South Florida. Fishback denies the incident occurred. USF Dean Danielle McDonald later resigns amid scrutiny.
- April 16
  - The Florida Supreme Court unanimously elects John Couriel as Chief Justice, he will begin a two-year term on July 1.
  - A Florida International University student is arrested and charged with threatening over messages she posted in a WhatsApp group chat for an engineering capstone. The messages included ones reading, "Netanyahu, if you can hear me, drop some bonbons for us capstone students in Ocean Bank Convention Center." and "There is going to be a bomb in the Ocean Bank Convocation Center, and it is going to be [another student]'s fault."
- April 20 – DeSantis signs SB 182 into law as a broad education package. The bill requires every public school to place George Washington and Abraham Lincoln portraits, have students be proficient in cursive writing by the fifth grade, creates a teacher mentorship program for public schools, and allows small private schools to operate in commercial buildings without rezoning. The law takes effect July 1, 2026
- April 21
  - Democratic U.S. Representative Sheila Cherfilus-McCormick (FL-20) resigns from Congress before an expulsion hearing is held. The House Ethics Committee found that Cherfilus-McCormick committed 25 violations by laundering federal relief funds for her re-election campaign.
  - The U.S. Eleventh Circuit Court of Appeals rules that Alligator Alcatraz is not regulated by the National Environmental Policy Act because Florida, not the federal government, had constructed and controlled the facility.
  - Uthmeier opens a criminal investigation into OpenAI over it “offering significant advice” to Phoenix Ikner, the suspect in the 2025 Florida State University shooting.
  - Chadwick Scott Willacy, a man convicted of the murder of a woman in Palm Bay during a burglary in 1990, is executed via lethal injection at Florida State Prison; he is Florida's fifth execution of the year.
- April 22 – DeSantis signs SB 1134 and HB 1217 into law, prohibiting local governments from adopting diversity, equity, and inclusion and net-zero emission policies. SB 1134 takes effect January 1, 2027, and HB 1217 takes effect July 1, 2026.
- April 28 – Republican U.S. Representative Daniel Webster (FL-211) announces that he will not seek re-election.
- April 30 – James Ernest Hitchcock, a man convicted of the rape and murder of his stepniece in Winter Garden in 1976, is executed via lethal injection at Florida State Prison; he is Florida's six execution of the year.

=== May ===
- May 1 – Former Republican U.S. Representative David Rivera and his associate Esther Nuhfer are convicted of failing to register as foreign agents for lobbying on behalf of the Venezuelan government during the first Trump administration.
- May 3 – The 2026 Miami Grand Prix is held at the Miami International Autodrome in Miami Gardens. Kimi Antonelli of Mercedes wins.
- May 4 – DeSantis signs HB 1-D into law, authorizing a new congressional map of Florida which gives Republicans 4 more seats ahead of the 2026 midterm election.
- May 5 – DeSantis signs two bills into law affecting teachers: SB 1296 requires at least 50% participation in union certification elections for public workers unions and penalizes strikes, and HB 1279 provides immediate pay incentives to high-performing teachers at lower-performing schools without collective bargaining. Critics say the bills are intended to weaken teachers unions who criticize the government. The laws take effect on July 1, 2026.
- May 6
  - Google seeks approval from the U.S. Environmental Protection Agency to release millions of male mosquitos carrying Wolbachia into Florida to reduce the population of mosquitos that carry dengue, Zika and chikungunya.
  - The U.S. Eleventh Circuit Court of Appeals rules that the Immigration and Nationality Act does not impose mandatory detention without bond on people merely present in the country's interior who are not actively seeking admission, freeing two Mexican nationals who were held without bond following traffic stops in Florida.
- May 7 – DeSantis signs SB 484 into law, allowing local governments to plan the development of data centers used in artificial intelligence and protecting consumers from paying public utilities for data centers. However, the bill does not restrict non-disclosure agreements between governments and data center companies. The bill is a watered down version the "AI Bill of Rights" that DeSantis proposed for heavier regulations on AI. The law takes effect on July 1, 2026.
- May 9
  - A mass shooting at a house party in Reddick wounds five people. It is Florida's tenth mass shooting of the year.
  - Eleven people are injured after a boat explosion near North Miami Beach.
- May 10 – A wildfire is sparked in the Everglades, leading to road closures and the closure of Everglades Holiday Park.
- May 12 – The New York Times reports that DeSantis plans to shut down Alligator Alcatraz due to lack of funding.
- May 15 – DeSantis signs HB 757 into law as a sweeping school safety package. The bill mandates training to help faculty detect mental health issues, mandates that public colleges and universities create plans for active shooter responses, and allows trained public college and university faculty to carry firearms. Critics warn that arming faculty will not increase school safety. The law takes effect immediately.
- May 19 – Joe Trippi, Howard Dean's former presidential campaign manager, joins David Jolly's gubernatorial campaign team.
- May 21 – Richard Andrew Knight Jr., a man convicted of murdering a mother and her daughter in Coral Springs in 2002, is executed via lethal injection at Florida State Prison; he is Florida's seventh execution of the year.
- May 22
  - DeSantis signs SB 538 and SB 178 into law, allowing high school coaches to receive additional funding from support organization and spend up to $15,000 of their own money per year on their players. SB 178 is named after Teddy Bridgewater, an NFL quarterback who was suspended from coaching high schoolers in July 2025 for spending money on his players' meals and transportation. The laws take effect July 1, 2026.
  - DeSantis signs SB296 (Helping Abuse Victims Escape Now (HAVEN) Act) into law, formally defining “dating violence” in law and extending existing domestic violence safeguards. Additionally, Florida will adopt a silent alert system for victims unable to safely call 911, a first in the country.
- May 26
  - R. Fred Lewis, a Justice on the Florida Supreme Court between 1998 and 2019, dies at the age of 78.
  - The Bluey experience, Bluey's Wild World at Conservation Station, opens at Disney's Animal Kingdom.
- May 28 – Blue Origin's New Glenn rocket explodes during a hot-fire test at Cape Canaveral Space Force Station. The rocket was scheduled to carry Amazon satellites into space.
- May 29 – The Florida Supreme Court authorizes judges to sanction lawyers and pro-se litigants who file court documents with AI hallucinations.

=== June ===
- June 1
  - Uthmeier sues OpenAI in Highland County state court over security lapses under the Florida Deceptive and Unfair Trade Practices Act.
  - Trump nominates Speaker Perez as U.S. Ambassador to Brazil.
- June 2 – Andrew Richard Lukehart, a man convicted of the murder of his girlfriend's child in Jacksonville in 1996, is executed via lethal injection at Florida State Prison; he is Florida's eighth execution of the year.
- June 4 – Texas Attorney General Ken Paxton opens an investigation into Boca Raton based Celsius, an energy drink company, over marketing dangerously high caffeine levels to children. Uthmeier later responds on X with "come and take it."
- June 5 – Orange County Mayor Jerry Demings suspends his gubernatorial campaign after a prostate cancer diagnosis, leaving David Jolly as the presumptive Democratic nominee .
- June 8 – A 6.1 magnitude earthquake off the coast of Cuba, the region’s strongest tremor in 150 years, is felt in Florida.
- June 10
  - The Florida Supreme Court allows the 2026 redistricting map to be used in the 2026 midterm elections.
  - David Jolly taps former U.S. representative Gwen Graham as his running mate.
- June 11 – In Perlmutter v. Federal Insurance Company, the Florida Supreme Court unanimously rules that plaintiffs only need to show a reasonable evidentiary basis, a low burden of proof, to plead for punitive damages under Florida law. The underlying case regards former Marvel Entertainment CEO Issac Perlmutter seeking punitive damages in a defamation lawsuit filed against his neighbor in Palm Beach.
- June 11–July 19 – The United States hosts the 2026 FIFA World Cup, with a number of matches being held in Hard Rock Stadium in Miami Gardens.
- June 12
  - The Republican Party of Florida states cancels gubernatorial primary debates as Bryon Donalds is the only candidate who meets internal qualification criteria. DeSantis criticizes the decision as "engineering the outcome."
  - Republican James Uthmeier, the incumbent Attorney General, and Democrat José Javier Rodríguez, a former Assistant Secretary of Labor and state senator, become the main party nominees for the 2026 Florida Attorney General election by default as they were the only candidates to qualify for their respective primaries.
- June 13 – A mass shooting at a block party in the Sherwood Forest neighborhood of Jacksonville wounds four people. It is Florida's eleventh mass shooting of the year.
- June 15
  - The Florida Everblades defeat the Kansas City Mavericks 5–4 in game six after double overtime of the 2026 Kelly Cup Finals to win the series 4–2. It is their fourth title in five years.
  - Uthmeier sues TikTok in a St. Lucie County court for targeting and harming children.
- June 16 – DeSantis signs SB 432 (Meg's Law) into law, prohibiting tobacco or nicotine dealers from selling nitrous oxide. The bill is named after a woman who died of nitrous oxide use outside of a smoke shop. The law takes effect on October 1, 2026.
- June 23 – A man shoots and kills his grandfather and injures three family members in The Acreage. It is Florida's twelfth mass shooting of the year.
- June 25
  - DeSantis announces that the immigration detention center Alligator Auschwitz has closed.
  - Dusty Ray Spencer, a man convicted of the murder of his wife in 1992, is executed via lethal injection at Florida State Prison; he is Florida's ninth execution of the year.
- June 26
  - DeSantis vetoes SB 382, setting speed limits of 10 mph on sidewalks for electric bikes and electric scooters, on grounds that it is government overreach. The Florida Legislature had unanimously passed the bill.
  - DeSantis vetoes HB 461, allowing high school students to get credit for volunteering as assistant poll workers, on grounds that the Southern Poverty Law Center would use the law to staff polling places with only their supporters. The Florida Legislature had unanimously passed the bill.
- June 28
  - DeSantis vetoes HB 325, allowing inmates to earn commercial drivers' licenses, on grounds that it will burden the Department of Corrections. The Florida Legislature had unanimously passed the bill.
  - DeSantis vetoes SB 688, creating a healthcare license and regulatory Board for naturopathic doctors, on grounds that healthcare practitioners can already provide alternative treatments and the bill would've required applicants to receive an N.D. degree from accredited schools which were all outside of the state.
- June 29 – DeSantis signs HB 5011-E, the state budget of $117.6 billion for the 2026-2027 fiscal year, but issues a line-item veto against $1.6 billion.

=== July ===
- July 1 – John Couriel is sworn in as the 58th Chief Justice of Florida.
- July 2
  - The Florida Board of Education pass a rule prohibiting undocumented immigrants from attending the state's public colleges and universities, beginning in the 2026-2027 school year. Critics denounce the decision as unconstitutional and potentially costing the state $15 million in lost tuition and fees.
  - Conservative podcaster Patrick Bet-David hosts a debate between Republican gubernatorial candidates Fishback, Collins and Rennner. The frontrunner Donalds declined to participate.
- July 3
  - Children and Families Secretary Taylor Hatch resigns following a report alleging that she mismanaged the state's food assistance program, which can result in a $1 billion penalty.
  - DeSantis aides accuse Collins's wife Layla of running anonymous accounts on X to promote Collins's gubernatorial campaign and criticize DeSantis. Layla has denied the allegations and the accounts were deleted.
- July 4 – A shooting near Florida's Turnpike in South Miami Heights kills two people and wounds two others. It is Florida's thirteenth mass shooting of the year.
- July 5 – A shooting in Pensacola kills a 19-year-old and injured six others. It is Florida's fourteenth mass shooting of the year.
- July 6 – Republicans commissioners from St. Johns County are criminally charged with voter fraud regarding false guides claiming to be official endorsements of candidates sent to Republican voters ahead of the primaries for the 2024 U.S. elections.
- July 7
  - The U.S. Eleventh Circuit Court of Appeals strikes down Florida's Stop WOKE Act on free speech grounds.
  - Andrew Gillum, the 2018 Democratic gubernatorial candidate, is arrested on drug charges in Alabama.
- July 8 – Former Republican state senator Jack Latava dies at the age of 74.
- July 9 – The Florida Supreme Court unanimously rules that The Florida Bar cannot discipline a lawyer for political speech under the First Amendment. The underlying case regards an attorney who made several disparaging remarks towards his rival in a state attorney election.
- July 10
  - The U.S. 11th Circuit Court of Appeals refers lawyer and former state representative Anthony Sabatini for sanctions over filing court documents with AI hallucinations.
  - A shooting in Lehigh Acres wounds four people. It is Florida's fifteenth mass shooting of the year.
- July 14
  - A man is struck and killed by a semi-truck while fleeing ICE agents in St. Augustine.
  - Dennis Michael Sochor, a man convicted of a murder of an 18-year old woman in Ft. Lauderdale in 1981, is executed via lethal injection at Florida State Prison; he is Florida's tenth execution of the year.
- July 15 – A Blue Angels pilot flies at a low altitude during a flight demonstration in Pensacola Beach, sending sand, chairs, and beach umbrellas into the air. U.S. Defense Secretary Pete Hegseth declines to punish the pilot, writing "Flyovers will continue until morale improves".
- July 16
  - U.S. Health Secretary RFK Jr. and U.S. Agriculture Secretary Brooke Rollins tout a "Make Hospital Food Healthier" initiative at Tampa General Hospital.
  - The University of Central Florida Board of Trustees approves a 15% increase of out-of-state tuition for the 2026-2027 year, estimating the increase will bring an additional $9.8 million.
- July 18 – Social media influencer Andrew Tate and his brother Tristan are arrested in Miami by the U.S. Marshals to be extradited to the United Kingdom, where they have been charged with rape and sex trafficking.
- July 20 – Bloomberg announces that Miami’s cost of living has surpassed New York’s for the first time.
- July 22 – U.S. assistant secretary of labor Henry Mack is appointed Florida's education commissioner following Anastasios Kamoutsas's departure to become the president of Polk State College.
- July 27
  - A Leon County judge rules that Fishback can remain on the ballot following a residency lawsuit from his rival Collins.
  - A shooting in Jacksonville kills a woman and injures three men. It is Florida's sixteenth mass shooting of the year.
- July 28 – James Aren Duckett, convicted of the rape and murder of an 11-year old girl in Lake County in 1987, and Dominick Occhicone, convicted of the murder of his ex-girlfriend's parents in Pasco County in 1986, are executed via lethal injection five hours apart at Florida State Prison; Florida's eleventh and twelfth executions of the year. This is the first double execution carried out in a single day in a U.S. death penalty state since Arkansas in 2017 and the first in Florida since 1964. At the same time, Occhicone is the oldest person to be executed in Florida at the age of 80.

=== August ===
- August 4 – Blogger Perez Hilton is hospitalized after harming himself on a TikTok livestream at his Miami home.
- August 18
  - 2026 Florida elections
    - Republican Bryon Donalds and Democratic David Jolly win their primaries for the gubernatorial election.
    - Republican Ashely Moody and Democratic Angie Nixon win their primaries for the Senate special election, with Nixon winning in an upset against Alex Vindman.
    - Republican Wilton Simpson and Democratic Joey Atkins win their primaries for the agriculture commissioner election.
    - Republican Blaise Ingoglia and Democratic Annette Taddeo win their primaries for the chief financial officer election.
  - Mike Caruso, the clerk of the circuit court and comptroller of Palm Beach County, is arrested on child sexual abuse charges and is suspended from office.
  - DeSantis accepts the resignation of Kevin Guthrie, the director of the Florida Division of Emergency Management, one day after Guthrie joined Collins’ ticket as running mate in the Republican Primary for Governor. Following Collins' defeat in the primaries, Guthrie regretted his decision, proclaiming, "I knew my choice was a gamble and even a long shot. But I never imagined that I would lose my job for being added." DeSantis explained, "I don’t want to be in a situation where there’s politics in emergency management, I think you got to choose one or the other."
  - William Frances Silvia Jr., convicted of fatally shooting his estranged wife and wounding his mother-in-law in Orlando in 2006, is executed via lethal injection at Florida State Prison; he is Florida's thirteenth execution of the year.
- August 21 – The Jaws Souvenirs store in Panama City Beach is destroyed by a fire.
- August 22 – ICE detains the father of a USS Abraham Lincoln sailor in Key West. He is released two days later.
- August 24 – A federal judge rules that Florida International University violated the free speech rights of students who were disciplined for silently wearing T-shirts that said "ICE OFF FIU" in front of a crowd gathered inside a campus building.
- August 25 – Byron Donalds taps state senator Bryan Avila, a Cuban-American, as his running mate.
- August 26 – CBS News publishes a leaked grand jury report from January finding that the DeSantis administration misappropriated $10 million in taxpayer money during the Hope Florida scandal.
- August 28 – Ecuadorian politician José Serrano, an enemy of President Daniel Noboa, is deported to Ecuador. His arrest in 2025 occurred days after Noboa met DHS Secretary Kristi Noem in Ecuador. Following his deportation, Serrano is held in a maximum-security prison.
- August 29 – White supremacist Paul Nicholas Miller (known online as "GypsyCrusader") fights Jewish and Israeli-American fighter Ben Azoulay in a kickboxing match at the Kia Center in Orlando. After winning the match, Miller appears to give Nazi salutes from the ring and makes antisemitic remarks toward Azoulay.
- August 31 – The Florida Department of Transportation ends permits for Flock cameras on state roads and orders police departments to remove them within 30 days.

=== September ===
- September 1
  - The Republican Party of Florida Leadership Forum is held at T. Pepin's Hospitality Center in Tampa, with DeSantis interviewing the Republican primary winners for executive office positions. DeSantis endorses Bryon Donalds to succeed him as governor after staying neutral during the primaries.
  - Harold Gene Lucas, convicted of fatally shooting his ex-girlfriend in Bonita Springs in 1976, is executed via lethal injection at Florida State Prison; he is Florida's fourteenth execution of the year.
- September 3 – The Florida Board of Governors prohibits undocumented students from enrolling at any state university.
- September 5 – Two guards at the closed Alligator Alcatraz are charged with assaulting a detainee in January.
- September 6 – Amazon cargo plane 21 Air Flight 7598 overshoots the runway and strikes a van at Miami International Airport, killing five people, all cleaning company employees in the van.
- September 10 – Daniel Owen Conahan Jr., the suspected serial killer of the 1990s Hog Trail Murders in Charlotte County, is executed via lethal injection at Florida State Prison; he is Florida's fifteenth execution of the year.
- September 14
  - Four people are injured when a crane collapses in Miami, hitting a passing car. The injured include three construction workers and the car's owner.
  - Republican U.S. Representative María Elvira Salazar releases an ad warning Trump that his immigration policy has "gone too far."
- September 20
  - Democratic candidate Jolly declines all debates with Republican candidate Donalds for the gubernatorial election, citing Donalds' previous refusal to debate his primary opponents.
  - 18 people are extradited from Haiti to Miami to face charges related to the assassination of Jovenel Moïse. American officials say part of the assassination's planning occurred in southern Florida.
- September 23 – Uthmeier sues The New York Times in a Manhattan court, arguing that NYT's anti-Israeli coverage harms shareholder value for the state’s agencies and public sector retirees.
- September 29 – Curtis Wilkie Beasley Sr., convicted in the murder of a woman in 1995 near Orlando, is executed via lethal injection at Florida State Prison; he is Florida's sixteenth execution of the year.
- September 30 – The Florida Department of Highway Safety and Motor Vehicles releases a new driver's license with historic motifs such as the Castillo de San Marcos and "Let Us Alone" motif from Florida's first state flag.

=== October ===
- October 5
  - Broward County Sheriff Gregory Tony suspends budget talks with the Broward County Commission, citing an active investigation by the Florida Office of Statewide Prosecution into county commissioners. The feud arose over transferring public-safety responsibilities from the Sheriff's Office to county control.
  - Two people, including a 10th grade student, are killed in a school bus crash in Winter Haven.
- October 6 – Former CIA official David J. Rush pleads guilty to wire fraud for misusing public funds to acquire luxury real estate properties in South Florida.
- October 7 – The Florida First District Court of Appeals rules that the routing of funds involved in the Hope Florida scandal was entirely legal and not public money, and orders the grand jury report expunged for exceeding their duties.
- October 8 – DeSantis withdraws the death warrant on William Lee Thompson, convicted of the 1976 Miami kidnapping, rape, and murder of 23-year-old woman. This is the first time DeSantis has withdrawn a death warrant he signed. While DeSantis did not provide a reason for his decision, Florida law prohibits the execution of persons with intellectual disability and Thompson's lawyers argue that Thompson suffers from dementia. Journalists also believe that the controversy arising from Christina Pike's failed execution in Tennessee may have played a factor.
- October 9 – Hurricane Isaias makes landfall in western Florida as the first hurricane in the 2026 Atlantic hurricane season. Two deaths are reported in Escambia County.
- October 13 – James Robertson, convicted in the murder of his cellmate in 2008, is executed via lethal injection at Florida State Prison; he is Florida's seventeenth execution of the year.
- October 14 – The U.S. Eleventh Circuit Court of Appeals upholds Florida's law (HB 3) restricting social-media accounts for children under 14 and requiring parental consent for children aged 14 and 15 on certain platforms, saying the government's interest outweighs free speech interests.
- October 16 – A U.S. District Court in Miami sentences art dealer Leslie Howard Roberts to 3 years and 10 months in prison for conspiracy to commit wire fraud and fines him nearly $2.6 million for selling fake Andy Warhol paintings.
- October 17 – The Florida Panthers become the first team in the National Hockey League to record a natural hat trick in three consecutive games.
- October 19
  - A Miami judge signs an arrest warrant for Raúl Castro following Uthmeier filing murder charges against him for the downing of two civilian planes that killed four Americans in 1996.
  - The U.S. Eleventh Circuit Court of Appeals rules that Escambia County School District members could not invoke legislative privilege to avoid depositions about their decisions to remove particular books, clarifying that the school board's actions were an administrative action.
- October 20 – William Reaves, convicted in the murder of a police officer in 1986 in Vero Beach, is executed via lethal injection at Florida State Prison; he is Florida's eighteenth execution of the year.
- October 21 – Kissimmee Mayor Jackie Espinosa is arrested on charges of grand theft and organized scheme to defraud. The allegations concern the city's COVID-relief grant program, which Espinosa helped create. State investigators said businesses connected to her family received $90,000 in grants, including $50,000 for Espinosa's own businesses.
- October 22 – The Florida Supreme Court rules that that the pre-suit notice requirement enacted in 2021 for property-insurance lawsuits did not apply retroactively to insurance policies issued before the statute's effective date.
- October 24 – A mass shooting near Florida A&M University's Bragg Memorial Stadium in Tallahassee leaves 12 people injured. An unnamed 15-year old boy is accused as the shooter.
- October 27 – DeSantis designates John Anderson's Seminole Wind as Florida's state anthem by executive order.
- October 28
  - The Florida Commission on Ethics finds probable cause that Alachua County Public Schools Superintendent Kamela Patton did not disclose an LLC as intangible personal property on her 2023 and 2024 financial disclosure forms.
  - Brazilian presidential candidate Flávio Bolsonaro and his family flee to Miami after his loss in the 2026 Brazilian presidential election. Bolsonaro is accused of corruption, money laundering and tax evasion in Brazil.
- October 29 – The Florida Department of Education discloses a cybersecurity breach of a student financial aid website which potentially exposed Social Security numbers and other personal information belonging to as many as 4.9 million people.

=== November ===
- November 1
  - A Learjet 60 crashes in Greenacres en route to the Bahamas, producing a fireball and killing all nine people on board.
  - Florida State Seminoles football fires head coach Mike Norvell amid a 3-5 season; he is replaced by Rick Stockstill in an interim capacity.
- November 3
  - 2026 Florida elections:
    - 2026 Florida gubernatorial election: Republicans Byron Donalds and Bryan Ávila are elected as Florida governor and lieutenant governor, defeating David Jolly and Gwen Graham by 50.02%-48.71%. Donalds is the first elected African-American governor in Florida history, and the first elected African-American Republican governor in U.S. history.
    - 2026 Florida Attorney General election: Republican James Uthmeier, the incumbent, defeats Democratic José Javier Rodríguez by 50.9%-49.1%.
    - 2026 Florida Chief Financial Officer election: Republican Blaise Ingoglia, the incumbent, defeats Democratic Annette Taddeo by 50.9%-49.1%.
    - 2026 Florida Commissioner of Agriculture election: Republican Wilton Simpson, incumbent, defeats Democratic Joey Mendoza Atkins by 51.1%-48.9%.
    - 2026 Florida Senate election: Republicans win a majority, but lose their supermajority after Democrat John Lowndes flips the seat held by Republican Senate President Pro Tempore Jason Brodeur in an upset election.
    - 2026 Florida House of Representatives election: Republicans win a majority, but lose their supermajority after Democrats flip 15 seats, particularly from Central Florida.
    - 2026 United States House of Representatives elections in Florida: The Florida delegation remains unchanged with 20 Republicans to 8 Democrats. All 4 Democrats targeted by the 2026 Florida redistricting retain their seats.
    - 2026 United States Senate special election in Florida: Ashley Moody wins election, beating Angie Nixon.
    - Amendment 3 passes, increasing the $50,000 homestead property tax exemption to $150,000 in 2027, and then to $250,000 in 2028. Supporters argue the measure provides financial relief as housing costs rise, but opponents warn it will reduce local government services. Amendment 3 was Governor DeSantis's last policy initiative before leaving office.
- November 4 – A man crashes into a Citibank building in Tampa and fatally shoots an employee before being shot and killed by a security guard. The gunman owed $2,500 to the bank and had threatened the company prior to the shooting.
- November 5 – Jesse Guardado, convicted in the murder of a woman in 2004 in Walton County, is executed via lethal injection at Florida State Prison; he is Florida's nineteenth execution of the year, matching Florida's record in 2025.
- November 6 – Thomas Markle, the father of Meghan Markle, is arrested in Lakeland for possessing child pornography.
- November 10 – Delray Beach cancels its 2027 St. Patrick's Day parade and Pride parade, citing a recent law (SB 1134) that bans municipalities from funding events considered to be DEI. DeSantis calls the action "malicious compliance" and argues the new law does not target St. Patrick's Day parade.
- November 12 – Governor-elect Byron Donalds delivers his first public appearance and post-victory speech during a State University System Board of Governors retreat at Florida International University. Donalds calls the close election humbling and emphasizes serving all 23 million Floridians across all ideologies.
- November 13 – Uthmeier issues a formal attorney general opinion that the state’s 2018 bump stock ban is unconstitutional under the Second Amendment and that his office will no longer enforce it.
- November 19 – A Plant City man fatally shoots his wife and their three children before killing himself.

=== Scheduled events ===
- December – The 2026 G20 Miami summit will be held at Trump National Doral Miami.

== See also ==
- 2026 in the United States
