= 2020 in Florida =

- Decades: 2000s; 2010s; 2020s
- See also: History of Florida; Historical outline of Florida; List of years in Florida; 2020 in the United States

The following is a list of events of the year 2020 in Florida.

== Incumbents ==
=== State government ===
- Governor: Ron DeSantis (R)

== Events ==
- Ongoing – COVID-19 pandemic in Florida
- January 13 – The United States expels 21 Royal Saudi Air Force cadets. Amid an investigation into the Saudi Arabian military following the attack on Naval Air Station Pensacola in Florida, the cadets were found to have jihadist material and child pornography on their phones. However, none of the cadets are believed to have assisted the gunman in the attack.
- January 20 – A man is arrested for a series of 40 rapes in the Miami area in the 1980s.
- April 1 – Governor Ron DeSantis issues a stay-at-home order due to rising COVID-19 cases.
- April 20 – Miami Police disperses crowds who violated social distancing guidelines during David Guetta's coronavirus relief concert in the city.
- May 15 – A United States Air Force F-22 Raptor stealth fighter crashes outside of Eglin Air Force Base, the pilot safely ejects.
- May 27 – The May 24 arrest of a 23-year-old man in Tampa is announced by federal prosecutors. He had allegedly been planning a mass shooting at Honeymoon Island State Park in support of ISIS.
- June 14 – Florida reports two consecutive days of 2,000-plus new COVID-19 cases as more counties reopen their beaches. Miami's mayor says this information does not include data from Memorial Day weekend and the George Floyd protests.
- June 15 – Black Lives Matter activist Oluwatoyin Salau is found dead in Tallahassee, after going missing on June 6. Shortly before her disappearance, Salau tweeted that she had been sexually assaulted by a black man. Her death was treated as a homicide.
- September 11 – It is announced that bars in South Florida counties such as Miami-Dade and Palm Beach County will remain closed. However, bars in the rest of the state will be allowed to reopen at a 50% capacity.
- September 13 – Hurricane Sally approaches from the Gulf of Mexico with sustained winds of 50 mph (80 km/h). Flood watches are issued for Florida's west coast, including Tampa.
- September 16 – Part of the Pensacola Bay Bridge in Pensacola collapses due to a crane falling on it during Hurricane Sally's approach.
- September 27 – Black Swan manslaughter case
- October 28 – The National Weather Service issues storm surge warnings from the mouth of the Atchafalaya River, Louisiana, to Navarre, Florida.
- November 3 – 2020 Florida Amendment 1 is held and passes. The amendment changes the state constitution to make citizenship a requirement to vote in the state of Florida.

== See also ==
- 2020 in the United States
