= 2021 in Florida =

- Decades: 2000s; 2010s; 2020s
- See also: History of Florida; Historical outline of Florida; List of years in Florida; 2021 in the United States

The following is a list of events of the year 2021 in Florida.

== Incumbents ==
=== State government ===
- Governor: Ron DeSantis (R)

== Events ==
- Ongoing – COVID-19 pandemic in Florida
- January 22 – Florida reports 277 COVID-19 related deaths in 24 hours, tying their previous state record set in August of the previous year.
- January 28 – Tampa Mayor Jane Castor issues an outdoor mask mandate for the city during Super Bowl LV.
- February 2 – 2021 Sunrise, Florida shootout: Two FBI agents are killed and three others are wounded during a shootout in Sunrise, while serving an arrest warrant. The gunman is later found dead. This is the deadliest incident involving FBI agents since 1986.
- February 25–28 – The 2021 Conservative Political Action Conference is held at the Hyatt Regency Orlando.
- May 9 – Murder of Tristyn Bailey
- June 1 – Governor Ron DeSantis signs a bill, the Fairness in Women's Sports Act (SB 1028). It bans transgender girls and women from participating and competing in middle-school and high-school girls' and college women's sports competitions in Florida. The law took effect on July 1.
- June 24 – Surfside condominium collapse
- October 16
  - Colombian businessman Alex Saab is extradited to the United States from Cape Verde ahead of an initial court appearance in Florida on October 18 over his alleged money laundering for the Venezuelan government.
  - Lucy, a NASA spacecraft that will visit Jupiter's trojan asteroids in twelve years, launches at 05:34 EDT from Cape Canaveral.
- October 20 – Stoneman Douglas High School shooting: Nikolas Jacob Cruz, who is accused of the 2018 mass shooting at Marjory Stoneman Douglas High School in Parkland, pleads guilty on all 34 charges.
- November 1 – U.S. federal judge Robert N. Scola Jr. of the Southern District of Florida dismisses seven of eight charges of money laundering against Alex Saab, who is accused of moving $350 million out of Venezuela into accounts controlled in the U.S. and other countries.
