= 2022 in Florida =

- Decades: 2000s; 2010s; 2020s
- See also: History of Florida; Historical outline of Florida; List of years in Florida; 2022 in the United States

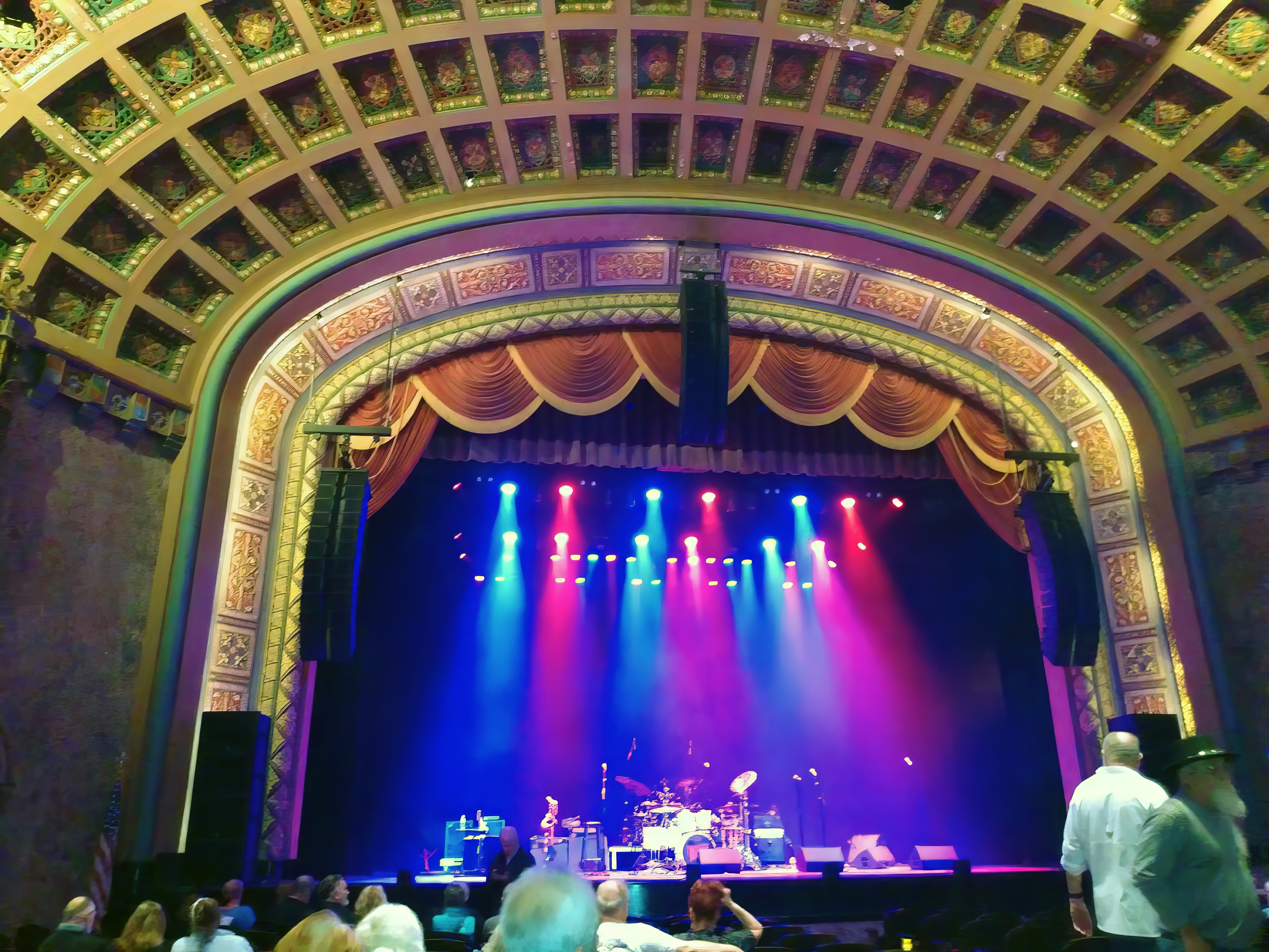
The Florida Theatre in Jacksonville, Florida, US, in 2022

The following is a list of events of the year 2022 in Florida.

== Incumbents ==
=== State government ===
- Governor: Ron DeSantis (R)

== Events ==
- March 28 – Governor Ron DeSantis signs the Florida Parental Rights in Education Act, often called the "Don't Say Gay" law by its opponents, which would prohibit instruction on sexual orientation or gender identity in school classrooms from kindergarten to grade 3 into law. it took effect on July 1.
- April 22
  - Governor Ron DeSantis signs a bill to dissolve the Reedy Creek Improvement Act, which allows Disney to self-govern its district, by June 2023. This came after the ongoing feud between DeSantis and Disney.
  - He also signs the Stop WOKE Act into law.
- August 8 – FBI search of Mar-a-Lago
- August 18 a Florida judge blocks the Stop WOKE Act, saying that it violates the First Amendment and is too vague.
- September 14 – Martha's Vineyard migrant airlift Florida governor Ron DeSantis sends approximately 50 primarily Venezuelan asylum seekers by air from San Antonio, Texas, to the island of Martha's Vineyard in Massachusetts.

=== Date unknown ===
- The Florida State Guard is reactivated. It was disbanded in 1947.

== See also ==
- 2022 in the United States
