= 2025 in Florida =

- Decades: 2000s; 2010s; 2020s
- See also: History of Florida; Historical outline of Florida; List of years in Florida; 2025 in the United States

The following is a list of events of the year 2025 in Florida.

== Incumbents ==
=== State Government ===
- Executive Branch
  - Governor: Ron DeSantis (R)
  - Lieutenant Governor: Jeanette Nuñez (R) (until February 16, 2025)
  - Lieutenant Governor: Jay Collins (R) (starting August 12, 2025)
  - Attorney General: Ashely Moody (R) (until January 21, 2025)
  - Attorney General: James Uthmeier (R) (starting February 17, 2025)
  - Chief Financial Officer: Jimmy Patronis (R) (until March 31, 2025)
  - Chief Financial Officer: Blaise Ingoglia (R) (starting July 21, 2025)
  - Commissioner of Agriculture: Wilton Simpson (R)
- Legislative Branch
  - Senate President: Ben Albritton (R)
  - House Speaker: Daniel Perez (R)
- Judicial Branch
  - Chief Justice: Carlos Muñiz

=== Chairs of Major Political Parties ===
- Republican Party of Florida: Evan Power (R)
- Florida Democratic Party: Nikki Fried (D)

== Events ==
=== January ===
- January 11 — Evan Power wins re-election as the Chair of the Republican Party of Florida.
- January 16 — Governor DeSantis appoints Ashely Moody as U.S. Senator to fill the seat vacated by Marco Rubio.
- January 21–22 — 2025 Gulf Coast blizzard across the northern part of the state, bringing record snowfall.
- January 25 — Nikki Fried wins re-election as the Chair of the Florida Democratic Party.

=== February ===
- February 16 – William Byron wins the 2025 Daytona 500, his second straight win.
- February 17 –
  - Governor DeSantis appoints James Uthmeier, the governor's former chief of staff, as the 39th Attorney General of Florida.
  - Jeanette Nuñez resigns as Florida Lieutenant Governor to become the interim president of Florida International University. Nuñez is a two-time graduate of FIU.
- February 24 – Governor DeSantis establishes the Florida Department of Government Efficiency.
- February 25 – Bryon Donalds, the U.S. House Representative for Florida's 19th congressional district, declares his candidacy for the Republican nomination in the 2026 Florida gubernatorial election, and is endorsed by President Trump.

=== March ===
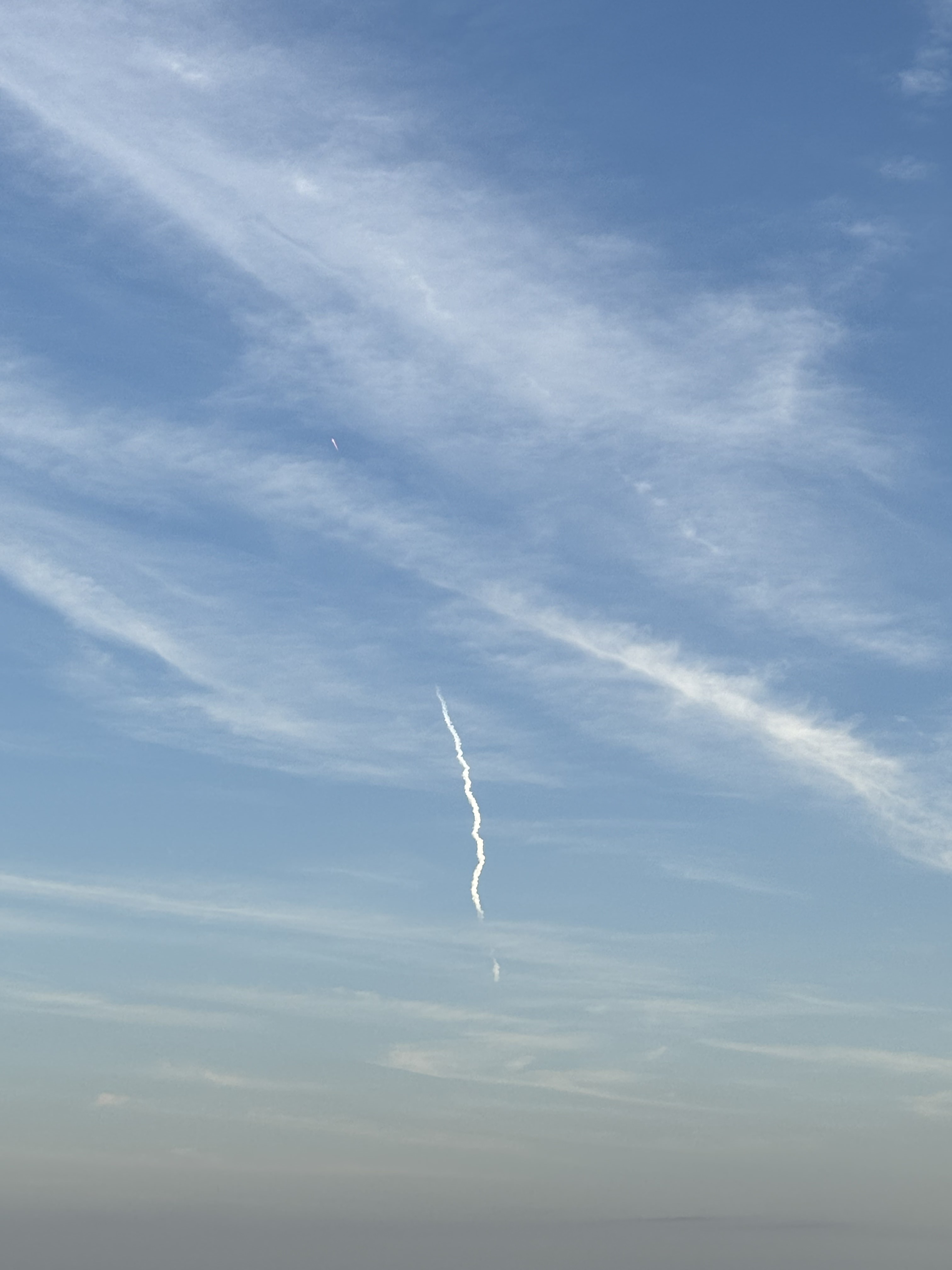
SpaceX Crew-10 capsule and contrail as seen from Ormond Beach, Florida, at 7:05 p.m. (T+00:01:45)

- March 4 – Florida Attorney General Uthmeier opens a criminal investigation into social media personalities Andrew and Tristan Tate.
- March 14 – SpaceX Crew-10 launch from Kennedy Space Center
- March 19 – A transgender woman, Marcy Rheintgen, is arrested for entering a women's bathroom at the Florida State Capitol and washing her hands. Rheintgen is believed to be the first person arrested under the Facility Requirements Based on Sex Act.
- March 29 – Nova Southeastern University beats Cal State Dominguez Hills 74–73 to win the 2025 NCAA Division II men's basketball tournament, earning their second title.

=== April ===
- April 1 –
  - 2025 Florida's 1st congressional district special election: Jimmy Patronis, Republican and Florida Chief Financial Officer, wins the special election to replace Matt Gaetz, who resigned from office the previous November for an unsuccessful nomination for U.S. Attorney General. Patronis defeated his Democratic opponent, Gay Valimont, by a margin of 56.86% to 42.26%.
  - 2025 Florida's 6th congressional district special election: Randy Fine, Republican and Florida Senator, wins the special election to replace Mike Waltz, who resigned from office the previous November to serve as U.S. National Security Advisor. Fine defeated his Democratic opponent, Josh Weil, by a margin of 56.68% to 42.69%.
- April 7 – The Florida Gators men's basketball team beats the Houston Cougars 65–63 to win the NCAA Division I men's basketball championship, their first title since 2007. Florida's Walter Clayton Jr. is named Most Outstanding Player.
- April 16 – During a traffic stop, Florida Highway Patrol troopers arrest dual Mexican-American citizen Juan Carlos Lopez-Gomez in Leon County under an immigration law that bars undocumented immigrants from entering the state, despite a judge temporarily blocking its enforcement. A DHS official says Lopez-Gomez claimed he was in the United States illegally, though he did not speak English or Spanish, only Tzotzil. Lopez-Gomez is released the following day.
- April 17 – 2025 Florida State University shooting: A student at Florida State University shoots at people near the Student Center building, killing two people and injuring five. The gunman is shot by police and arrested at the scene.

=== May ===
- May 1 – The state of Florida executes Jeffrey Hutchinson with lethal injection at the Florida State Prison. Hutchinson was sentenced to death for killing his girlfriend and her three children in 1998.
- May 22 – Universal Epic Universe opens in Orlando.
- May 29 – Over a hundred people are arrested during an Immigration and Customs Enforcement raid on a construction site in Tallahassee.

=== June ===
- June 5 – David Jolly, former Republican U.S. House Representative from Florida's 13th congressional district, declares his candidacy for the Democratic nomination in the 2026 Florida gubernatorial election.
- June 14 – Tampa Bay Sun FC wins the 2025 USL Super League final in the USL Super League's inaugural season, defeating Fort Lauderdale United FC 1–0.
- June 17 – The Florida Panthers beat the Edmonton Oilers 4–2 to win the 2025 Stanley Cup Final.
- June 18 – The Florida Board of Governors formally appoint Jeanette Nuñez as the 7th President of Florida International University.
- June 23
  - The state of Florida begins construction of an immigration detention center at the site of the former Dade-Collier Training and Transition Airport, located in the middle of the Everglades.
  - A Canadian citizen dies in ICE custody at a detention center in Miami.
- June 26 – The Miami City Commission votes 3–2 to delay the city's elections by a year, thereby extending Mayor Francis Suarez and Commissioner Joe Carollo's terms by a year. State Attorney General James Uthmeier previously warned the city against delaying elections. A judge later strikes down the postponement.

=== July ===
- July 1 – The city council of Key West votes to end their agreement between the Key West Police Department and federal immigration enforcement. Governor DeSantis threatens to suspend local officials in response. The following week, the city reverses this vote.
- July 3 – The first detainees arrive at the new detention center in the Everglades, officially called Alligator Alcatraz. Five Democratic Florida state legislators attempt to inspect the facility but are blocked by police.
- July 5 – Governor DeSantis signs HB1559 (Florida Vexatious Litigant Law) into law, amending section 68.093, Florida Statutes. HB1559 expands the courts' ability to rein in vexatious litigants, broadens the definition for vexatious conduct, and allows parties to seek relief against vexatious conduct. The law takes affect July 1, 2025.
- July 15 – Florida executes Michael Bernard Bell. It was Florida's 8th execution in 2025 and ties with the previous record reached in 1984 and in 2014.
- July 18 – State Representative Joe Casello, a Democrat from Boynton Beach, dies of a heart attack.
- July 21 – Governor DeSantis appoints Blaise Ingoglia, a Republican Florida Senator, as the 5th Chief Financial Officer of Florida. Governor DeSantis snubs President Trump's endorsed candidate, Republican Florida Senator Joe Gruters.
- July 28 – A sailboat and a barge collide in the Biscayne Bay off Miami Beach. Two girls on the sailboat, which was part of a summer camp, die at the scene. A third girl dies days later.
- July 31 — Edward James Zakrzewski II is executed for the murders of his wife and two children. He is the 9th person executed in 2025 and his execution breaks Florida's record of most executions in a year.

=== August ===
- August 12 –
  - Governor DeSantis appoints Jay Collins, a Republican Florida Senator, as the 21st Lieutenant Governor of Florida.
  - Three people in a minivan are killed near Fort Pierce in a collision with a semi-truck that made an illegal U-turn. The driver of the truck is detained by ICE, who says the driver illegally crossed the border with Mexico in 2018.
- August 20 – The Florida Department of Transportation paints over a rainbow crosswalk that was installed in Orlando as part of a memorial to the Pulse nightclub shooting victims.
- August 21 – Federal judge Kathleen Williams orders the closure of Alligator Alcatraz, citing severe environmental damage. The Trump administration is given 60 days to wind down the facility's operations.
- August 22 – Florida Senator Joe Gruters is unanimously elected as the 67th Chair of the Republican National Committee, following President Trump's endorsement.
- August 28 – Florida executes its 11th person in 2025.

=== September ===
- September 3
  - Florida Surgeon General Joseph Ladapo announces the state is moving to end all vaccine mandates.
  - Paul Renner, former Florida House Speaker, declares his candidacy for the Republican nomination in the 2026 Florida gubernatorial election.
- September 10 – The Florida First District Court of Appeals rules that Florida's Open Carry Ban is unconstitutional under the Second Amendment of the U.S. Constitution. The Court relies on the U.S. Supreme Court ruling in New York State Rifle & Pistol Association, Inc. v. Bruen.
- September 23 – Ryan Wesley Routh is found guilty of trying to assassinate then-presidential candidate Donald Trump at his West Palm Beach country club in 2024.
- September 30 — Minimum wage increases from $13 per hour to $14 per hour.

=== October ===
- October 7 – The United Football League announces the formation of the Orlando Storm.
- October 17 – British woman Sonia Exelby is found dead in Marion County; Dwain Chadwick Hall is charged with kidnap and murder.
- October 23 – Miami Heat guard Terry Rozier is charged in connection to an illegal gambling operation.

=== November ===
- November 3 – Jerry Demings, the Mayor of Orange County, declares his candidacy for the Democratic nomination in the 2026 Florida gubernatorial election.
- November 4
  - 2025 Hialeah mayoral election: 27-year-old former City Councilmember Bryan Calvo wins the mayoral election.
  - 2025 Miami mayoral election: No candidate receives 50% or more of the vote, resulting in a runoff election between Miami-Dade County Commissioner Eileen Higgins and former City Manager Emilio T. Gonzalez.
  - 2025 Miami Beach mayoral election: Incumbent mayor Steven Meiner wins reelection.
- November 8 – A driver fleeing police crashes into a bar in Tampa, killing four people.
- November 19 – Sheila Cherfilus-McCormick, a Democrat U.S. House Representative from Florida's 20th congressional district, is indicted by a grand jury on charges of stealing $5 million in funds from the Federal Emergency Management Agency.
- November 24 – James Fishback, an investor and hedge fund manager, declares his candidacy for the Republican nomination in the 2026 Florida gubernatorial election.

=== December ===
- December 2 – The board of trustees at Miami Dade College vote unanimously to transfer land owned by the college to the state of Florida to be used for building the Donald J. Trump Presidential Library.
- December 6 – Inter Miami CF wins the MLS Cup 2025, defeating Vancouver Whitecaps FC 3–1.
- December 8
  - The Florida State Seminoles win the 2025 NCAA Division I women's soccer tournament, beating the Stanford Cardinals 1–0.
  - Governor DeSantis declares the Council on American-Islamic Relations (CAIR) a foreign terrorist group.
- December 9 – 2025 Miami mayoral election: Eileen Higgins wins the run-off election against Emilio Gonzalez. Though the race is officially nonpartisan, Higgins is the first Democrat to be mayor of Miami since 1997. She is also the first woman to hold the position.
- December 27 – 2025 Pop-Tarts Bowl: The BYU Cougars beat the Georgia Tech Yellow Jackets 25–21 at the Camping World Stadium in Orlando.
- By the end of 2025, a total of 19 executions were carried out, setting the highest record number of executions in Florida in a single year.

== See also ==
- 2025 in the United States
