= 2027 in Florida =

- Decades: 2000s; 2010s; 2020s
- See also: History of Florida; Historical outline of Florida; List of years in Florida; 2027 in the United States

The following is a list of events of the year 2027 in Florida.

== Events ==
=== Planned or predicted ===
- January 2 - 2027 Citrus Bowl
- January 14 - 2027 Orange Bowl
- March 2 - 2027 Tampa mayoral election
- May 18 - 2027 Jacksonville mayoral election
- November 2 - 2027 Orlando mayoral election
