= 1845 in Florida =

- Decades: 1820s; 1830s; 1840s; 1850s; 1860s
- See also: History of Florida; Historical outline of Florida; List of years in Florida; 1845 in the United States

The following is a list of events of the year 1845 in Florida.

== Incumbents ==
=== State government ===
- Governor: William Dunn Moseley (D)

== Events ==
- March 3 – Florida is admitted as the 27th U.S. state.
- June 25 – William Dunn Moseley is elected as the first Governor of Florida.

== See also ==
- 1845 in the United States
