= 2023 in Florida =

- Decades: 2000s; 2010s; 2020s
- See also: History of Florida; Historical outline of Florida; List of years in Florida; 2023 in the United States

The following is a list of events of the year 2023 in Florida.

== Incumbents ==
=== State government ===
- Governor: Ron DeSantis (R)

== Events ==
- February 23 – Donald Dillbeck becomes the first person executed in Florida since the execution of Gary Ray Bowles in 2019 and the 100th execution since the reinstatement of the death penalty in 1976.
- April 13 – Governor Ron DeSantis signs a bill that shortened the restriction on abortion after 6 weeks of pregnancy. The bill has an exception to save the life of the woman and exceptions in the case of pregnancy caused by rape or incest until 15 weeks of pregnancy.
- April 20 – Governor DeSantis signs a bill that ended jury unanimity for Death penalty cases.
- April 28 – The Republican-led legislature passed a change to the Resign-to-run law that provided an exception to the resign-to-run law for any Florida official that runs in a presidential election.
- May 7 – Governor DeSantis signs a bill to have the death penalty for child rapists, which has been speculated to serve as a future challenge to Kennedy v. Louisiana.
- May 24
  - Governor DeSantis signs a Resign-to-run law bill into law.
  - Governor DeSantis Announces his 2024 presidential campaign.
- August 10 – The United States House Subcommittee on Government Operations and the Federal Workforce holds a televised investigative hearing on the federal government's response to and overall recovery efforts from Hurricane Ian, which struck Florida in September 2022.

== See also ==
- 2023 in the United States
