= 2024 in Florida =

- Decades: 2000s; 2010s; 2020s; 2030s
- See also: History of Florida; Historical outline of Florida; List of years in Florida; 2024 in the United States

The following is a list of events of the year 2024 in Florida.

== Incumbents ==
=== State government ===
- Governor: Ron DeSantis (R)

== Events ==
- January 8 – Peregrine Mission One, the first US lunar lander since the Apollo program, is launched at Cape Canaveral, It later suffers from a fuel leak, making it unable to complete its objective.
- January 21 – Governor Ron DeSantis ends his presidential campaign and endorses former president Donald Trump.
- January 27 – Icon of the Seas, the world's largest cruise ship, makes its maiden voyage at the PortMiami in Miami.
- February 1 – A Beechcraft Bonanza aircraft crashes into a mobile home park in Clearwater, killing the pilot and two people on the ground.
- February 8 – NASA's PACE mission is launched aboard a Falcon 9 rocket at Cape Canaveral Space Force Station to study Earth's ocean and atmosphere.
- February 9 – Hop-A-Jet Flight 823, a Bombardier Challenger 604, crashes on Interstate 75 in Collier County. Two people are killed and three others survive.
- February 15 – Odysseus, the first US lunar lander since the unsuccessful Peregrine Mission One, is launched at the Kennedy Space Center.
- April 6 – Two people, including the perpetrator, are killed and seven others are injured in a mass shooting at a bar in Doral.
- May 3 – An Okaloosa County Sheriff's deputy shoots Robert Fortson after he opens his apartment door holding a gun to his side. The deputy is later fired from the sheriff's office and charged with manslaughter.
- May 14 – Eight people are killed and 40 others are injured when a bus carrying farmworkers collides with a truck and overturns in Marion County.
- June 5 – Boeing's Starliner capsule launches its first astronaut-crewed flight into space to the International Space Station after several delays at the Cape Canaveral Space Force Station.
- June 12 –
  - The National Weather Service issues a rare Flash Flood Emergency in southern, for life-threatening flooding conditions only expected once every 500 to 1,000 years.
  - A man in Hudson fatally shoots a family of four with a 9 mm gun before burning their bodies in a fire pit. The perpetrator was identified as 25-year-old Rory John Graeme Atwood.
- June 13 – A Russian warship and a nuclear-powered submarine conduct military drills in the Caribbean Sea simulating a missile strike on enemy ships after passing near the coast of Florida in order to reach Havana, Cuba.
- June 24 – In ice hockey, the Florida Panthers defeat the Edmonton Oilers in seven games to win the 2024 Stanley Cup Final, marking their first Stanley Cup championship in franchise history. The Panthers also avoid becoming the fifth team in National Hockey League history to lose a series despite having a 3–0 series lead.
- July 14 – Twenty-seven people, including Colombian Football Federation president Ramón Jesurún, are arrested and 55 are ejected following crowd control issues at Hard Rock Stadium in Miami Gardens, before the Copa América final, where fans breached security gates at the stadium's entrance.
- August 5 – At least six people are killed in Florida, by severe weather caused by Hurricane Debby.
- August 28 – The U.S. Federal Aviation Administration temporarily grounds all SpaceX Falcon 9 launches and orders an investigation following a booster rocket fire incident at the Cape Canaveral Space Force Station.
- September 2 – The United States seizes a Dassault Falcon 900 jet used by Venezuelan president Nicolás Maduro on accusations that the purchase of the jet violated U.S. sanctions against Venezuela, and flies the jet from the Dominican Republic to Florida.
- September 15 – Trump International Golf Club shooting: Shots are fired near former US President Donald Trump at the Trump International Golf Club in West Palm Beach.
- September 26 –
  - Hurricane Helene makes landfall in Florida, as a Category 4 hurricane, with sustained winds of 140 mph (230 km/h) and a minimum central pressure of 938 millibars.
  - Tropical storm conditions occur across western Florida, with an automated weather station recording sustained winds of 54 mph (87 km/h) with gusts up to 68 mph (109 km/h) near Tampa Bay.
- October 8 – 12 Counties in Western-Central Florida issue evacuation orders due to the threat of Hurricane Milton.
- October 9 –
  - Several tornadoes are reported in Florida, including along Interstate 75, ahead of Hurricane Milton's landfall.
  - Milton makes landfall as a category 3 hurricane near Siesta Key on Florida's Western Coast.
  - The Tropicana Field roof in St. Petersburg is damaged by winds caused from Hurricane Milton.
- October 10 – At least ten people are killed in damages by tornadoes caused by Hurricane Milton.
- October 14 – SpaceX launches NASA's Europa Clipper spacecraft from the Kennedy Space Center, to study Jupiter's moon Europa, with the spacecraft expected to arrive in April 2030.

== See also ==
- 2024 in the United States
