= List of sister cities in Florida =

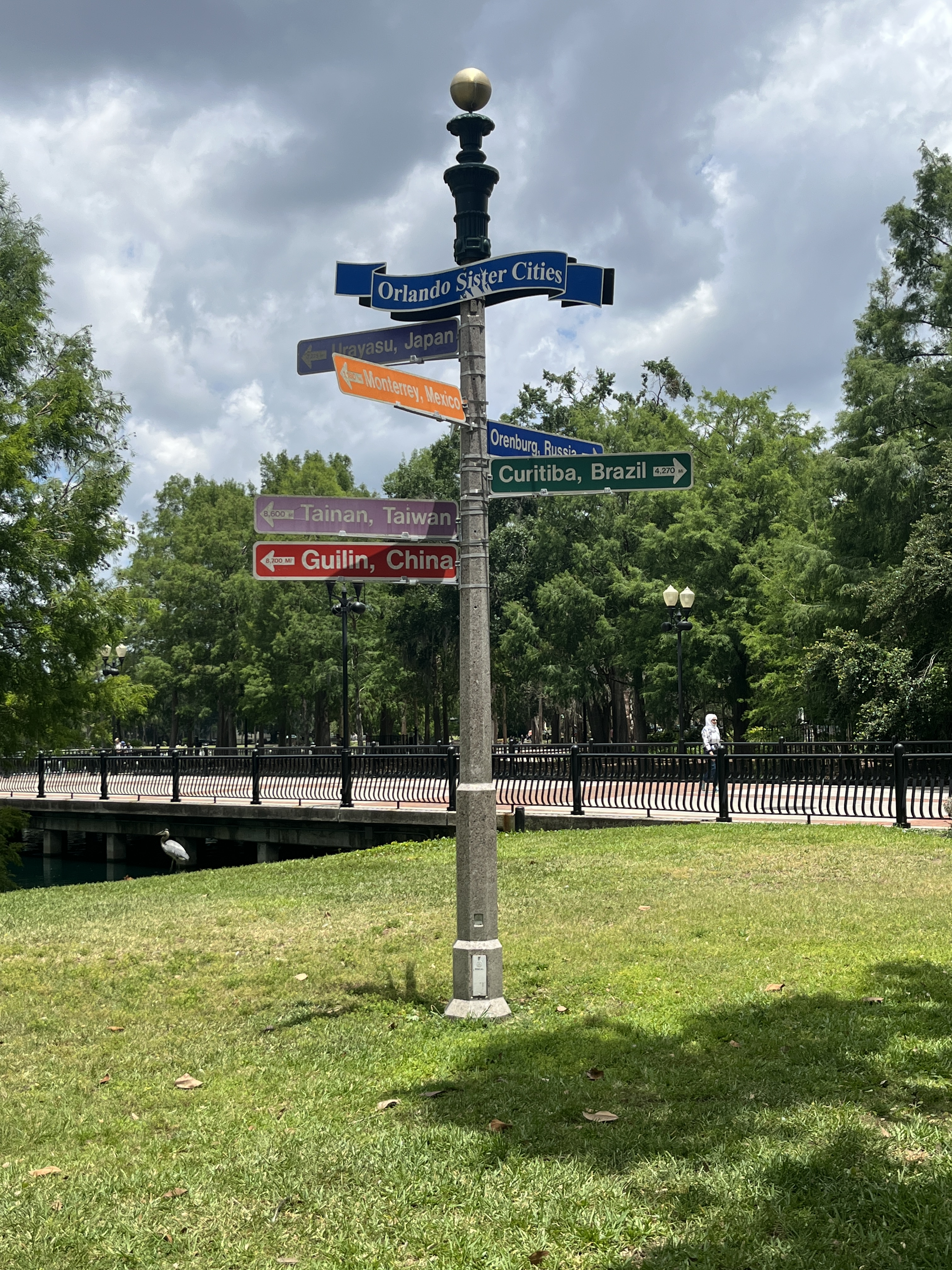
Signs denoting sister cities in Orlando, 2023

This is a list of sister states, regions, and cities in the U.S. state of Florida. Sister cities, known in Europe as twin towns, are cities which partner with each other to promote human contact and cultural links, although this partnering is not limited to cities and often includes counties, regions, states and other sub-national entities.

Florida jurisdictions often partner with foreign cities through Sister Cities International, an organization whose goal is to "promote peace through mutual respect, understanding, and cooperation". Sister cities interact with each other across a broad range of activities, from health care and education to business and the arts.

Florida has 491 sister cities as of December 2023.

== Sisters of Florida State, cities and counties ==
The lists below were compiled from the official Sister Cities International website (unless noted), corrected on orthography and region listed. Sister Cities will recognize cities only when the partnership is filed with them and remove relationships when one of the involved cities makes a formal request. Partnerships can be active, inactive (no actions taken from any of the partners for some time) or officially canceled. The list below has relationships in all three statuses. Examples of canceled partnerships are Hialeah-Managua and West Miami-León, Nicaragua, canceled because of political differences during the Sandinista regime; Hollywood-San Salvador, canceled as a protest against the Salvadoran Civil War; and Boca Raton-Spandau Borough, Berlin. Years can be approximate; in this case the number is followed by "~". The year listed will be the first date that the relationship is mentioned in media articles.

=== Florida state ===
Florida jurisdiction	Sister jurisdiction	Country	Year
State of Florida	Gyeonggi-do	South Korea	2000
State of Florida	Languedoc-Roussillon	France	1989
State of Florida	Nueva Esparta	Venezuela	1999
State of Florida	Taiwan Province	Taiwan	1992
State of Florida	Wakayama Prefecture	Japan	1995
State of Florida	Western Cape	South Africa	1995

=== Florida cities and counties ===
Florida jurisdiction	Sister jurisdiction	Country	Year
Apalachicola	Columbus, Georgia	(United States) USA	1800
Bay County	Mérida, Yucatán	Mexico	2003
Bay Harbor Islands	Marechal Deodoro, Alagoas	Brazil	2003
Bonita Springs	Grünstadt, Rhineland-Palatinate	Germany	1991
Boynton Beach	Qufu, Shandong	China	2001
Boynton Beach	Les Cayes, Sud	Haiti	2001
Bradenton	Barcarrota, Extremadura	Spain	1962
Cape Canaveral	Guidonia Montecelio, Lazio	Italy	1988
Cape Canaveral	Ithaca, Kefallinia	Greece	2005~
Cape Canaveral	Kloten, Zurich	Switzerland	2000~
Cape Canaveral	Sagres, Algarve	Portugal	2004
Cape Coral	Nyeri, Nyeri	Kenya	2014
Clearwater	Kalamaria, Thessaloniki	Greece	2001
Clearwater	Nagano, Nagano	Japan	1959
Clearwater	Wyong, New South Wales	Australia	2001~
Cocoa	Beit Shemesh, Jerusalen District	Israel	2004
Cocoa Beach	Kyustendil, Kyustendil	Bulgaria	2004
Cocoa Beach	Santa Marta, Magdalena	Colombia	1965
Cooper City	Killarney, County Kerry	(Republic of Ireland) Ireland	2003
Coral Gables	Aix-en-Provence, Provence-Alpes-Côte d'Azur	France	1997
Coral Gables	Antigua Guatemala, Antigua	Guatemala	1993
Coral Gables	Quito, Pichincha	Ecuador	1983~
Coral Springs	Paraíso, Cartago	Costa Rica	2002
Crestview	Noirmoutier-en-l'Île, Pays de la Loire	France	2001~
Daytona Beach	Bayonne, Aquitaine	France	1998
Daytona Beach	Campeche, Campeche	Mexico	1996~
Deerfield Beach	Acre, North	Israel	1994
DeLand	Belén, Guanacaste	Costa Rica	1996
Delray Beach	Miyazu, Kyoto	Japan	1977
Delray Beach	Moshi, Arusha	Tanzania	2001
Delray Beach	Aquin, Sud	Haiti	2014
Delray Beach	Pesaro, Marche	Italy	2015
Deltona	Sanford, Florida	(United States) USA	2013
Destin	Saint-Gilles-Croix-de-Vie, Pays de la Loire	France	1994
Doral	Xizhi District	Taiwan	1964
Dunedin	Stirling	Scotland, UK	1964
Dunedin	Summerside, Prince Edward Island	Canada	2000
Eatonville	Bamenda, Northwest Province	Cameroon	1976~
Fort Myers	Gomel, Gomel Oblast	Belarus	2016
Fort Lauderdale	Agogo, Asante Akim North	Ghana	2001~
Fort Lauderdale	Belo Horizonte, Minas Gerais	Brazil	2003
Fort Lauderdale	Cap-Haïtien, Nord	Haiti	2003
Fort Lauderdale	Duisburg	Germany	2003
Fort Lauderdale	Mataró	Spain	2003
Fort Lauderdale	Panama City	Panama	2001~
Fort Lauderdale	Gold Coast, Queensland	Australia	1980
Fort Lauderdale	Haifa, Haifa	Israel	2002
Fort Lauderdale	Margarita Island, Nueva Esparta	Venezuela	1997
Fort Lauderdale	La Romana, La Romana	Dominican Republic	1995
Fort Lauderdale	Mar del Plata, Buenos Aires	Argentina	2000
Fort Lauderdale	Medellín, Antioquia	Colombia	1967
Fort Lauderdale	Muğla, Muğla	Turkey	1995~
Fort Lauderdale	Quepos, Puntarenas	Costa Rica	2003
Fort Lauderdale	Rimini, Emilia-Romagna	Italy	1985
Fort Lauderdale	São Sebastião, São Paulo	Brazil	2001~
Fort Walton Beach	Quezon City, Metro Manila	Philippines	2007
Gainesville	Ho, Ghana	Ghana	2022
Gainesville	Duhok, Duhok	Iraq	2006
Gainesville	Jacmel, Sud-Est	Haiti	1998
Gainesville	Kfar Saba, Center	Israel	1998
Gainesville	Novorossiysk, Krasnodar Krai	Russia	1982
Gainesville	Rzeszów, Podkarpackie Voivodeship	Poland	2001~
Hialeah	Bucaramanga, Región Andina	Colombia	2001~
Hialeah	Cartago, Cartago	Costa Rica	1984
Hialeah	Luján de Cuyo, Mendoza	Argentina	1986
Hialeah	Managua, Managua	Nicaragua	1966
Hollywood	Baia Mare, Maramureş	Romania	2003
Hollywood	Ciudad de la Costa, Canelones	Uruguay	1996~
Hollywood	Guatemala City, Guatemala	Guatemala	1988
Hollywood	Herzliya, Tel Aviv	Israel	1988
Hollywood	Lechería, Anzoátegui	Venezuela	2003~
Hollywood	Romorantin-Lanthenay, Centre	France	1989
Hollywood	Salvaleón de Higüey, La Altagracia	Dominican Republic	2003
Hollywood	Vlorë, Vlorë	Albania	1994
Homestead	Liberia, Guanacaste	Costa Rica	1977
Homestead	Petit Goâve, Ouest	Haiti	2007
Inverness	Inverness, Highland	Scotland, UK	2001~
Jacksonville	Bahía Blanca, Buenos Aires	Argentina	1967
Jacksonville	Changwon, South Gyeongsang	South Korea	1983
Jacksonville	Murmansk, Murmansk	Russia	1975
Jacksonville	Nantes, Pays de la Loire	France	1984
Jacksonville	Nelson Mandela Bay, Eastern Cape	South Africa	2000
Jacksonville	San Juan	Puerto Rico	2009
Jacksonville	Curitiba, Paraná	Brazil	2010
Jacksonville	Yingkou, Liaoning	China	1990
Jensen Beach	Gregory Town, Eleuthera	The Bahamas	1989
Key West	Green Turtle Cay, Abaco	The Bahamas	2004
Kissimmee	Hualien, Hualien County	Taiwan	1989
Kissimmee	Miaoli	Taiwan	1989
Lake Placid	Lake Placid, New York	(United States) USA	1991
Lake Worth	Lappeenranta, South Karelia	Finland	1991~
Lakeland	Bălţi, Bălţi	Moldova	1997
Lakeland	Imabari, Ehime	Japan	1993
Lakeland	Richmond Hill, Ontario	Canada	1990
Lakeland	Jiaxing, Zheijiang	China	1993
Lakeland	Fengxian, Shanghai	China	1993
Lakeland	Chongming, Shanghai	China	1993
Lakeland	Rîbnița, Rîbnița District	Moldova (Transnistria)	1993
Lakeland	Portmore, Saint Catherine	Jamaica	1993
Lantana	Lapua, South Ostrobothnia	Finland	1979
Largo	Tosayamada, Kōchi	Japan	1969
Lauderdale-by-the-Sea	Henley-on-Thames, Oxfordshire	England, UK	2007
Lauderdale-by-the-Sea	San Isidro, Lima	Peru	2004
Lauderdale Lakes	Port-de-Paix, Nord-Ouest	Haiti	2005
Lauderhill	Chaguanas	Trinidad and Tobago	2001
Lauderhill	Gemlik, Bursa	Turkey	2002
Lauderhill	Falmouth, Trelawny	Jamaica	2002
Lauderhill	Pétionville, Ouest	Haiti	2002
Lauderhill	Suzano, São Paulo	Brazil	2002
Madeira Beach	Machico, Ilha da Madeira	Portugal	1974
Miami	Agadir, Souss-Massa-Draâ	Morocco	1995
Miami	Amman, Amman	Jordan	1995
Miami	Bogotá, Distrito Capital	Colombia	1971
Miami	Buenos Aires, Buenos Aires	Argentina	1979
Miami	Cochabamba, Cochabamba	Bolivia	1995
Miami	Ibiza, Balearic Islands	Spain	1986~
Miami	Kagoshima, Kagoshima	Japan	1990
Miami	Kaohsiung	Taiwan	1987
Miami	Lima, Lima	Peru	1977
Miami	Madrid, Madrid	Spain	1997~
Miami	Managua, Managua	Nicaragua	1991
Miami	Margherita di Savoia, Puglia	Italy	2011
Miami	Montes de Oca, San José	Costa Rica	1986~
Miami	Murcia, Murcia	Spain	1993
Miami	Nice, Provence-Alpes-Côte d'Azur	France	1986~
Miami	Palermo, Sicilia	Italy	2001~
Miami	Port-au-Prince, Ouest	Haiti	2001
Miami	Qingdao, Shandong	China	2005
Miami	Salvador, Bahia	Brazil	2006
Miami	Santiago	Chile	1986~
Miami	Santiago de Cali, Pacific Region	Colombia	1986~
Miami	Santo Domingo, Distrito Nacional	Dominican Republic	1987~
Miami	Varna, Varna	Bulgaria	1994~
Miami	Yeruham, Hadarom	Israel	2007
Miami Beach	Cozumel, Quintana Roo	Mexico	1992
Miami Beach	Fortaleza, Ceará	Brazil	2006
Miami Beach	Fujisawa, Kanagawa	Japan	1959
Miami Beach	Ica, Ica	Peru	1996
Miami Beach	Pescara, Abruzzo	Italy	1997~
Miami Beach	Nahariya, North District	Israel	1971
Miami Beach	Almonte, Andalusia	Spain	1971
Miami Beach	Brampton, Ontario	Canada	1971
Miami Beach	Basel	Switzerland	1971
Miami Beach	Santa Marta, Magdalena	Colombia	1983~
Miami-Dade County	Asunción, Asunción	Paraguay	1994
Miami-Dade County	Cabildo de Tenerife, Tenerife	Spain	1993~
Miami-Dade County	Cape Town, Western Cape	South Africa	2007
Miami-Dade County	Kingston, Surrey	Jamaica	1987~
Miami-Dade County	Maldonado, Maldonado	Uruguay	2001~
Miami-Dade County	Mendoza, Mendoza	Argentina	2001
Miami-Dade County	Monagas	Venezuela	1996
Miami-Dade County	Pereira, Risaralda	Colombia	2002
Miami-Dade County	Petit Goâve, Ouest	Haiti	2001~
Miami-Dade County	Prague	Czech Republic	2010
Miami-Dade County	Provincia di Asti, Piemonte	Italy	1986
Miami-Dade County	San Jose	Costa Rica	1990
Miami-Dade County	Santo Domingo, Distrito Nacional	Dominican Republic	1975
Miami-Dade County	São Paulo, São Paulo	Brazil	1988
Miami-Dade County	Stockholm County	Sweden	1996
Miami-Dade County	New Taipei City	Taiwan	1990
Miami-Dade County	The Bahamas	The Bahamas	1996
Miami-Dade County	Veracruz, Veracruz	Mexico	1993
Miramar	Santa Ana, Santa Ana	El Salvador	2001~
Miami Lakes	Desamparados, San José	Costa Rica	2006
Mount Dora	Forres, Moray	Scotland, UK	1990
New Port Richey	Cavalaire-sur-Mer, Provence-Alpes-Côte d'Azur	France	2001~
Niceville	Les Sables-d'Olonne, Pays de la Loire	France	2001~
North Lauderdale	Yatağan, Muğla	Turkey	2002
North Miami	Delmas, Ouest	Haiti	2008
North Miami Beach	Migdal, North	Israel	1989
North Miami Beach	San Pedro Sula, Cortés	Honduras	1989
North Miami Beach	Sosúa, Puerto Plata	Dominican Republic	1989
North Miami Beach	Gonaives, Artibonite	Haiti	1989
North Miami Beach	La Chapelle, Artibonite	Haiti	1989
North Miami Beach	Tabarre, Ouest	Haiti	1989
North Miami Beach	Accra Metropolis District, Greater Accra	Ghana	1989
North Miami Beach	Pingzhen District, Taoyuan City	Taiwan	1989
Ocala	Pisa, Toscana	Italy	2004
Ocala	Newbridge, County Kildare	(Republic of Ireland) Ireland	2008
Ocala	Sincelejo, Sucre	Colombia	1967
Opa-Locka	Isla Pucu, Cordillera	Paraguay	1996
Orlando	Curitiba, Paraná	Brazil	1996
Orlando	Guilin, Guangxi	China	1986
Orlando	Monterrey, Nuevo León	Mexico	1995
Orlando	Seine-et-Marne, Île-de-France	France	1991
Orlando	Tainan	Taiwan	1982
Orlando	Urayasu, Chiba	Japan	1989
Orlando	Valladolid, Castilla y León	Spain	2006
Oviedo	Oviedo, Spain	Spain	1877
Palatka	Palatka	Russia	1991
Palm Coast	Liberia, Guanacaste	Costa Rica	2005
Pembroke Pines	Astrakhan, Astrakhan	Russia	1996
Pensacola	Chimbote, Santa	Peru	1964
Pensacola	Escazú, San José	Costa Rica	1981
Pensacola	Gero, Gifu	Japan	1988
Pensacola	Horlivka, Donetsk Oblast	Ukraine	1981
Pensacola	Kaohsiung	Taiwan	1977
Pensacola	Miraflores, Lima	Peru	1964
Pensacola	Macharaviaya, Andalusia	Spain	1981
Pinecrest (Dade County)	Cognac, Charente	France	1964
Plant City	Portage la Prairie, Manitoba	Canada	2001~
Port St. Lucie	Putuo District, Zhoushan	China	2007
Royal Palm Beach	Călăraşi, Călăraşi	Romania	2005
Saint Augustine	Avilés, Asturias	Spain	1963
Saint Augustine	Cartagena, Bolívar	Colombia	2001~
Saint Augustine	Santo Domingo, Distrito Nacional	Dominican Republic	2001~
Saint Augustine	Menorca, Baleares Islands	Spain	2001
Saint Pete Beach	Sandown, Isle of Wight	England, UK	1999
Saint Petersburg	Takamatsu, Kagawa	Japan	1960
Saint Petersburg	Saint Petersburg, Leningrad	Russia	2003
Saint Petersburg	Figueres, Catalonia	Spain	2003
Sanford	Deltona, Florida	(United States) USA	2013
Sarasota	Dunfermline, Fife	Scotland, UK	1990
Sarasota	Perpignan, Languedoc-Roussillon	France	1994
Sarasota	Tel Mond, Center	Israel	1999
Sarasota	Vladimir, Vladimir	Russia	1994
Sarasota	Siming District, Xiamen, Fujian	China	2008
Sarasota	Mérida, Yucatán	Mexico	2010
Southwest Ranches	Clifden, Connacht	(Republic of Ireland) Ireland	2006
St. Cloud	Lynn Haven	(United States) USA	1995
Sunny Isles Beach	Netanya, Center	Israel	2005
Sunny Isles Beach	Hengchun, Pingtung County	Taiwan	2005
Sunny Isles Beach	Taormina, Sicily	Italy	2005
Sunrise	Yavne, Center	Israel	1985
Stuart	Hope Town, Abaco	(The Bahamas) Bahamas	2014
Sweetwater	Guitiriz, Lugo	Spain	1990
Sweetwater	La Paz Centro, León	Nicaragua	1996
Sweetwater	San Felipe de Puerto Plata, Puerto Plata	Dominican Republic	1983
Tallahassee	St. Maarten	Netherlands	2001~
Tamarac	Fatsa, Ordu	Turkey	2002
Tampa	Agrigento, Sicilia	Italy	1987
Tampa	Ashdod, South	Israel	2005
Tampa	Barranquilla, Atlántico	Colombia	1966
Tampa	Boca del Río, Veracruz	Mexico	2002
Tampa	İzmir, İzmir	Turkey	2001~
Tampa	Le Havre, Haute-Normandie	France	2001~
Tampa	Oviedo, Asturias	Spain	2001~
Tampa	Veracruz, Veracruz	Mexico	2002
Tampa	Porto Alegre, Rio Grande do Sul	Brazil	2002
Tarpon Springs	Kalymnos, Dhodhekanisos	Greece	2000
Tarpon Springs	Larnaca, Larnaca District	Cyprus	2000
Tarpon Springs	Halki, Dhodhekanisos	Greece	2000
Tarpon Springs	Symi, Dhodhekanisos	Greece	2000
Tavares	Xindian District, New Taipei City	Taiwan	2000
Temple Terrace	Eastleigh, Hampshire	England, UK	1989
Titusville	Ceadîr-Lunga, Gagauzia	Moldova	2001~
Titusville	Soest, Utrecht	Netherlands	1982
Titusville	Yueyang, Hunan	China	1988
Volusia County	Bayonne, Aquitaine	France	1998
Volusia County	Campeche State	Mexico	1995
West Miami	León, León	Nicaragua	1974
West Miami	Santa Cruz del Quiché, Quiché	Guatemala	1987
West Palm Beach	Tzahar Region, North	Israel	1996
Winter Haven	Sambuca di Sicilia, Sicilia	Italy	1987
