= South Apopka, Florida =

Unincorporated area in Florida, US

- Census-designated place
- Location in Orange County and the state of Florida
- Coordinates: 28°39′27″N 81°29′50″W
- Country: United States
- State: Florida
- County: Orange

Area
  - Total: 2.20 sq mi (5.70 km^{2})
  - Land: 2.12 sq mi (5.49 km^{2})
  - Water: 0.081 sq mi (0.21 km^{2})
- Elevation: 112 ft (34 m)

Population (2020)
  - Total: 6,803
  - Density: 3,209.8/sq mi (1,239.33/km^{2})
- Time zone: UTC-5 (Eastern (EST))
  - Summer (DST): UTC-4 (EDT)
- ZIP code: 32703
- Area code: 321
- FIPS code: 12-67163
- GNIS feature ID: 2402866

South Apopka is a census-designated place and an unincorporated area in Orange County, Florida, United States. Per the 2020 census, the population was 6,803. It is part of the Orlando–Kissimmee Metropolitan Statistical Area.

== Geography ==
According to the United States Census Bureau, the CDP has a total area of 2.4 square miles (6.1 km^{2}), of which 2.3 square miles (5.9 km^{2}) is land and 0.077 square miles (0.2 km^{2}) (3.72%) is water.

== Demographics ==
Historical population
Census	Pop.	Note	%±
2000	5,800		—
2010	5,728		−1.2%
2020	6,803		18.8%
U.S. Decennial Census; 2010 2020

=== Racial and ethnic composition ===
South Apopka CDP, Florida – Racial and ethnic composition Note: the US Census treats Hispanic/Latino as an ethnic category. This table excludes Latinos from the racial categories and assigns them to a separate category. Hispanics/Latinos may be of any race.
Race / Ethnicity (NH = Non-Hispanic)	Pop 2000	Pop 2010	Pop 2020	% 2000	% 2010	% 2020
White alone (NH)	1,193	986	1,039	20.57%	17.21%	15.27%
Black or African American alone (NH)	3,769	3,603	3,729	64.98%	62.90%	54.81%
Native American or Alaska Native alone (NH)	23	16	16	0.40%	0.28%	0.24%
Asian alone (NH)	3	27	49	0.05%	0.47%	0.72%
Native Hawaiian or Pacific Islander alone (NH)	6	2	2	0.10%	0.03%	0.03%
Other race alone (NH)	4	7	39	0.07%	0.12%	0.57%
Mixed race or Multiracial (NH)	62	74	167	1.07%	1.29%	2.45%
Hispanic or Latino (any race)	740	1,013	1,762	12.76%	17.69%	25.90%
Total	5,800	5,728	6,803	100.00%	100.00%	100.00%

=== 2020 census ===
As of the 2020 census, South Apopka had a population of 6,803. The median age was 34.6 years. 26.9% of residents were under the age of 18 and 12.0% of residents were 65 years of age or older. For every 100 females there were 88.7 males, and for every 100 females age 18 and over there were 83.3 males age 18 and over.

100.0% of residents lived in urban areas, while 0.0% lived in rural areas.

There were 2,255 households in South Apopka, of which 37.7% had children under the age of 18 living in them. Of all households, 35.5% were married-couple households, 18.4% were households with a male householder and no spouse or partner present, and 39.7% were households with a female householder and no spouse or partner present. About 21.7% of all households were made up of individuals and 8.3% had someone living alone who was 65 years of age or older.

There were 2,416 housing units, of which 6.7% were vacant. The homeowner vacancy rate was 1.5% and the rental vacancy rate was 7.5%.

=== 2000 census ===
As of the census of 2000, there were 5,800 people, 1,763 households, and 1,338 families residing in the CDP. The population density was 814.3/km^{2} (2,111.2/mi^{2}). There were 1,925 housing units at an average density of 270.3/km^{2} (700.7/mi^{2}). The racial makeup of the CDP was 26.81% White, 65.38% African American, 0.57% Native American, 0.07% Asian, 0.10% Pacific Islander, 5.50% from other races, and 1.57% from two or more races. Hispanic or Latino of any race were 12.76% of the population.

There were 1,763 households, out of which 36.1% had children under the age of 18 living with them, 37.4% were married couples living together, 31.5% had a female householder with no husband present, and 24.1% were non-families. 18.2% of all households were made up of individuals, and 6.1% had someone living alone who was 65 years of age or older. The average household size was 3.28 and the average family size was 3.70.

In the CDP, the population was spread out, with 34.9% under the age of 18, 10.4% from 18 to 24, 26.8% from 25 to 44, 18.8% from 45 to 64, and 9.1% who were 65 years of age or older. The median age was 29 years. For every 100 females, there were 92.6 males. For every 100 females age 18 and over, there were 84.2 males.

The median income for a household in the CDP was $25,563, and the median income for a family was $29,750. Males had a median income of $21,757 versus $18,567 for females. The per capita income for the CDP was $10,864. About 26.8% of families and 34.9% of the population were below the poverty line, including 49.3% of those under age 18 and 38.5% of those age 65 or over.
