= Anastasios Kamoutsas =

American politician

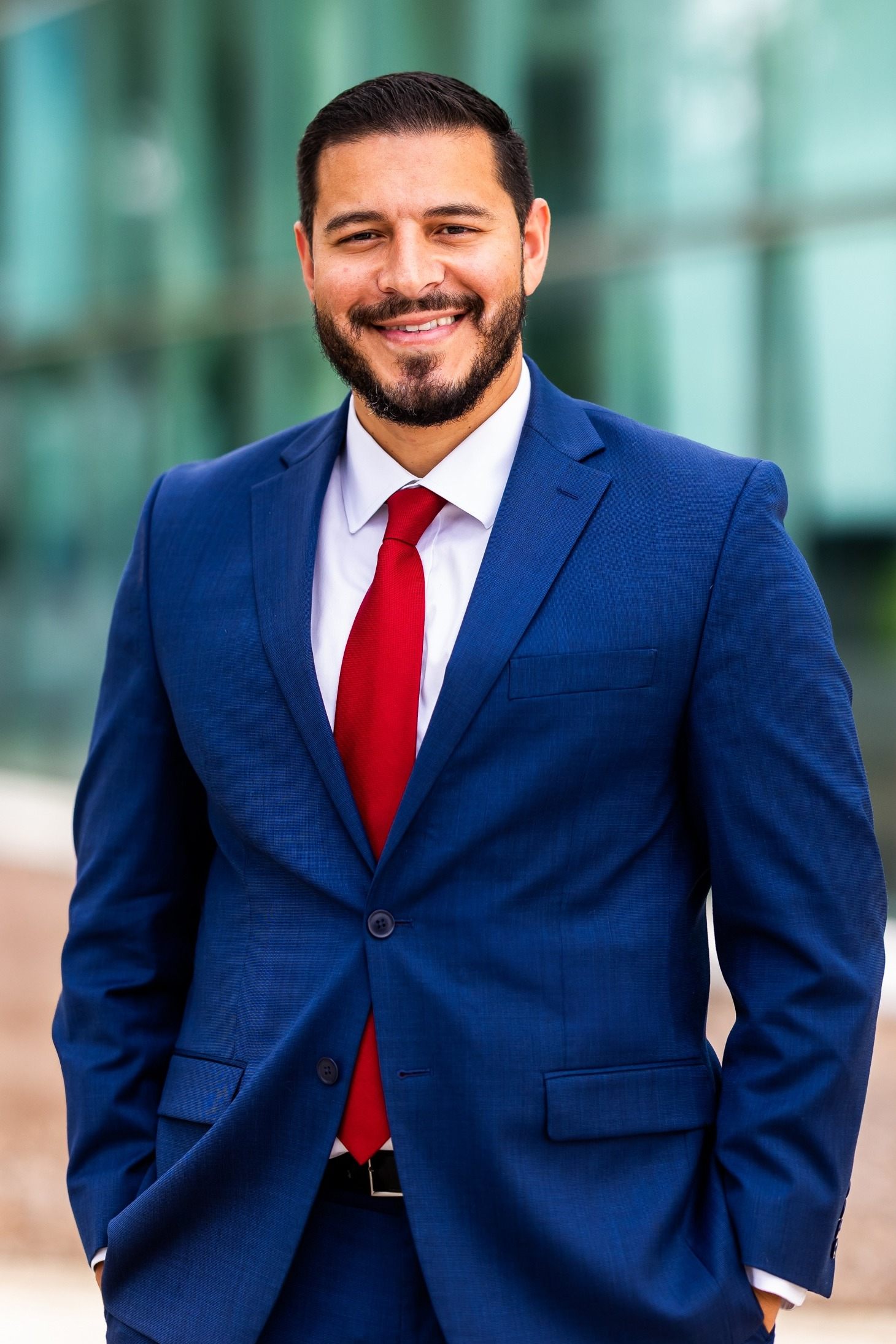
- Official portrait, 2025

6th President of Polk State College
- Incumbent
- Assumed office July 6, 2026
- Preceded by: Anne Kerr (interim)

29th Education Commissioner of Florida
- In office July 13, 2025 – July 6, 2026
- Governor: Ron DeSantis
- Preceded by: Manny Díaz Jr.
- Succeeded by: Henry Mack

Deputy Chief of Staff to the Governor of Florida
- In office August 2023 – July 2025
- Governor: Ron DeSantis

Personal details
- Born: June 10, 1988 (age 38) Los Angeles County, California, U.S.
- Party: Republican
- Spouse: Rachel Kamoutsas
- Children: 4
- Education: Florida International University (BA); Regent University (JD)
- Profession: Lawyer

Anastasios Ioannis "Stasi" Kamoutsas (born June 10, 1988) is an American lawyer who is currently the President of Polk State College. A Republican, Kamoutsas was previously deputy chief of staff to Florida governor Ron DeSantis and education commissioner of Florida.

== Background ==
Kamoutsas was born in Los Angeles County, California. He graduated from Miami Springs High School, and attended Florida International University, where he graduated with a degree in political science. He then attended Regent University School of Law, graduating with a Juris Doctor in 2014.

== Legal career ==
Kamoutsas was admitted to the Florida Bar in 2014. His first two jobs were Assistant State Attorney for the Miami-Dade Office of the State Attorney and Counsel to the Dade County Police Benevolent Association.

In 2018, Kamoutsas ran unsuccessfully for a seat on the Miami-Dade Community Council.

== Political career ==
=== Aide to Education Commissioner ===
In 2019, while Richard Corcoran was Commissioner, Kamoutsas joined the Florida Department of Education’s Office of General Counsel. One of his notable tasks was managing the legal fallout from Department efforts to defund districts with Covid mask mandates.

=== Deputy Chief of Staff for DeSantis ===
In August 2023, Kamoutsas was appointed deputy Chief of Staff to Governor Ron DeSantis.

He played an instrumental role in alleged retaliation against two Florida Department of Law Enforcement officials who disagreed with the Governor's office concerning records of publicly-funded travel by DeSantis during his presidential campaign.

=== Florida Education Commissioner ===
In June 2025, Kamoutsas was appointed Education Commissioner.

== Academic career ==
=== President of Polk State College ===
On June 3, 2026, Kamoutsas was unanimously approved by the Polk State College Board of Trustees to become the sixth president in the institution's history. He assumed office on July 6, 2026.

== Political positions ==
=== Neighborhood politics ===
In 2024, Kamoutsas was involved with a dispute in his Tallahassee neighborhood of Killearn Estates over signs opposing Amendment 4 posted in his front yard.

== Personal life ==
Kamoutsas is married to Rachel Kamoutsas, judge of the Florida Sixth District Court of Appeal. Previously, she was chief of staff to State University System of Florida chancellor Ray Rodrigues.

Both are graduates of Regent University. They have four children.
