= Black Swan manslaughter case =

2020 high-profile mariticide and trial in Florida, U.S.

- Location: Lakewood Ranch, Florida, U.S.
- Date: September 27, 2020; 6 years ago c. 7:00 p.m.
- Attack type: Mariticide by gunshot with a firearm
- Deaths: 1
- Victim: Douglas Benefield
- Perpetrator: Ashley Benefield
- Motive: Disputed: Have sole custody of their child (prosecution); Self-defense (self-declared and defense)
- Charges: Second-degree murder (charge dismissed); Manslaughter
- Verdict: Guilty
- Sentence: 20 years in prison

The Black Swan manslaughter case (Note: The trial of Ashley Benefield was known by the media news as "Black Swan murder" trial.) occurred in Lakewood Ranch, Florida, United States, on September 27, 2020. Ashley Benefield (née Byers), a former ballerina, was accused of the shooting mariticide of her estranged husband 58-year-old Douglas "Doug" Benefield. The murder trial is known by this name due to the defendant's former profession and in reference of 2010 film Black Swan. The murder and subsequent trial received national media attention.

On September 27, 2020, Doug was found shot twice in Ashley's mother's house, he died in a hospital approximately an hour later. On November 4, 2020, Ashley was charged with second-degree murder. Ashley and her defense attorney during the trial claimed that she did it in self-defense during a domestic dispute. Prosecutors argued that Ashley fabricated the abuse allegations to gain sole custody of their child.

In July 2024, a jury found Ashley guilty of manslaughter with a firearm, instead of second-degree murder. In December 2024, she was sentenced to 20 years in prison.

== Background ==
=== Douglas Benefield ===
Douglas Benefield
- Douglas "Doug" Benefield
- Born: October 2, 1961; Palo Alto, California, U.S.
- Died: September 27, 2020 (aged 58); Lakewood Ranch, Florida, U.S.
- Education: Huntsville High School; Texas A&M University (B.S., 1984)
- Occupations: Naval Flight Officer (formerly), Retired U.S. Navy intelligence officer
- Website: www.dougbenefield.info

Douglas "Doug" Glass Benefield was born on October 2, 1961, in Palo Alto, California. Doug grew up in Huntsville, Alabama, where he attended Huntsville High School. He graduated in 1984 from Texas A&M University, in College Station, Texas, with a degree in Biology. Doug was charter member of Aggie Cowboys (now Beta Theta Pi) fraternity. After college, Doug joined the Navy and was a Naval flight officer. Doug was a flight officer for 3 years in San Diego, California.

When he met Ashley, Doug had a daughter and was a widower. He lived in Charleston, South Carolina.

=== Ashley Benefield ===
Ashley Benefield (née Byers), born on December 5, 1991, was a graduate of the Maryland Youth Ballet, and a swimsuit model and ballerina.

Ashley's first marriage, on July 14, 2012 was to an active duty Marine.

In August 2016, Doug and Ashley met in Palm Beach, Florida. Ashley was 24 years old and Doug was 54 years old at the time. Doug and Ashley married 13 days later. The couple moved to Charleston, South Carolina, where they founded the American National Ballet (ANB), a ballet company which closed months after. In July 2017, Ashley became pregnant and gave birth in March 2018.

== Abuse accusations ==
According to some witnesses and reports, the couple had tensions and fights. On one occasion, Doug fired a gun at the ceiling during an argument. One of Doug's close friends said that he told him: “I did the dumbest thing I've ever done in my life," referring to that event. Due to marital and pregnancy complications, Ashley moved with her mother to Florida until she gave birth. When Ashley gave birth, she asked for full custody of her baby and she did not allow Doug to visit or have contact with their child. On March 15, 2018, Doug said in an emailed letter that he wanted to be a part of the child's birth and life.

Ashley filed domestic violence claims in court, alleging that Doug was a "manipulative", "controlling" and "abusive" man. She also accused him of attempting to poison her and of poisoning Doug's late wife. However, the judge considered that Ashley's story didn't possess a "scintilla of truth". In March 2020, Doug then wrote an email to the sheriff's office accusing Ashley of having a "split personality". On May 6, 2020, Ashley filed a restraining order against Doug. Shortly after, Ashley planned to move with her mother to Maryland. Around that time, Doug filed for divorce, although he was still in love with her and wanted to live with Ashley in Maryland.

== Shooting ==
On September 27, 2020, in Lakewood Ranch, Florida, Ashley with the help of Doug was packing a U-Haul truck for the move. Ashley's mother, Alicia, took her granddaughter to a park, leaving Doug and Ashley alone in her house. Around 7 p.m, the couple started an argument. Ashley claims Doug struck her in the head and he tried to keep her in a room. Ashley claims she feared for her life, shot Doug multiple times in self-defense, and then arrived at a neighbor's house. The neighbor called 911.

When the police and paramedics arrived at the residence, they found Doug shot twice, once in the leg and once in the arm. That second bullet traveled into his chest cavity. Doug died one hour later at a hospital.

== Criminal proceedings ==
=== Pre-trial ===
The State of Florida vs. Ashley Benefield
- Case Number 2020CF003014AX
- Court: Manatee County Judicial Center
- Full case name: State of Florida v. Ashley Benefield
- Decided: July 30, 2024
- Verdict: Guilty on one count of manslaughter

Court membership
- Judge sitting: Matt Whyte

Case opinions
- Decision by: Jury verdict

On November 4, 2020, Ashley was charged with second-degree murder and without the right to bail. In July 2023, a judge refused to dismiss the charges following a two-day Stand Your Ground hearing.

=== Trial ===
On July 23, 2024, the trial began in Manatee County Judicial Center. The prosecution was represented by Assistant State's Attorney Suzanne O'Donnell and Ashley was represented by defense attorney Neil Taylor.

The prosecution explained that this was a case where "the mother already knew she wanted to be a single mother and had no intention of giving the father visitation rights". The prosecution argued that Ashley fabricated the abuse allegations to gain sole custody.

Ashley and her defense attorney Neil Taylor argued that she acted in self-defense. Taylor also mentioned that the authorities did not give her help when she reported her husband's abuse, although there was a restraining order. Ashley testified that she acted in self-defense and that she feared for her life. Ashley's defense attorney argued that she suffers from “battered woman syndrome”.

=== Conviction ===
After six days of trial, on July 30, 2024, a jury found Ashley guilty of the lesser offense of manslaughter with a firearm. On December 3, 2024, Ashley was sentenced to 20 years in prison, followed by 10 years of probation.

The killing was deemed not to have been premeditated; however, the exact motives that precipitated the murder remain unclear.

== Reactions ==
The murder and Ashley's imprisonment attracted national media. When the murder trial was presented, it received major media coverage, becoming a high-profile trial in Florida.

The case is known by the media as the "Black Swan murder", in reference of the 2010 film Black Swan, a story of a dancer whose quest for perfection leads to mental instability.

== See also ==
- Murder in Florida
- Murder of Dee Dee Blanchard
