= 2021 Conservative Political Action Conference =

US political meeting

- Date: February 25–28, 2021
- Venue: Hyatt Regency Orlando
- Location: Orlando, Florida, United States
- Website: cpac.conservative.org

The 2021 Conservative Political Action Conference was the annual event of the Conservative Political Action Conference (CPAC), hosted by the American Conservative Union. It was held at the Hyatt Regency Orlando in Orlando, Florida, from February 25 to February 28, 2021. The event was headlined by Donald Trump, with many speakers and panels throughout the conference.

== President Trump's address ==
Trump addressed the conference one month after departing office, when on January 20, 2021, Joe Biden was inaugurated as president. He claimed that he had won the 2020 presidential election and suggested he may run for president in 2024.

== Entire speakers list ==
The entire lineup of speakers by day listed below:

Friday: Ron DeSantis, Mike Lee, Scott Walker, James Lankford, Pam Bondi, Ted Cruz, Mo Brooks, Madison Cawthorn, Tom Cotton, Marsha Blackburn, Matt Gaetz, Rick Scott, Josh Hawley, and Donald Trump Jr

Saturday: Ken Paxton, Ric Grenell, Mike Pompeo, Bill Hagerty, Robert Lighthizer, Devin Nunes, Cynthia Lummis, Burgess Owens, Darrell Issa, Andy Biggs, Lauren Boebert, Kevin McCarthy, and Kristi Noem

Sunday Sarah Huckabee Sanders, Mike Huckabee, Larry Kudlow, and President Donald Trump

== Stage design controversy ==
The stage at the Conservative Political Action Conference (CPAC) held at the Hyatt Regency hotel in Orlando, Florida drew outrage as the picture of it went viral on the Internet and social media users compared the shape of the stage to the othala rune used by Nazis during World War II. The rune was used as insignia for two units in the Waffen-SS. CPAC's organizers denied any connection between the stage design and Nazi ideology, calling the accusations “outrageous and slanderous”.

=== Reactions ===
The controversy drew a lot of attention Internet users debated the issue and Snopes, the famous fact-checking website, suggested it was "unproven".

Design Foundry, the firm hired to create the stage took responsibility for the design and in an interview for The Forward said they “had no idea that the design resembled any symbol, nor was there any intention to create something that did.”

Hyatt Hotels faced calls for a boycott in response to the controversy. The hotel chain said the organizers of the event insisted the stage was not purposefully designed to look like a symbol of hate. Hyatt Hotels went on to call the symbols of hate abhorrent. Law in the United States does not allow venues to discriminate based on politics and if a hotel asked to approve set designs it would open "Pandora’s box of problems".

Holocaust scholar Deborah Lipstadt said in an interview for The Times of Israel that she believes the similarity was accidental, "but the fact that nobody noticed is a very big oops."
