= David J. Rush =

Former CIA executive accused of theft

- Occupation: CIA officer
- Years active: 2009–2026
- Employer: Central Intelligence Agency
- Military career
- Allegiance: United States
- Branch: United States Navy; United States Navy Reserve
- Service years: 1997–2015
- Rank: Lieutenant

David J. Rush is an American former intelligence official and former member of the United States Navy Reserve. In 2026, he became the subject of national media attention after being charged by federal authorities in connection with the alleged theft of government property, including gold bars and foreign currency, from the Central Intelligence Agency (CIA).

== Military service ==
Rush joined the United States Navy in 1997 as an information systems technician. He later became an officer in the United States Navy Reserve after receiving his commission in 2004. He served until 2015 and was honorably discharged with the rank of lieutenant.

According to federal investigators, Rush later made a number of false claims regarding his military career, including assertions that he had served as a Navy pilot and attended advanced military aviation training programmes.

== Intelligence career ==
Court filings released in 2026 allege that Rush obtained positions within the government using falsified educational and professional credentials.

Federal investigators stated that Rush falsely claimed to hold academic qualifications from institutions including Clemson University and Rensselaer Polytechnic Institute. Authorities also alleged that he misrepresented aspects of his military service and professional experience during security clearance and employment processes.

Rush was granted a Top Secret/Sensitive Compartmented Information (TS/SCI) security clearance after applying in 2009, and entered the Senior Executive Service in 2018. He worked as a CIA liaison with the Defense Department for a nuclear submarine program. Rush had a close professional relationship with deputy secretary of defense Steve Feinberg, who praised his performance and recommended him for jobs. Feinberg was interviewed in connection to the case, but was not accused of wrongdoing. In the Senior Executive Service, Rush claimed to be running a special access program which necessitated the purchase of various luxury items, cash, gold, and other valuables.

== Federal investigation ==
In May 2026, federal authorities announced criminal charges against Rush following an internal CIA investigation and subsequent FBI inquiry.

According to an affidavit filed by FBI Special Agent Matthew T. Johnson, investigators alleged that between late 2025 and early 2026, Rush requested substantial quantities of gold bullion and foreign currency for purported operational purposes. Authorities alleged that the monetary and gold assets were instead diverted for personal possession.

On 18 May 2026, FBI agents executed a search warrant at Rush's residence in Ashburn, Virginia. According to court documents, agents recovered:

- 303 one-kilogram gold bars valued at more than US$40 million.
- Approximately US$2 million in cash
- More than 30 luxury watches, including several Rolex watches

Investigators also alleged that Rush fraudulently claimed military leave benefits after his discharge from the Navy Reserve, resulting in approximately US$77,000 in improper payments.

== Criminal Case ==
Rush was arrested on 19 May 2026 and charged in the United States District Court for the Eastern District of Virginia.

Federal prosecutors charged him with theft of public money and making false statements on government records. Additional investigations into his employment history and security clearance documentation were ongoing as of May 2026.

Rush has denied wrongdoing.

In September 2026, federal prosecutors and Rush's attorney told the court that they had reached a plea agreement in principle that would resolve the case before an indictment. The parties requested an extension of the deadline for prosecutors to file an indictment until October 8 2026, citing ongoing issues involving classified material.

On October 6, 2026, Rush pleaded guilty to wire fraud.

== See also ==
- Central Intelligence Agency
