= Arrest of Marcy Rheintgen =

2025 transgender legal case in Florida, US

Coordinates: 30.43811°N 84.28160°W

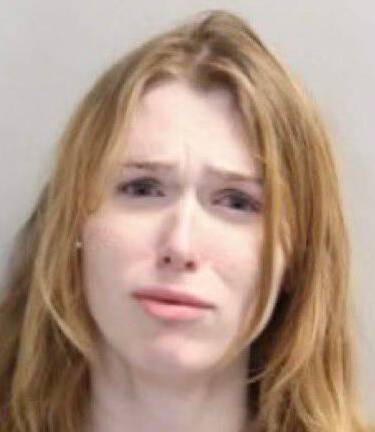
- Mugshot of Rheintgen following the arrest
- Date: March 15, 2025; 19 months ago
- Location: Florida State Capitol, Tallahassee, Florida, United States
- Cause: Rheintgen's entry of a women's bathroom as a transgender woman
- Participants: Florida Capitol Police
- Charges: Second-degree trespassing
- Verdict: Case dissmissed; charge against Rheintgen dropped due to prosecution failures

On March 19, 2025, American college student Marcy Rheintgen was arrested and detained overnight by Florida Capitol Police for washing her hands in a women's bathroom in the Florida State Capitol. She was arrested under the state anti-trans bathroom law, Facility Requirements Based on Sex Act, as she used the bathroom as a transgender woman. The arrest is believed to be the first under the law, and it was criticized by LGBTQ rights activists.

Rheintgen used the bathroom in protest of the law and had informed lawmakers of the protest a week prior. After being arrested, she was charged with a second-degree trespassing misdemeanor (punishable by up to 60 days in prison) and was released after 24 hours for pretrial release. In June 2025, the charge was dropped and the case was dismissed due to prosecution failures.

== Background ==
Marcy Rheintgen (born 2004/2005) is a college student and Illinois resident; she has called Florida her "home away from home". Although Ellenbogen's reporting described her as a moderate conservative, Rheintgen later clarified that she holds centrist values.

One week before her arrest, Rheintgen sent around 160 printed letters to Florida lawmakers informing them she planned to use the specific restroom in the Florida State Capitol on March 19 in protest of the Facility Requirements Based on Sex Act. She also included a photograph of herself for identification. She wrote in the letter, "I know that you know in your heart that transgender people are human too, and you can't arrest us away."

== Arrest and dismissal ==
She was accompanied to the Capitol building by Tampa Bay Times reporter Romy Ellenbogen. Outside the bathroom, two police officers warned her not to enter. She told the police that she was visiting to "break the law", then entered the bathroom and washed her hands. The police handcuffed and arrested her inside the bathroom after less than 60 seconds. They had told Rheintgen they planned to issue a Notice to Appear in court, but they arrested her, stating that she did not meet the criteria for a Notice to Appear.

Rheintgen was taken to Leon County Detention Facility, where she was detained overnight. She was released after 24 hours for pretrial release. She was charged with a second-degree trespassing misdemeanor, punishable by up to 60 days in jail. She appeared in court in May 2025. In June 2025, charges were dropped and the case was dismissed as prosecutors failed to meet the deadline for filing charging documents.

== Reactions ==
Rheintgen's arrest was criticized the following week by executive director Nadine Smith of Equality Florida. Smith stated that the implementation of the law did not promote public safety, but abuse against trans women; "it's about cruelty, humiliation, and the deliberate erosion of human dignity... If you can't safely or legally use a restroom, your time in any public space is limited. That's the point". Jon Harris Maurer, Public Policy Director of Equality Florida stated, "weaponizing bathroom access in a place like the State Capitol is an antidemocratic effort to block them from directly participating in government while simultaneously stripping their rights behind closed doors."

== See also ==
- LGBTQ rights in Florida
- Transgender rights in the United States
