= Stop WOKE Act =

Florida state law

Individual Freedom Act

Florida Legislature
- Enacted by: Florida House of Representatives
- Enacted by: Florida Senate
- Signed by: Ron DeSantis
- Signed: April 22, 2022
- Effective: July 1, 2022

Legislative history

Initiating chamber: Florida House of Representatives
- Introduced by: Bryan Avila
- Passed: February 24, 2022
- Voting summary: 74 Florida Representatives voted for; 41 Florida Representatives voted against

Revising chamber: Florida Senate
- Passed: March 10, 2022
- Voting summary: 24 Florida Senators voted for; 15 Florida Senators voted against
- Status: Not fully in force

The Stop WOKE Act, also known as the Stop Wrongs to Our Kids and Employees Act (a backronym of woke) and redubbed the Individual Freedom Act, is a 2022 Florida state law that restricts schools and businesses from promoting certain concepts related to race, gender, racism, and social privilege, while still allowing discussion of them. It does not prohibit Florida educational institutions and businesses from discussing whether race, gender, and systemic racism intersect with various social systems, including legal, healthcare, education, and so forth. Still, it does prohibit compelled belief or instructional endorsement of specific concepts related to systemic racism or intersectionality. Violations could expose institutions to complaints and potential funding consequences, but the law does not mandate termination or automatic loss of funding.

After passing both chambers of the Republican-controlled Florida Legislature along party lines, it was signed by Governor Ron DeSantis on April 22, 2022, and entered into effect on July 1. DeSantis framed the bill as opposing what he described as "woke indoctrination", though the statute does not mention critical race theory. Critics of the law described it as whitewashing and an attack on the First Amendment. The law prohibits instruction that could compel students to feel guilt or responsibility for past injustices due to race or sex "guilt" and "shame" from students based on their race and gender.

In August 2022, federal judge Mark E. Walker ruled that the provisions governing workplace diversity training violated employers’ First Amendment rights. In March 2024, the U.S. Eleventh Circuit Court of Appeals affirmed Walker's workplace ruling, but the law’s K–12 provisions remained in effect as they were not part of the injunction. Following the federal appellate court's ruling, Judge Walker granted a permanent injunction against the law's workplace provisions in July 2024.

In November 2022, Judge Walker issued an injunction blocking enforcement of the law's higher-education provisions on free speech grounds, calling the law "positively dystopian." In July 2026, the Eleventh Circuit affirmed Walker's decision. Judge Britt C. Grant wrote the court's opinion, stating that the law is a "breathtaking assertion of power to ban unpopular ideas from public discourse." Judge Barbara Lagoa dissented, arguing that the First Amendment "does not compel all viewpoints to be worthy of state-sponsored endorsement."

One academic study using an event-study methodology found a short-term decline in the stock value of Florida-based firms following the Act’s announcement, though these findings reflect correlation rather than established causation.

== See also ==
- Florida Parental Rights in Education Act
