= Outline of Florida =

U.S. state

The flag of Florida

The seal of Florida

The location of the state of Florida in the United States of America

The following outline is provided as an overview of and topical guide to the U.S. state of Florida:

Florida – third most populous and the southeasternmost of the 50 states of the United States of America. Florida lies between the Gulf of Mexico and the North Atlantic Ocean. The Territory of Florida joined the Union as the 27th state on March 3, 1845. Florida joined the Confederate States of America during the American Civil War from 1861 to 1865, but was readmitted to the Union in 1868.

== General reference ==
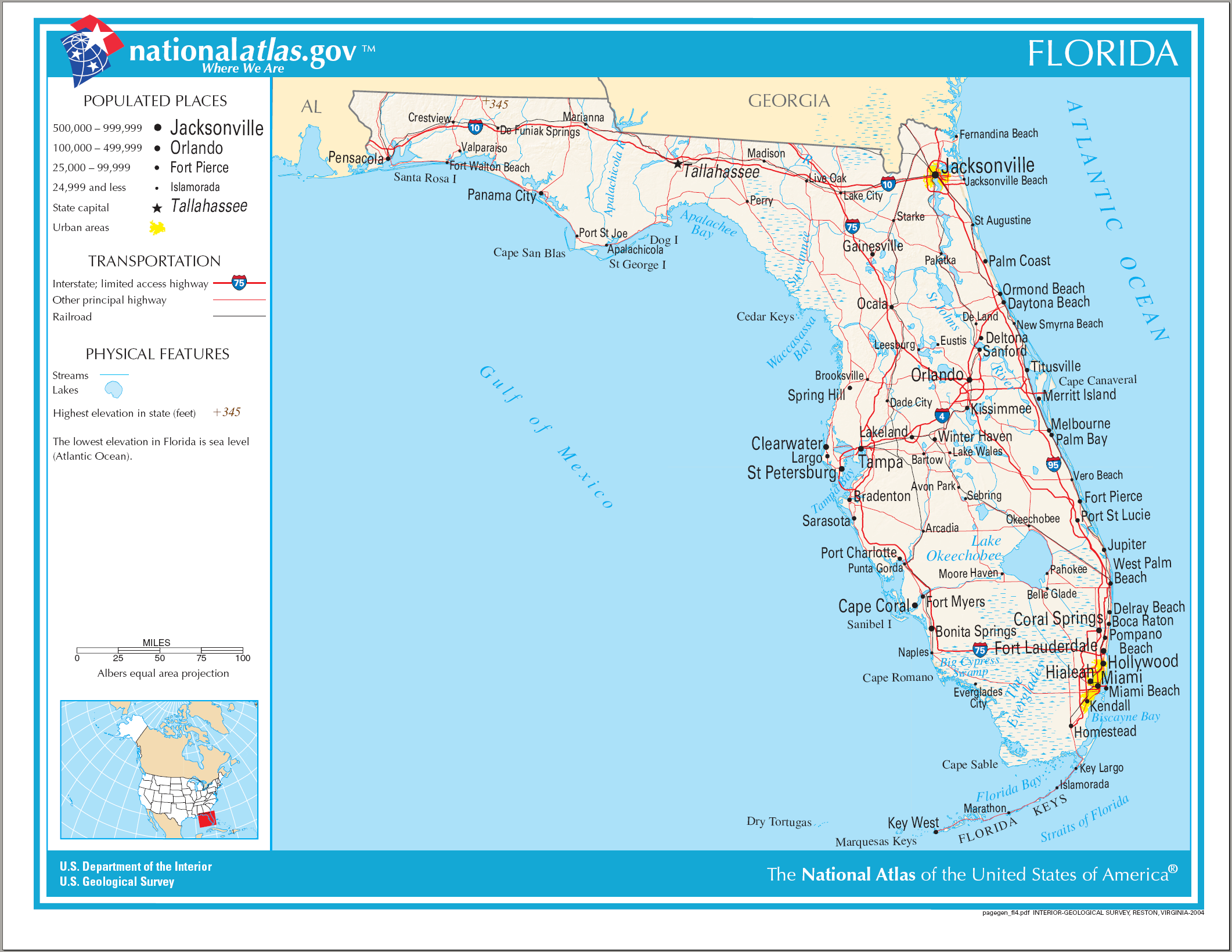
An enlargeable map of the state of Florida

- Names
  - Common name: Florida
    - Pronunciation: /ˈflɒrɪdə/
  - Official name: State of Florida
  - Abbreviations and name codes
    - Postal symbol: FL
    - ISO 3166-2 code: US-FL
    - Internet second-level domain: .fl.us
  - Nicknames
    - Sunshine State (currently used on license plates)
    - Others include:
      - Alligator State
      - Everglade State
      - Flower State
      - God's Waiting Room
      - Gulf State
      - La Florida
      - Orange State
      - Peninsula State or Peninsular State
- Adjectival: Florida
- Demonym: Floridian

== Geography of Florida ==
Geography of Florida

- Florida is: a U.S. state, a federal state of the United States of America
- Location
  - Northern Hemisphere
  - Western Hemisphere
    - Americas
      - North America
        - Anglo America
        - Northern America
          - United States of America
            - Contiguous United States
              - Eastern United States
                - East Coast of the United States
                - South Atlantic States
                - Southeastern United States
              - Southern United States
                - Deep South
                  - Gulf Coast of the United States
- Population of Florida: 18,801,310 (2010 U.S. Census)
- Area of Florida
- Atlas of Florida

=== Places in Florida ===
Places in Florida

- Historic places in Florida
  - Ghost towns in Florida
  - National Historic Landmarks in Florida
  - National Register of Historic Places listings in Florida
    - Bridges on the National Register of Historic Places in Florida
- National Natural Landmarks in Florida
- National parks in Florida
  - Everglades National Park
  - Dry Tortugas National Park
  - Biscayne National Park
- State parks in Florida

=== Environment of Florida ===
Environment of Florida

- Climate of Florida
- Geology of Florida
- Protected areas in Florida
  - State forests of Florida
- Superfund sites in Florida
- Wildlife of Florida
  - Flora of Florida
    - Endemic
    - Florida mangroves
    - List of invasive plant species in Florida
    - Orchids
    - Trees
  - Fauna of Florida
    - Birds of Florida
    - Mammals of Florida
    - Reptiles of Florida

==== Natural geographic features of Florida ====
- Highest points of Florida
- Islands of Florida
- Rivers of Florida

=== Regions of Florida ===
- Central Florida
- Eastern Florida
- Southern Florida
  - Southwestern Florida
- Western Florida

==== Administrative divisions of Florida ====
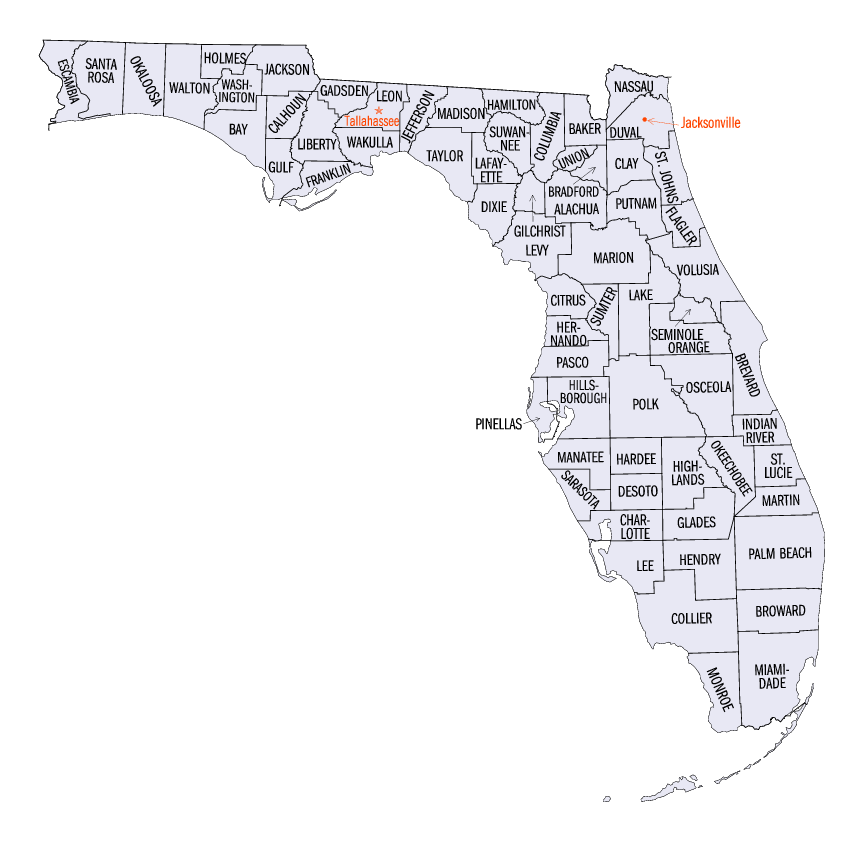
An enlargeable map of the 67 counties of the state of Florida

- The 67 counties of the state of Florida
  - Municipalities in Florida
    - Cities in Florida
      - State capital of Florida: Tallahassee
      - City nicknames in Florida
      - Sister cities in Florida
    - Towns in Florida

=== Demography of Florida ===
Demographics of Florida

== Government and politics of Florida ==
Politics of Florida

- Form of government: U.S. state government
- Florida's congressional delegations
- Florida State Capitol
- Elections in Florida
  - Electoral reform in Florida
- Political party strength in Florida
- Florida and the Declaration of Independence

=== Branches of the government of Florida ===
Government of Florida

==== Executive branch of the government of Florida ====
- Governor of Florida
  - Lieutenant Governor of Florida
  - Secretary of State of Florida
  - State Treasurer of Florida
- State departments
  - Florida Department of Transportation

==== Legislative branch of the government of Florida ====
- Florida Legislature (bicameral)
  - Upper house: Florida Senate
  - Lower house: Florida House of Representatives

==== Judicial branch of the government of Florida ====
Courts of Florida

- Supreme Court of Florida

=== Law and order in Florida ===
Law of Florida

- Capital punishment in Florida
  - Individuals executed in Florida
- Constitution of Florida
- Crime in Florida
- Gun laws in Florida
- Law enforcement in Florida
  - Law enforcement agencies in Florida
- Same-sex marriage in Florida

=== Military in Florida ===
- Florida Air National Guard
- Florida Army National Guard

== History of Florida ==
History of Florida

=== History of Florida, by period ===
The location of the state of Florida in the United States of America

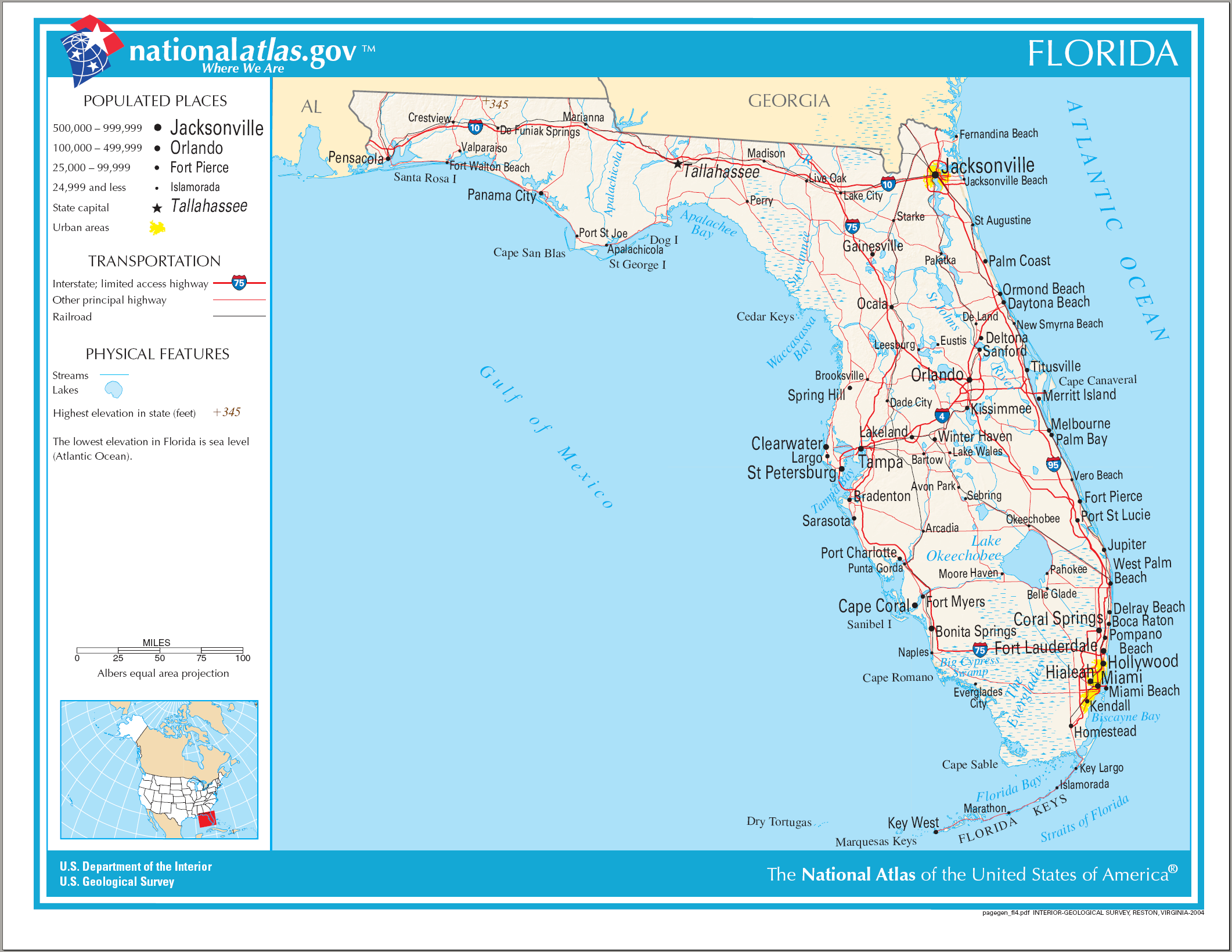
An enlargeable map of the state of Florida

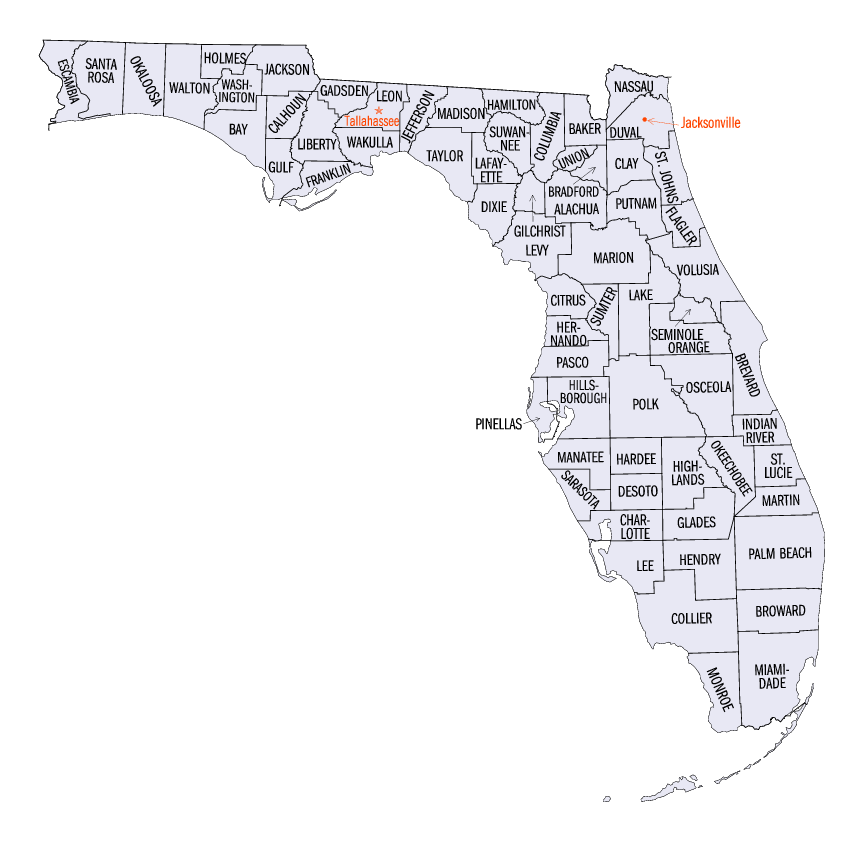
An enlargeable map of the 67 counties of the state of Florida

- Prehistory of Florida
  - Indigenous people of the Everglades region
- Maritime history of Florida since 1513
  - On Easter Sunday, April 2, 1513, a Spanish expedition led by Juan Ponce de León lands on a huge inhabited island (later determined to be a continental peninsula) that he names for Pascua Florida (the Land of Flowers, now Florida).
- Spanish settlement of Ochuse, 1559–1560
  - A Spanish expedition led by Tristán de Luna y Arellano establishes a settlement at Santa Maria de Ochuse (Pensacola, Florida) on August 15, 1559.
    - A hurricane destroys most of the Ochuse settlement five weeks later on September 19, 1559.
- French colony of Caroline, 1564–1565
  - Jean Ribault explores the Atlantic coast of Florida for France in 1562.
  - French Huguenots led by René Goulaine de Laudonnière establish Fort de la Caroline on June 22, 1564
  - Spanish Governor Pedro Menéndez de Avilés captures Fort de la Caroline on September 20, 1565
    - Governor Menéndez orders the execution of 140 Huguenots from Fort de la Caroline on September 29, 1565
    - Governor Menéndez orders the execution of Jean Ribault and 350 shipwrecked Huguenots on October 12, 1565
- Spanish territory of Florida, 1565–1763
  - Spanish Governor Pedro Menéndez de Avilés establishes settlement at San Agustín (Saint Augustine) on September 8, 1565
    - Governor Menéndez orders captured Fort de la Caroline rebuilt as Fuerte San Mateo on September 29, 1565
  - French raiders led by Dominique de Gourgues destroy Fuerte San Mateo and murder all its defenders on April 27–28, 1567
  - Treaty of Paris of 1763
- British Colony of East Florida, 1763–1783
- British Colony of West Florida, 1763–1783
  - Treaty of Paris of 1783
- Spanish province of Florida Oriental, 1783–1821
- Spanish province of Florida Occidental, 1783–1821
  - Treaty of San Lorenzo of 1795
  - Republic of West Florida, 1810
  - First Seminole War, 1817–1818
  - Adams–Onís Treaty of 1819
- Territory of Florida, 1822–1845
  - Trail of Tears, 1830–1838
  - Second Seminole War, 1835–1842
- State of Florida becomes 27th state admitted to the United States of America on March 3, 1845
  - Mexican–American War, April 25, 1846 – February 2, 1848
  - American Civil War, April 12, 1861 – May 13, 1865
    - Third state to declare secession from the United States of America on January 10, 1861
    - Founding state of the Confederate States of America on February 8, 1861
    - Florida in the American Civil War
  - Florida in Reconstruction, 1865–1868
    - Third former Confederate state readmitted to the United States of America on June 25, 1868
    - Compromise of 1877 removes final U.S. military forces from the former Confederate states
  - Everglades National Park established on December 6, 1947
  - Biscayne National Park established on June 28, 1980
  - Dry Tortugas National Park established on October 26, 1992

=== History of Florida, by region ===
- Counties
  - Brevard
  - Leon
- Cities
  - Fort Lauderdale
  - Jacksonville
  - Miami
  - Pensacola
  - Tallahassee
  - Tampa

=== History of Florida, by subject ===
- Maritime history of Florida
- History of universities in Florida
  - Florida State University
  - University of Florida

== Culture of Florida ==
Culture of Florida

- Museums in Florida
- Religion in Florida
  - Catholic Church - largest single denomination in Florida
  - The Church of Jesus Christ of Latter-day Saints in Florida
  - Episcopal Diocese of Florida
- Scouting in Florida
- State symbols of Florida
  - Flag of the State of Florida
  - Great Seal of the State of Florida

=== The arts in Florida ===
- Music of Florida

=== Sports in Florida ===
Sports in Florida

- Professional sports teams in Florida

== Economy and infrastructure of Florida ==
Economy of Florida

- Communications in Florida
  - Newspapers in Florida
  - Radio stations in Florida
  - Television stations in Florida
- Health care in Florida
  - Hospitals in Florida
- Transportation in Florida
  - Airports in Florida
  - Canals in Florida
    - Bayshore Canal
    - Caloosahatchee River
    - Cross-Florida Barge Canal
    - Okeechobee Waterway
    - Tamiami Canal
  - Rail in Florida
    - Brightline
    - Tri-Rail
  - Roads in Florida
    - Alligator Alley
    - Tamiami Trail
    - Interstate Highways
    - State highways
    - Toll Roads
    - U.S. Highways

== Education in Florida ==
Education in Florida

- Schools in Florida
  - School districts in Florida
    - High schools in Florida
  - Colleges and universities in Florida
    - Florida State University
    - University of Florida

== See also ==
- Topic overview:
  - Florida
  - Index of Florida-related articles
