= History of Florida =

The history of Florida can be traced to when the first Paleo-Indians began to inhabit the peninsula as early as 14,000 years ago. They left behind artifacts and archeological remains. Florida's written history begins with the arrival of Europeans; the Spanish explorer Juan Ponce de León in 1513 made the first textual records. The state received its name from that conquistador, who called the peninsula La Pascua Florida in recognition of the verdant landscape and because it was the Easter season, which the Spaniards called Pascua Florida (Festival of Flowers).

This area was the first mainland realm of the United States to be settled by Europeans, starting in 1513. Since then Florida has had many waves of colonization and immigration, including French and Spanish settlement during the 16th century, as well as entry of new Native American groups migrating from elsewhere in the South, and free black people and fugitive slaves, who in the 19th century became allied with the Native Americans as Black Seminoles. Florida was under colonial rule by Spain from the 16th century to the 19th century, and briefly by Great Britain during the 18th century (1763–1783). Neither Spain nor Britain maintained a large military or civilian population. It became a territory of the United States in 1821. Two decades later, on March 3, 1845, Florida was admitted to the Union as the 27th U.S. state.

Florida is nicknamed the "Sunshine State" due to its warm climate and days of sunshine. Florida's sunny climate, many beaches, and growth of industries have attracted northern migrants within the United States, international migrants, and vacationers since the Florida land boom of the 1920s. A diverse population, urbanization, and a diverse economy would develop in Florida throughout the 20th century. In 2014, Florida with over 19 million people, surpassed New York and became the third most populous state in the U.S.

The economy of Florida has changed over its history, starting with natural resource exploitation in logging, mining, fishing, and sponge diving; as well as cattle ranching, farming, and citrus growing. The tourism, real estate, trade, banking, and retirement destination businesses would develop as economic sectors later on.

== Early history ==
=== Geology ===
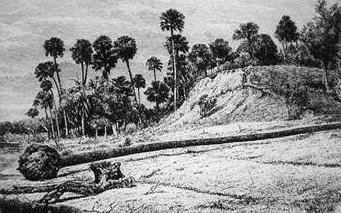
A shell midden at Enterprise, Florida in 1875.

The foundation of Florida was located in the continent of Gondwana at the South Pole 650 million years ago (Mya). When Gondwana collided with the continent of Laurentia 300 Mya, it had moved further north. 200 Mya, the merged continents containing what would be Florida, had moved north of the equator. By then, Florida was surrounded by desert, in the middle of a new continent, Pangaea. When Pangaea broke up 115 mya, Florida assumed a shape as a peninsula. The emergent landmass of Florida was Orange Island, a low-relief island sitting atop the carbonate Florida Platform which emerged about 34 to 28 million years ago. When glaciation locked up the world's water, starting 2.58 million years ago, the sea level dropped precipitously. It was approximately 100 meters (330 ft) lower than present levels. As a result, the Florida peninsula not only emerged, but had a land area about twice what it is today. Florida also had a drier and cooler climate than in more recent times. There were few flowing rivers or wetlands.

=== First Floridians ===
Paleo-Indians entered what is now Florida at least 14,000 years ago, during the last glacial period. With lower sea levels, the Florida peninsula was much wider, and the climate was cooler and much drier than in the present day. Fresh water was available only in sinkholes and limestone catchment basins, and paleo-Indian activity centered around these relatively scarce watering holes. Sinkholes and basins in the beds of modern rivers (such as the Page-Ladson site in the Aucilla River) have yielded a rich trove of paleo-Indian artifacts, including Clovis points.

Excavations at an ancient stone quarry (the Container Corporation of America site in Marion County) yielded "crude stone implements" showing signs of extensive wear from deposits below those holding Paleo-Indian artifacts. Thermoluminescence dating and weathering analysis independently gave dates of 26,000 to 28,000 years ago for the creation of the artifacts. The findings are controversial, and funding has not been available for follow-up studies.

As the glaciers began retreating about 8000 BC, the climate of Florida became warmer and wetter. As the glaciers melted, the sea level rose, reducing the land mass. Many prehistoric habitation sites along the old coastline were slowly submerged, making artifacts from early coastal cultures difficult to find. There were islands throughout Florida as far south as what is now Orlando. The paleo-Indian culture was replaced by, or evolved into, the Early Archaic culture. With an increase in population and more water available, the people occupied many more locations, as evidenced by numerous artifacts. Archaeologists have learned much about the Early Archaic people of Florida from the discoveries made at Windover Pond. The Early Archaic period evolved into the Middle Archaic period around 5000 BC. People started living in villages near wetlands and along the coast at favored sites that were likely occupied for multiple generations.

The Late Archaic period started about 3000 BC, when Florida's climate had reached current conditions and the sea had risen close to its present level. People commonly occupied both fresh and saltwater wetlands. Large shell middens accumulated during this period. Many people lived in large villages with purpose-built earthwork mounds, such as at Horr's Island, which had the largest permanently occupied community in the Archaic period in the southeastern United States. It also has the oldest burial mound in the East, dating to about 1450 BC. People began making fired pottery in Florida by 2000 BC. By about 500 BC, the Archaic culture, which had been fairly uniform across Florida, began to fragment into regional cultures.

The post-Archaic cultures of eastern and southern Florida developed in relative isolation. It is likely that the peoples living in those areas at the time of first European contact were direct descendants of the inhabitants of the areas in late Archaic and Woodland times. The cultures of the Florida panhandle and the north and central Gulf coast of the Florida peninsula were strongly influenced by the Mississippian culture, producing two local variants known as the Pensacola culture and the Fort Walton culture.

Continuity in cultural history suggests that the peoples of those areas were also descended from the inhabitants of the Archaic period. In the panhandle and the northern part of the peninsula, people adopted cultivation of maize. Its cultivation was restricted or absent among the tribes who lived south of the Timucuan-speaking people (i.e., south of a line approximately from present-day Daytona Beach, Florida to a point on or north of Tampa Bay.) Peoples in southern Florida depended on the rich estuarine environment and developed a highly complex society without agriculture. Before European contact, Florida's Indigenous peoples were part of extensive trade networks. They exchanged shells, pottery, and food resources with neighboring regions, making Florida a cultural crossroads. These interactions connected local communities to the broader Mississippian culture world.

=== European contact and aftermath ===
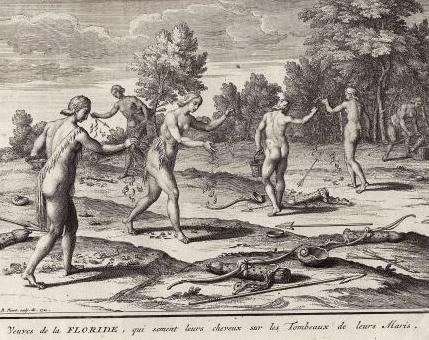
Bernard Picart Copper Plate Engraving of Florida Indians, circa 1721

At the time of first European contact in the early 16th century, Florida was inhabited by an estimated 350,000 people belonging to a number of tribes. (Anthropologist Henry F. Dobyns has estimated that as many as 700,000 people lived in Florida in 1492). The Spanish Empire sent Spanish explorers recording nearly one hundred names of groups they encountered, ranging from organized political entities such as the Apalachee, with a population of around 50,000, to villages with no known political affiliation. There were an estimated 150,000 speakers of dialects of the Timucua language, but the Timucua were organized as groups of villages and did not share a common culture. Other tribes in Florida at the time of first contact included the Ais, Calusa, Jaega, Mayaimi, Tequesta, and Tocobaga.

The populations of all of these tribes decreased markedly during the period of Spanish control of Florida, mostly due to epidemics of newly introduced infectious diseases, to which the Native Americans had no natural immunity. Beginning late in the 17th century, when most of the indigenous peoples were already much reduced in population, peoples from areas to the north of Florida, supplied with arms and occasionally accompanied by white colonists from the Province of Carolina, raided throughout Florida. They burned villages, wounded many of the inhabitants and carried captives back to Charles Towne to be sold into slavery. Most of the villages in Florida were abandoned, and the survivors sought refuge at St. Augustine or in isolated spots around the state. Many tribes became extinct during this period and by the end of the 18th century.

Some of the Apalachee eventually reached Louisiana, where they survived as a distinct group for at least another century. The Spanish evacuated the few surviving members of the Florida tribes to Cuba in 1763 when Spain transferred the territory of Florida to the British Empire following the latter's victory against France in the Seven Years' War. In the aftermath, the Seminole, originally an offshoot of the Creek people who absorbed other groups, developed as a distinct tribe in Florida during the 18th century through the process of ethnogenesis. They have three federally recognized tribes: the largest is the Seminole Nation of Oklahoma, formed of descendants since removal in the 1830s; others are the smaller Seminole Tribe of Florida and the Miccosukee Tribe of Indians of Florida.

== Colonial battleground ==
=== First Spanish rule (1513–1763) ===
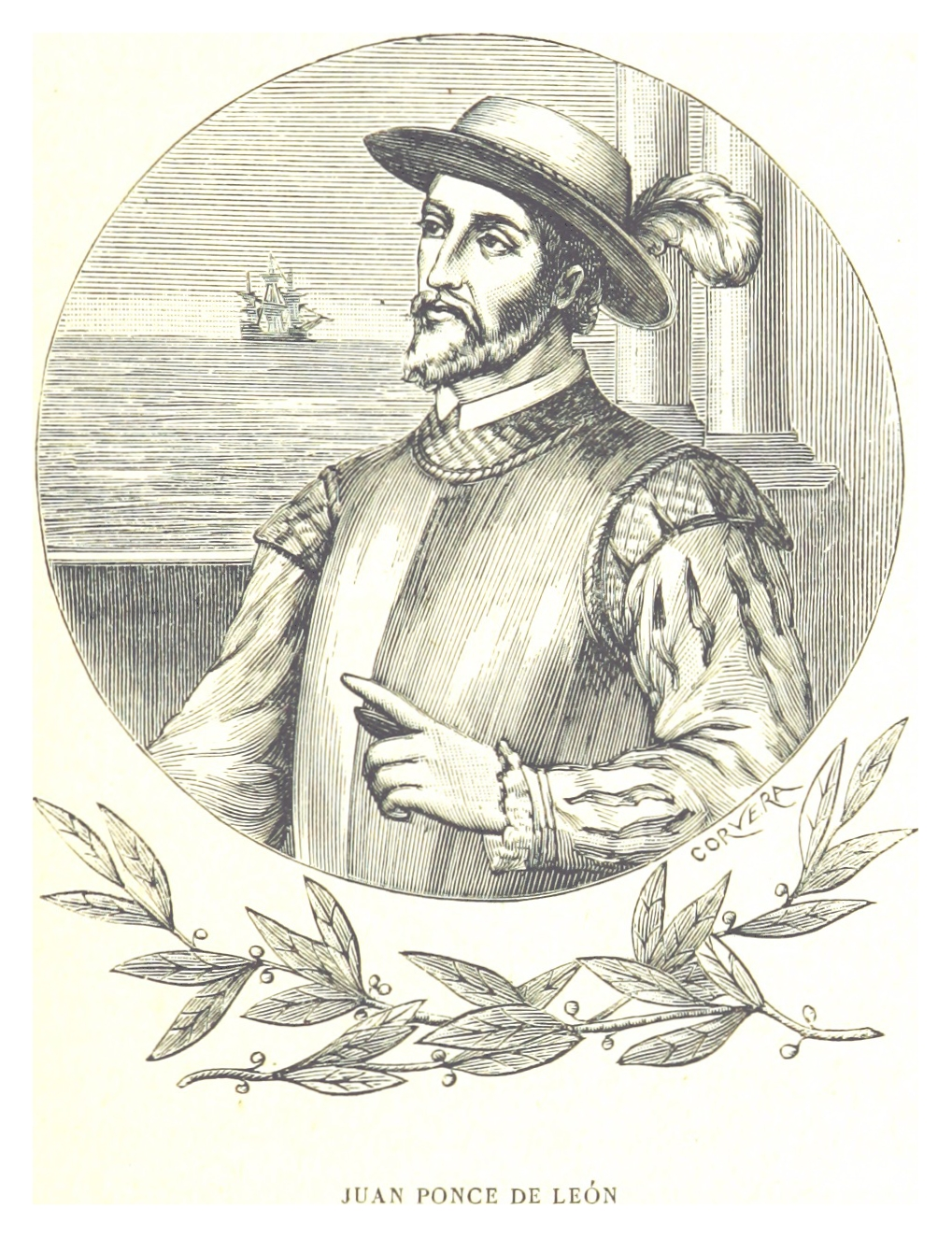
Juan Ponce de León was one of the first Europeans to set foot in the current United States; he led the first European expedition to Florida, which he named.

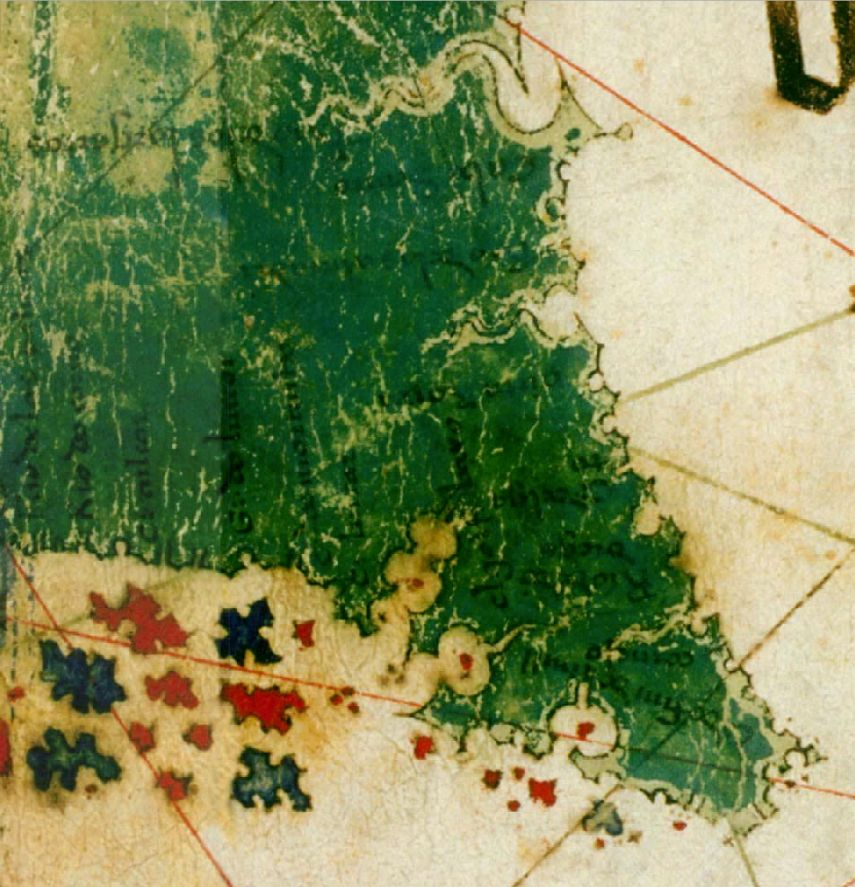
A depiction of what might be Florida from the 1502 Cantino map

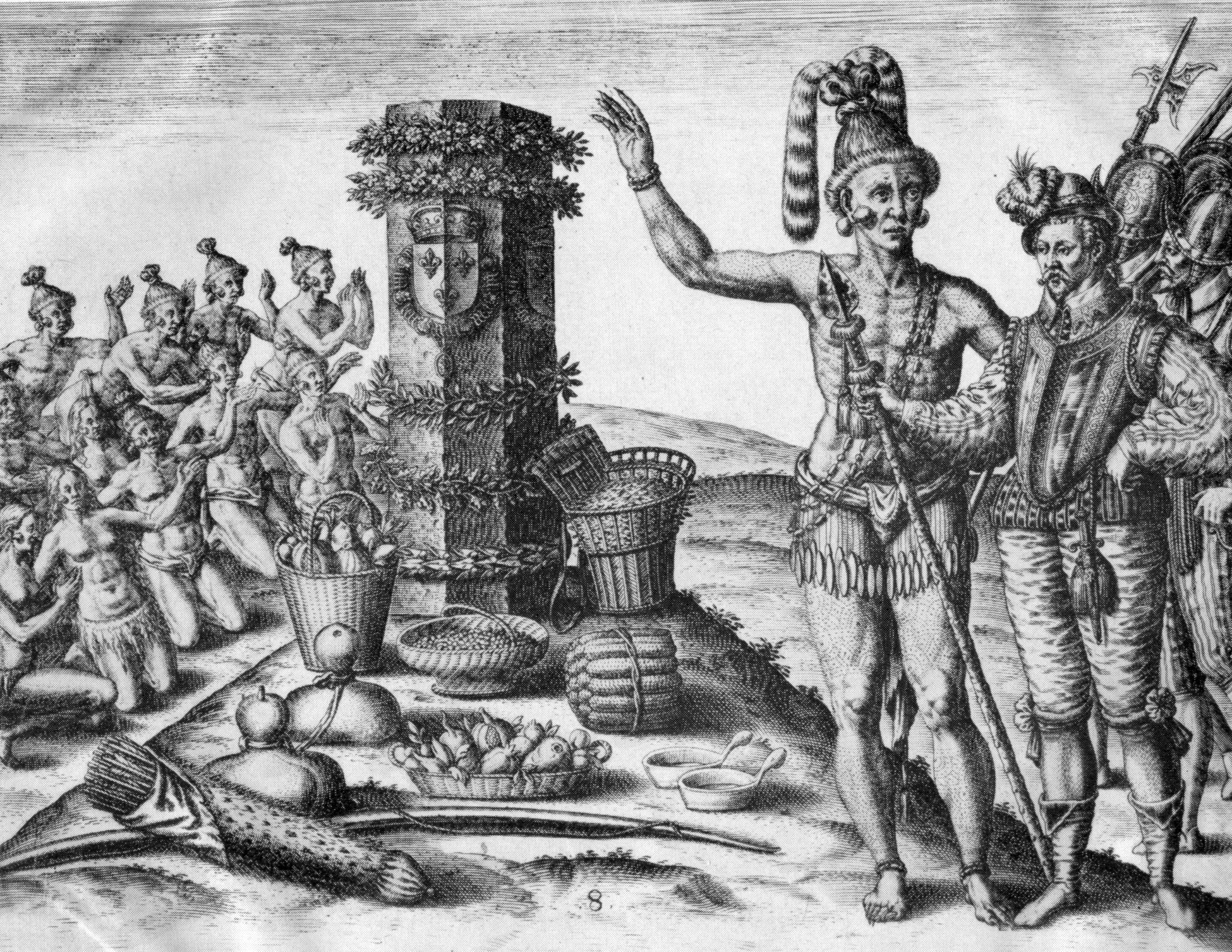
Timucua Indians at a column erected by the French in 1562

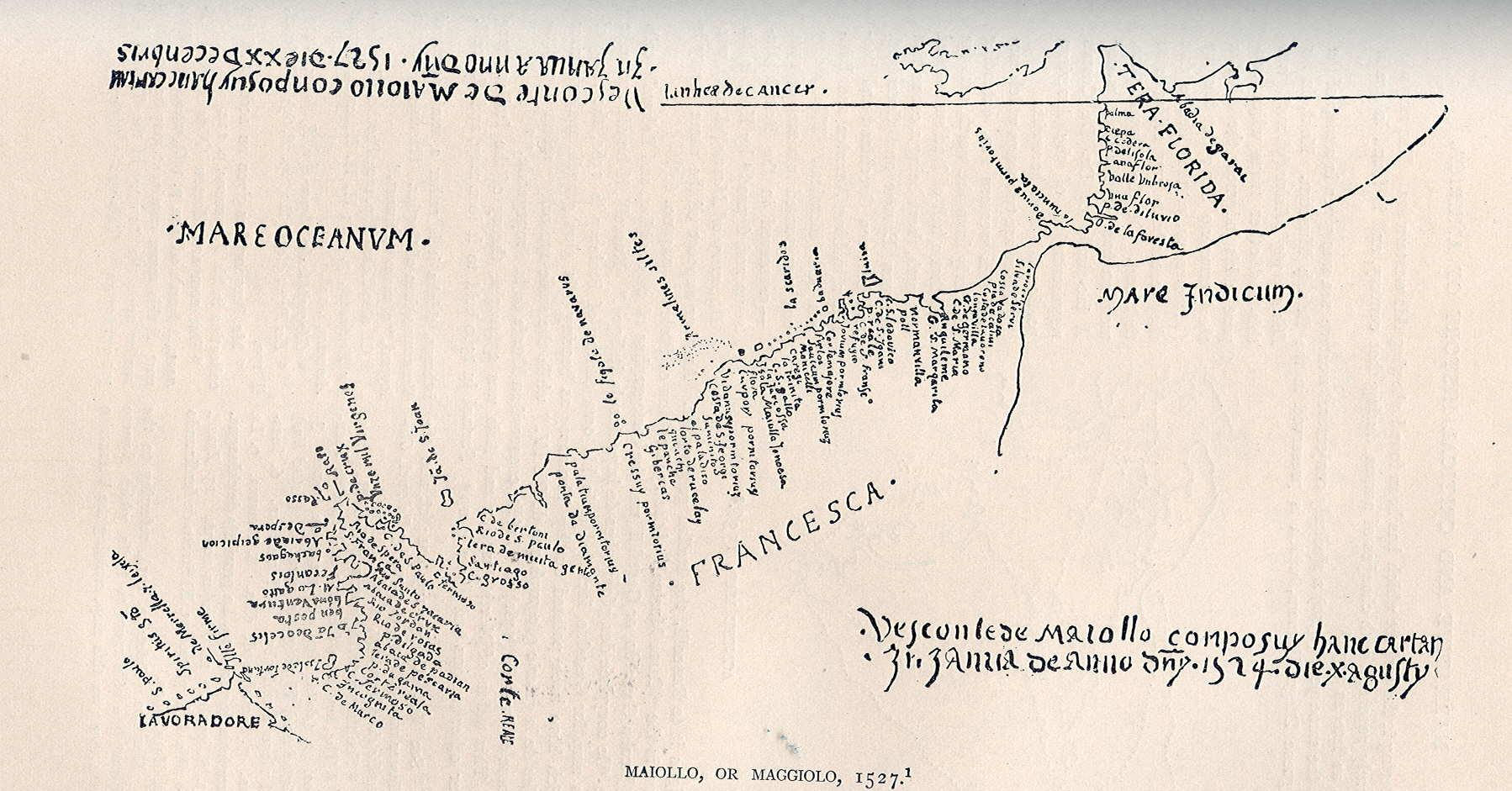
A 1527 map by Vesconte Maggiolo showing the east coast of North America with "Tera Florida" at the top and "Lavoradore" at the bottom.

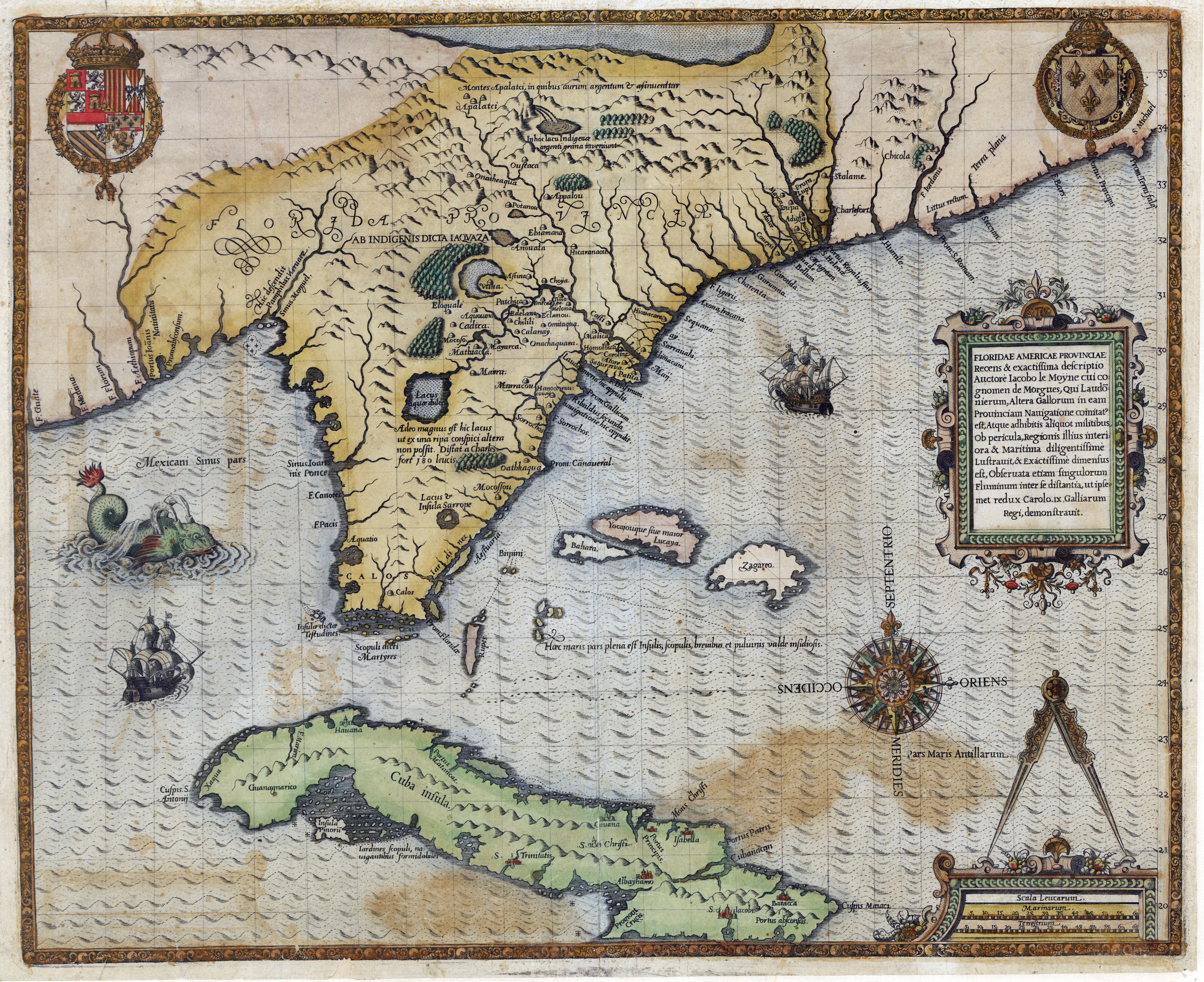
A 1591 map of Florida by Jacques le Moyne de Morgues.

Spanish conqueror and explorer Juan Ponce de León is usually given credit for being the first European to sight Florida in 1513, but he may have had predecessors. Florida and much of the nearby coast is depicted in the Cantino planisphere, an early world map which was surreptitiously copied in 1502 from the most current Portuguese sailing charts and smuggled into Italy a decade before Ponce sailed north from Puerto Rico on his voyage of exploration. Ponce de León may not have even been the first Spaniard to go ashore in Florida; slave traders may have secretly raided native villages before Ponce arrived, as he encountered at least one indigenous tribesman who spoke Spanish. However, Ponce's 1513 expedition to Florida was the first open and official one. He also gave Florida its name, naming it either La Florida (the place of flowers) after the abundance of flora in the area or La Pascua Florida (the festival of flowers, an alternative name for Easter Sunday in Spanish) after the season in which it is thought they first landed. A dubious legend states that Ponce de León was searching for the Fountain of Youth on the island of Bimini, based on information from natives.

On March 3, 1513, Juan Ponce de León organized and equipped three ships for an expedition departing from "Punta Aguada", Puerto Rico. The expedition included 200 people, including women and free black people.

Although it is often stated that he sighted the peninsula for the first time on March 27, 1513, and thought it was an island, he probably saw one of the Bahamas at that time. He went ashore on Florida's east coast during the Spanish Easter feast, Pascua Florida, on April 7 and named the land La Pascua de la Florida. After briefly exploring the land south of present-day St. Augustine, the expedition sailed south to the bottom of the Florida peninsula, through the Florida Keys, and up the west coast as far north as Charlotte Harbor, where they briefly skirmished with the Calusa before heading back to Puerto Rico.

From 1513 onward, the land became known as La Florida. After 1630, and throughout the 18th century, Tegesta (after the Tequesta tribe) was an alternate name of choice for the Florida peninsula following publication of a map by the Dutch cartographer Hessel Gerritsz in Joannes de Laet's History of the New World.

Further Spanish attempts to explore and colonize Florida were disastrous. Ponce de León returned to the Charlotte Harbor area in 1521 with equipment and settlers to start a colony, but was soon driven off by hostile Calusa, and de León died in Cuba from wounds received in the fighting. Pánfilo de Narváez's expedition explored Florida's west coast in 1528, but his violent demands for gold and food led to hostile relations with the Tocobaga and other native groups. Facing starvation and unable to find his support ships, Narváez attempted return to Mexico via rafts, but all were lost at sea and only four members of the expedition survived. Hernando de Soto landed in Florida in 1539 and began a multi-year trek through what is now the southeastern United States in which he found no gold and lost his life. In 1559 Tristán de Luna y Arellano established the first settlement in Pensacola but, after a violent hurricane destroyed the area, it was abandoned in 1561. Spanish attempts to claim Florida's east coast grew steadily despite this due to Spain's increasing influence on the land. By the end of the 16th century, Spain started sending fleets of ships annually for valuables and resources.

The horse, which the natives had hunted to extinction 10,000 years ago, was reintroduced into North America by the European explorers, and into Florida in 1538. As the animals were lost or stolen, they began to become feral.

In 1564, René Goulaine de Laudonnière founded Fort Caroline in what is now Jacksonville, as a haven for Huguenot Protestant refugees from religious persecution in France. Further down the coast, in 1565 Pedro Menéndez de Avilés founded San Agustín (St. Augustine) which is the oldest continuously inhabited European settlement in any U.S. state. It is second oldest only to San Juan, Puerto Rico, in the United States' current territory. From this base of operations, the Spanish began building Catholic missions.

All colonial cities were founded near the mouths of rivers. St. Augustine was founded where the Matanzas Inlet permitted access to the Matanzas River. Other cities were founded on the sea with similar inlets: Jacksonville, West Palm Beach, Fort Lauderdale, Miami, Pensacola, Tampa, Fort Myers, and others.

On September 20, 1565, Menéndez de Avilés attacked Fort Caroline, killing most of the French Huguenot defenders. Two years later, Dominique de Gourgue recaptured the settlement for France, this time slaughtering the Spanish defenders.

St. Augustine became the most important settlement in Florida. Little more than a fort, it was constantly in some form of danger and did face the dangers many other early European colonies had. It was notably devastated in 1586, when English sea captain and sometime pirate Sir Francis Drake plundered and burned the city. Later sometime in 1599 a fire would burn down the Franciscan monastery that was present and the southern part of St. Augustine and a few months later on September 22, 1599, a hurricane would hit destroying much of the town. Although St. Augustine faced many hardships the Spanish decided to maintain the town and the colony as a way to counteract English expansion in the Americas and to help protect Spanish ships.

Catholic missionaries used St. Augustine as a base of operations to establish over 100 far-flung missions throughout Florida. They converted 26,000 natives by 1655, but a revolt in 1656 and an epidemic in 1659 proved devastating. Construction on Castillo de San Marcos in St. Augustine would begin in 1672 and finish in 1695. Another fort, named Fort Matanzas would be built in 1742 to defend St. Augustine's entrance from the Matanzas Inlet. The total population of St. Augustine during the Spanish period has some degree of uncertainty but several census were taken. A 1675 census found it had a population of 300 while a 1689 census found there was 1,444 people that lived there. Another done in 1736 found 1,409 residents. By 1763 the population of St. Augustine was larger than Williamsburg, Virginia or any other town in the southern British colonies with the exception of Charleston, South Carolina.

African slaves used primarily for labor were first introduced to Spanish Florida as early as 1580, when officials asked for permission to import slaves to bolster the workforce in and around St. Augustine. However, due to restrictions by the Spanish crown, the population of African slaves in Florida remained relatively low until around the period of British control in 1763. Spanish settlers introduced cattle ranching to Florida in the 16th century, creating one of the state's longest-lasting industries. By the late 17th century, ranches were established along the St. Johns River and in the Apalachee Province, despite conflicts with Native peoples and raids from English colonists.

Throughout the 17th century, English settlers in Virginia and Carolina gradually pushed the boundaries of Spanish territory south, while the French settlements along the Mississippi River encroached on the western borders of the Spanish claim. In 1702, Governor of Carolina James Moore and allied Yamasee and Creek Indians attacked and razed the town of St. Augustine, but they could not gain control of the fort. In 1704, Moore and his soldiers began burning Spanish missions in north Florida and executing Indians friendly with the Spanish. The collapse of the Spanish mission system and the defeat of the Spanish-allied Apalachee Indians (the Apalachee massacre) opened Florida up to slave raids, which reached to the Florida Keys and decimated the native population. The Yamasee War of 1715–1717 in the Carolinas resulted in numerous Indian refugees, such as the Yamasee, moving south to Florida. In 1719, the French captured the Spanish settlement at Pensacola.

==== Fugitive slaves and conflicts ====
The border between the British colony of Georgia and Spanish Florida was never clearly defined, and was the subject of constant harassment in both directions, until it was ceded by Spain to the U.S. in 1821. The Spanish Crown, beginning with King Charles II in 1693, encouraged fugitive slaves from the British North American colonies to escape and offered them freedom and refuge if they converted to Catholicism. This was well known through word of mouth in the colonies of Georgia and South Carolina, and hundreds of enslaved Africans escaped to their freedom, which infuriated colonists in the British North American colonies. They settled in a buffer community north of St. Augustine, called Gracia Real de Santa Teresa de Mose, the first settlement made of free black people in North America.

During this period, the British (including their North American colonies) repeatedly attacked Spanish Florida, especially in 1702 and again in 1740, when a large force under James Oglethorpe sailed south from Georgia and besieged St. Augustine, but was unable to capture the Castillo de San Marcos. The 1755 Lisbon earthquake triggered a tsunami that would have struck Central Florida with an estimated 1.5-meter (4 ft 11 in) wave.

Creek and Seminole Native Americans, who had established buffer settlements in Florida at the invitation of the Spanish government, also welcomed any fugitive slaves who reached their settlements. In 1771, Governor John Moultrie wrote to the Board of Trade that "it has been a practice for a good while past, for negroes to run away from their Masters, and get into the Indian towns, from whence it proved very difficult to get them back". When British colonial officials in Florida pressed the Seminole to return runaway slaves, they replied that they had "merely given hungry people food, and invited the slaveholders to catch the runaways themselves".

=== British rule (1763–1783) ===
The expanded West Florida territory in 1767.

In 1763, Spain traded Florida to the Kingdom of Great Britain for control of Havana, Cuba, which had been captured by the British during the Seven Years' War. It was part of a large expansion of British territory following the country's victory in the Seven Years' War. Almost the entire Spanish population left, taking along most of the remaining indigenous population to Cuba. The British divided the territory into East Florida and West Florida. The British soon constructed the King's Road connecting St. Augustine to Georgia. The road crossed the St. Johns River at a narrow point, which the Seminole called Wacca Pilatka and the British named "Cow Ford", both names ostensibly reflecting the fact that cattle were brought across the river there. The British government gave land grants to officers and soldiers who had fought in the French and Indian War in order to encourage settlement. In order to induce settlers to move to the two new colonies reports of the natural wealth of Florida were published in England. A large number of British colonists who were "energetic and of good character" moved to Florida, mostly coming from South Carolina, Georgia and England, though there was also a group of settlers who came from the colony of Bermuda. This would be the first permanent English-speaking population in what is now Duval County, Baker County, St. Johns County, and Nassau County. The British built good public roads and introduced the cultivation of sugar cane, indigo, and fruits, as well the export of lumber. As a result of these initiatives northeastern Florida prospered economically in a way it never did under Spanish rule. Furthermore, the British governors were directed to call general assemblies as soon as possible to make laws for the Floridas and in the meantime they were, with the advice of councils, to establish courts. This would be the first introduction of much of the English-derived legal system which Florida still has today, including trial by jury, habeas corpus, and county-based government.

A Scottish settler named Andrew Turnbull transplanted around 1,500 indentured settlers, from Menorca, Mallorca, Ibiza, Smyrna, Crete, Mani Peninsula, and Sicily, to grow hemp, sugarcane, indigo, and to produce rum. Settled at New Smyrna, within months the colony suffered major losses primarily due to insect-borne diseases and Native American raids. Most crops did not do well in the sandy Florida soil. Those that survived rarely equaled the quality produced in other colonies. The colonists tired of their servitude and Turnbull's rule. On several occasions, he used African slaves to whip his unruly settlers. The settlement collapsed and the survivors fled to safety with the British authorities in St. Augustine. Their descendants survive to this day, as does the name New Smyrna.

In 1767, the British moved the northern boundary of West Florida to a line extending from the mouth of the Yazoo River east to the Chattahoochee River (32° 28′ north latitude), consisting of approximately the lower third of the present states of Mississippi and Alabama. During this time, Creek Indians migrated into Florida and formed the Seminole tribe.

In 2025, archaeologists in St. Augustine uncovered the remains of an eighteenth-century British redoubt built in 1781, providing the first direct archaeological evidence of British military fortifications in the city during Florida's brief period of British rule.

==== Florida in the American Revolutionary War ====
When representatives from thirteen North American colonies declared independence from Great Britain in 1776, many Floridians condemned the action. East and West Florida were backwater outposts whose populations included a large percentage of British military personnel and their families. There was little trade in or out of the colonies, so they were largely unaffected by the Stamp Act Crisis of 1765 and other taxes and policies which brought other British colonies together in common interest against a shared threat. Thus, a majority of Florida residents were Loyalists, and both East and West Florida declined to send representatives to any sessions of the Continental Congress.

Governor Patrick Tonyn raised four black militia units to protect East Florida. Enslaved blacks who fought for the British Crown were promised freedom. However, due to the passing of stricter slave codes and the efforts of slave owners, few of those who fought were granted their freedom.

During the American Revolutionary War, Florida Loyalists fighting for the English Crown participated in raids against the Patriot forces in South Carolina and Georgia. Continental forces attempted to invade East Florida early in the conflict, but they were defeated on May 17, 1777, at the Battle of Thomas Creek in today's Nassau County when American Colonel John Baker surrendered to the British. Another American incursion into the same area was repelled at the Battle of Alligator Bridge on June 30, 1778.

The two Floridas remained loyal to Great Britain throughout the war. However, Spain, participating indirectly in the war as an ally of France, captured Pensacola from the British in 1781. The Peace of Paris (1783) ended the Revolutionary War and returned all of Florida to Spanish control, but without specifying the boundaries. The Spanish wanted the expanded northern boundary Britain had made to West Florida, while the new United States demanded the old boundary at the 31st parallel north. This border controversy was resolved in the 1795 Treaty of San Lorenzo when Spain recognized the 31st parallel as the boundary.

==== Departure of the British ====
Just as most residents of Spanish Florida had left when Britain gained possession of the territory in 1763, the impending return to Spanish control in 1783 saw a vast exodus of those who had settled in the area over the previous twenty years. This included many Loyalists who had fled there during the American War of Independence and had caused East Florida's population to swell considerably if temporarily.

=== Second Spanish rule (1783–1821) ===
Spain's reoccupation of Florida involved the arrival of some officials and soldiers at St. Augustine and Pensacola but very few new settlers. Most British residents had departed, leaving much of the territory depopulated and unguarded. North Florida continued to be the home of the newly amalgamated black–native American Seminole culture and a haven for people escaping slavery in the southern United States. Settlers in southern Georgia demanded that Spain control the Seminole population and capture runaway slaves, to which Spain replied that the slave owners were welcome to recapture the runaways themselves.

Americans began moving into northern Florida from the backwoods of Georgia and South Carolina. Though technically not allowed by the Spanish authorities, the Spanish were never able to effectively police the border region, and a mix of American settlers, escaped slaves, and Native Americans would continue to migrate into Florida unchecked. The American migrants, mixing with the few remaining settlers from Florida's British period, would be the progenitors of the population known as Florida Crackers.

==== Republic of West Florida ====
Ignoring Spanish territorial claims, American settlers, along with some remaining British settlers, established a permanent foothold in the western end of West Florida during the first decade of the 1800s. In the summer of 1810, they began planning a rebellion against Spanish rule which became open revolt in September. The rebels overcame the Spanish garrison at Baton Rouge and proclaimed the "Free and Independent Republic of West Florida" on September 23. (None of it was within what is today the state of Florida.) Their flag was the original "Bonnie Blue Flag", a single white star on a blue field. On October 27, 1810, most of the Republic of West Florida was annexed by proclamation of President James Madison, who claimed that the region was included in the Louisiana Purchase and incorporated it into the newly formed Territory of Orleans. Some leaders of the newly declared republic objected to the takeover, but all had deferred to arriving American troops by mid-December 1810. The Florida Parishes of the modern state of Louisiana include most of the territory claimed by the short-lived Republic of West Florida.

Spain sided with Great Britain during the War of 1812, and the U.S. annexed the Mobile District of West Florida to the Mississippi Territory in May 1812. The surrender of Spanish forces at Mobile in April 1813 officially established American control over the area, which was eventually divided between the states of Alabama and Mississippi.

==== Republic of East Florida ====
In March 1812, a small independent band of Americans took control of Amelia Island on the Atlantic coast. They declared that they were now an independent republic free from Spanish rule in what would become known as the Patriot War. The revolt was organized by General George Mathews of the U.S. Army, who had been authorized to secretly negotiate with the Spanish governor for American acquisition of East Florida. Instead, Mathews organized a group of frontiersmen in Georgia, who arrived at the Spanish town of Fernandina and demanded the surrender of all of Amelia Island. Upon declaring the island a republic, he led his volunteers along with a contingent of regular army troops south towards St. Augustine. Upon hearing of Mathews' actions, the government became alarmed that he would provoke war with Spain. Secretary of State James Monroe ordered Matthews to return all captured territory to Spanish authorities. After several months of negotiations on the withdrawal of the Americans and compensation for their foraging through the countryside, the countries came to an agreement, and Amelia Island was returned to the Spanish in May 1813.

A similar filibuster action took place in September 1817, when the Scottish veteran and con-man Gregor MacGregor led a private force and captured Amelia Island and declared it part of the Republic of the Floridas. By December 1817, the United States seized the island.

==== First Seminole War ====
The unguarded Florida border was an increasing source of tension late in the second Spanish period. Seminoles based in East Florida had been accused of raiding Georgia settlements, and settlers were angered by the stream of slaves escaping into Florida, where they were welcomed. Negro Fort, an abandoned British fortification in the far west of the territory, was manned by both indigenous and black people. The United States Army would lead increasingly frequent incursions into Spanish territory, including the 1817–1818 campaign against the Seminole Indians by Andrew Jackson that became known later as the First Seminole War. Jackson took temporary control of Pensacola in 1818, and though he withdrew due to Spanish objections, the United States continued to effectively control much of West Florida. According to Secretary of State John Quincy Adams, this was necessary because Florida had become "a derelict open to the occupancy of every enemy, civilized or savage, of the United States, and serving no other earthly purpose than as a post of annoyance to them". The Seminole Wars were, in addition to military conflicts, also cultural struggles. Seminole leaders fought to preserve their autonomy and traditions against U.S. expansion.

==== End of Spanish control ====
After Jackson's incursions, Spain decided that Florida had become too much of a burden, as it could not afford to send settlers or garrisons to properly occupy the land and was receiving very little revenue from the territory. Madrid therefore decided to cede Florida to the United States. The transfer was negotiated as part of the Adams–Onís Treaty, which also settled several boundary disputes between Spanish colonies and the U.S. in exchange for American payment of $5,000,000 in claims against the Spanish government. The treaty was signed in 1819 and took effect in 1821, and the United States formally took possession of Florida on July 17, 1821.

== Territory and statehood ==
=== Florida Territory (1822–1845) ===
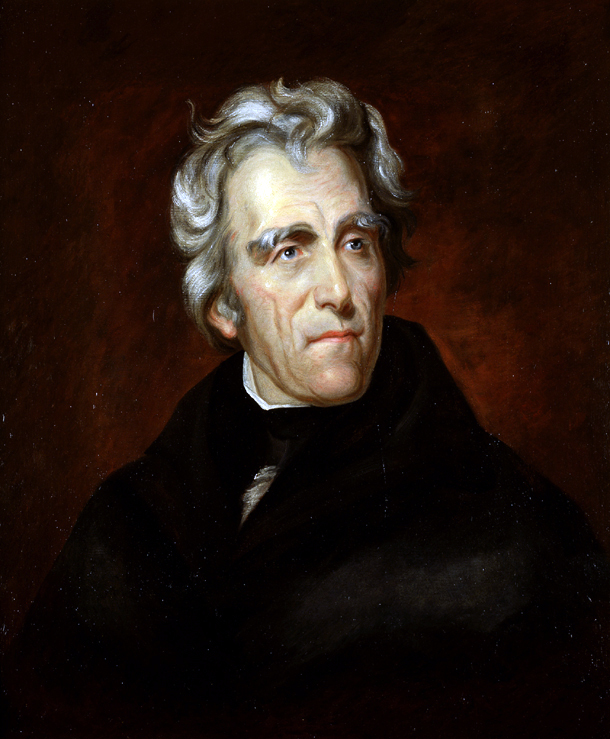
Andrew Jackson served as the first military Governor of Florida.

Florida Territory became an organized territory of the United States on March 30, 1822. Due to disputes between the British and the Spanish, this new territory had two capitols, one in St. Augustine and one in Pensacola. It became necessary, however, to combine these capitols and resolve these disputes. In 1841, the U.S. merged East Florida and West Florida (although the majority of West Florida was annexed to Territory of Orleans and Mississippi Territory), and established a new capital in Tallahassee, conveniently located halfway between the East Florida capital of St. Augustine and the West Florida capital of Pensacola. The boundaries of Florida's first two counties, Escambia and St. Johns, approximately coincided with the boundaries of West and East Florida respectively.

The free black and Indigenous slaves, Black Seminoles, living near St. Augustine, fled to Havana, Cuba to avoid coming under US control. Some Seminole also abandoned their settlements and moved further south. Hundreds of Black Seminoles and fugitive slaves escaped in the early nineteenth century from Cape Florida to The Bahamas, where they settled on Andros Island.

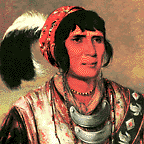
Seminole leader Osceola.

As settlement increased, pressure grew on the United States government to remove the Indians from their lands in Florida. Many settlers in Florida developed plantation agriculture, similar to other areas of the Deep South. To the consternation of new landowners, the Seminoles harbored and integrated runaway black slaves, and clashes between whites and Indians grew with the influx of new settlers. Paul S. George's A Guide to the History of Florida emphasizes the diversity of historical influences that shaped the state, from Indigenous societies to Spanish, British, and American governance. The guide also traces the growth of Florida's major cities and the development of regional identities.

In 1832, the United States government signed the Treaty of Payne's Landing with some of the Seminole chiefs, promising them lands west of the Mississippi River if they agreed to leave Florida voluntarily. Many Seminoles left then, while those who remained prepared to defend their claims to the land. White settlers pressured the government to remove all of the Indians, by force if necessary, and in 1835, the U.S. Army arrived to enforce the treaty.

The Second Seminole War began at the end of 1835 with the Dade Battle, when Seminoles ambushed Army troops marching from Fort Brooke (Tampa) to reinforce Fort King (Ocala). They killed or mortally wounded all but one of the 110 troops. Between 900 and 1,500 Seminole warriors effectively employed guerrilla tactics against United States Army troops for seven years. Osceola, a charismatic young war leader, came to symbolize the war and the Seminoles after he was arrested by Brigadier General Joseph Marion Hernandez while negotiating under a white truce flag in October 1837, by order of General Thomas Jesup. First imprisoned at Fort Marion, he died of malaria at Fort Moultrie in South Carolina less than three months after his capture. The war ended in 1842. The U.S. government is estimated to have spent between $20 million ($667,241,379 in 2025 dollars) and $40 million ($1,334,482,759 in 2025 dollars) on the war; at the time, this was considered a large sum. Almost all of the Seminoles were forcibly exiled to Creek lands west of the Mississippi; several hundred remained in the Everglades.

During the territorial period, the region of Middle Florida between the Apalachee and Suwanee Rivers grew in population.

When Florida was a territory, there was much debate regarding its statehood. It was proposed several times that the territory be split with varying motivations ranging from: the regions of East and West Florida feeling a sense of disconnection from each other, adding another slave state and that Pensacola would be a good port for Alabama. A statehood referendum was held in 1837 with a majority (63%) voting in favor of statehood. In 1845 a bill was introduced in the US House to admit East and West Florida as separate states but this was later voted down and modified to all of Florida instead which ended up passing.

=== Statehood (1845) ===
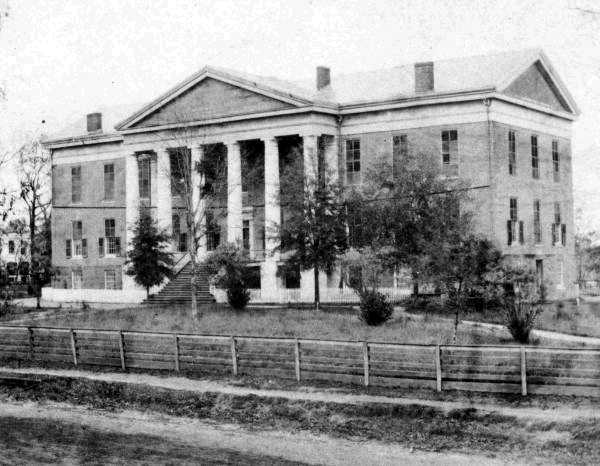
The brick Capitol as built in 1845.

On March 3, 1845, Florida became the 27th state of the United States of America. Its first governor was William Dunn Moseley.

Almost half the state's population were enslaved African Americans working on large cotton and sugar plantations, between the Apalachicola and Suwannee rivers in the north central part of the state. Like the people who owned them, many slaves had come from the coastal areas of Georgia and the Carolinas. They were part of the Gullah–Geechee culture of the Lowcountry. Others were enslaved African Americans from the upper South who had been sold to traders taking slaves to the deep South. Historian Edward E. Baptist explains that early Florida planters actively shaped the region into a version of the "Old South," expanding plantation agriculture and slaveholding culture into new territories. This effort helped establish social and economic systems that would define Florida through the mid-19th century.

In the 1850s, with the potential transfer of ownership of federal land to the state, including Seminole land, the federal government decided to convince the remaining Seminoles to emigrate. The Army reactivated Fort Harvie and renamed it to Fort Myers. Increased Army patrols led to hostilities, and eventually a Seminole attack on Fort Myers which killed two United States soldiers. The Third Seminole War lasted from 1855 to 1858 which ended with most of the remaining Seminoles, mostly women and children moving to Indian Territory. In 1859, another 75 Seminoles surrendered and were sent to the West, but a small number continued to live in the Everglades.

On the eve of the Civil War, Florida had the smallest population of the Southern states. It was invested in plantation agriculture, which was dependent on the labor of enslaved African Americans. By 1860, Florida had 140,424 people, of whom 44% were enslaved and fewer than 1,000 were free people of color. Florida also had one of the highest per capita murder rates prior to the Civil War, thanks to a weakened central government, the institution of slavery, and a troubled political history.

== Civil War through late 19th century ==
=== American Civil War ===
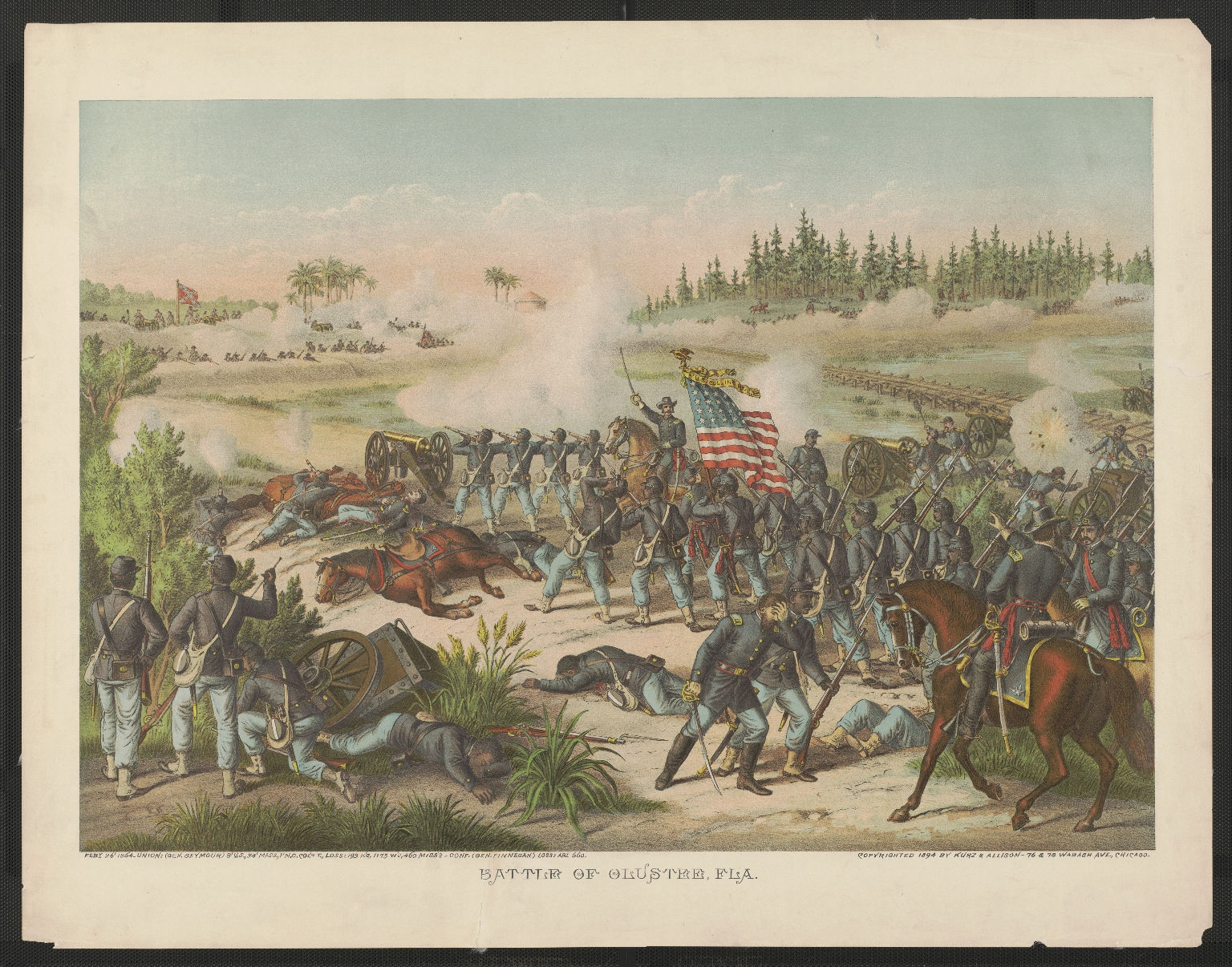
The Battle of Olustee was the only major Civil War battle fought in Florida.

Following Abraham Lincoln's election in 1860, Florida joined other Southern states in seceding from the Union. Secession took place January 10, 1861, and after less than a month as an independent republic, Florida became one of the founding seven states of the Confederate States of America. During the Civil War, Florida was an important supply route for the Confederate Army. Therefore, Union forces operated a naval blockade around the entire state, and Union troops occupied major ports such as Cedar Key, Jacksonville, Key West, and Pensacola. Though numerous skirmishes occurred in Florida, including the Battle of Natural Bridge, the Battle of Marianna and the Battle of Gainesville, the only major battle was the Battle of Olustee near Lake City.

In 1861, at the start of the war, the state had a population of roughly 140,000, with half of that being enslaved African Americans. In spite of the state's relatively small population, Florida did send several units to fight up north, most notably the 1st Florida, the 8th Florida and the 3rd Florida Infantry Regiment.

Florida played a key role in supporting the Confederate economy. The state supplied beef, pork, corn, and salt to Southern armies, while salt production along the Gulf Coast was vital for food preservation. Union blockades of Florida's coastline disrupted these efforts, highlighting the state's strategic importance.

Most of the population were not enthusiastic about the secession, and the Unionist movement that was a minority in Florida between 1861 and 1862 increased notably during the last three years of the war, especially in Jacksonville, Tampa, Sarasota and most of South and Northwest Florida, where Unionist regiments were formed. Tensions within the state grew as this movement gained traction. Despite the state siding with Confederate values initially, this changed as the war continued. At the time of the end of the war, most Floridians deserted the Confederate Army and the government in Florida was under anarchy until the Union troops returned to Florida. Florida played a more significant role in the Civil War than is often recognized, serving as a key supplier of cattle and salt to the Confederacy. Paul Taylor's research highlights that Florida's long coastline created ongoing challenges for Union blockades seeking to restrict Confederate trade.

=== Reconstruction era ===
During the Reconstruction era that followed the Civil War, moderate Republicans took charge of the state, first led by Governor Harrison Reed. In order to combat the increasingly growing Ku Klux Klan, Reed mobilized black and white militias and purchased two thousand rifles in New York with which to arm them. However, the train carrying the arms was attacked by members of the Klan and the weapons were lost.

The moderate regime plunged into complicated maneuvering and infighting. It drafted a conservative constitution. The extended contest between liberals and radicals inside the Republican Party alienated so many voters that the Democrats took power. They rigged elections, disenfranchised black voters, and made the state a reliable part of the "Solid South".

A state convention was held in 1868 to rewrite the constitution. After meeting the requirements of Congress, including ratification of the 13th and 14th Amendments to the U.S. Constitution, Florida was readmitted to the Union on July 4, 1868. This did not end the struggle for political power among groups in the state. Southern whites objected to freedmen's political participation and complained of illiterate representatives to the state legislature. But of the six members who could not read or write during the seven years of Republican rule, four were white.

Also in the late 1860s, another proposal came for Alabama to annex part of the Florida panhandle. This proposal entailed Alabama annexing Florida west of the Choctawhatchee River with a resolution passing the Alabama General Assembly authorizing the Alabama Governor William Hugh Smith to negotiate with Florida's governor about the annexation. Florida passed a resolution to hold a special election which was voted in favor of with 1,162 voting for it and 681 against it but this annexation proposal never went through and no transaction ever took place.

After Federal troops left the South in 1877, conservative white Democrats engaged in voter suppression and intimidation, regaining control of the state legislature. This was accomplished partly through violent actions by white paramilitary groups targeting freedmen and their allies to discourage them from voting.

Thanks to government enticements, entrepreneurs like Henry Flagler, Henry B. Plant, and Hamilton Disston, invested heavily in Florida, especially its infrastructure. The development of railroads and other transportation in the state led the population to almost double in the 1880s and 1890s.

=== Disenfranchisement ===
From 1885 to 1889, after regaining power, the white-dominated state legislature passed statutes to impose poll taxes and other barriers to voter registration and voting, to eliminate voting by black people and poor whites. These two groups had threatened white Democratic power with a populist coalition. As these groups were stripped from voter rolls, white Democrats established power in a one-party state, as happened across the South.

In this period, white violence rose against black people, particularly in the form of lynchings, which reached a peak around the turn of the century.

The Great Freeze of 1894–95 ruined citrus crops, which had a detrimental ripple effect on the economy of Central Florida in particular. By 1900 the state's African Americans numbered more than 200,000, roughly 44 percent of the total population. This was the same proportion as before the Civil War, and they were effectively disenfranchised. Not being able to vote meant they could not sit on juries, and were not elected to local, state or federal offices. They also were not recruited for law enforcement or other government positions. After the end of Reconstruction, the Florida legislature passed Jim Crow laws establishing racial segregation in public facilities and transportation. Separate railroad cars or sections of cars for different races were required beginning in 1887. Separate waiting rooms at railroad stations were required beginning in 1909.

Without political representation, African Americans found that their facilities were underfunded and they were pushed into a second-class position.

=== Spanish–American War ===
After the start of the first liberation war in Cuba, known as the Ten Years' War (1868–1878), around 100,000 Cubans fled their homes to avoid the violence and upheaval. Generally speaking, the rich and middle class Cubans settled in Europe or northern cities like New York, Philadelphia, and Boston. Meanwhile, the more poor workers ended up settling in south Florida, first in Key West and then eventually in Tampa. However, there were also a number of Spanish living in Florida. Because of the heterogeneous nature of Florida's population, there were both pro and anti-war sentiments leading up to the start of the Spanish–American War in 1898.

Because of their proximity to Cuba, Floridians worried that their cities could come under direct attack with the outbreak of war. Tampa would serve as an embarkation port for troops heading to Cuba. Major General Nelson A. Miles ordered a base built in Miami despite earlier rejections by a board of officers. Soldiers began arriving on June 24, 1898. They were volunteers, mostly from the southern states.

== Since 1900 ==
In 1900, Florida was largely agricultural and frontier; most Floridians lived within 50 miles of the Georgia border. The population grew from 529,000 in 1900 to 18.3 million in 2009. The population explosion began with the great land boom of the 1920s as Florida became a destination for vacationers and a southern land speculator's paradise. People from throughout the Southeast migrated to Florida during this time, creating a larger southern culture in the central part of the state, and expanding the existing one in the northern region.

By 1920, Florida had the highest rate of lynchings per capita, although the overall total had declined. Violence of whites against black people continued into the post-World War II period, and there were lynchings and riots in several small towns in the early 1920s. Florida had the only recorded lynching in 1945, in October after the war's end, when a black man was killed after being falsely accused of assaulting a white girl.

In the 1920s, many developers invested in land in the southern part of the State in areas such as Miami, and Palm Beach attracting more people in the Southern States. When the Crash came in 1929, prices of houses plunged, but the sunshine remained. Hurt badly by the Great Depression and the land bust, Florida, along with many other States, kept afloat with federal relief money under the Franklin D. Roosevelt Administration.

After World War II, the state would grow dramatically going from having a population of 2.7 million in 1950 to 16 million by 2000 along with going from being the 20th most populated state in 1950 to being the 4th most by 2000 and 3rd by 2014. Florida's strong population growth followed other states in the southern and western United States along with following the same trend as many residents moving to the state were from the Midwest and Northeastern US. Many new residents in Florida were elderly and as a result the average age in Florida would increase from 28.8 in 1950 to 39.3 by 2000. Technological reasons behind Florida's growth included air conditioning and DDT.

=== Race relations ===
After World War I, there was a rise in lynchings and other racial violence directed by whites against black people in the state, as well as across the South. It was due in part from strains of rapid social and economic changes, as well as competition for jobs, and lingering resentment resulting from the Reconstruction after the Civil War, as well as tensions among both black and white populations created by the return of black veterans.

Whites continued to resort to lynchings to keep dominance, and tensions rose. Florida led the South and the nation in lynchings per capita from 1900 to 1930.

White mobs committed massacres, accompanied by wholesale destruction of black houses, churches, and schools, in the small communities of Ocoee, November 1920; Perry in December 1922; and Rosewood in January 1923. The governor appointed a special grand jury and special prosecuting attorney to investigate Rosewood and Levy County, but the jury did not find sufficient evidence to prosecute. Rosewood was never resettled.

The Ku Klux Klan had several active Klaverns in Florida in the 1920s, starting in Jacksonville in late 1922. Like elsewhere in the south, Klan members terrorized African Americans, Catholics, immigrants and anyone else proclaiming racial equality. They also intimidated voters at polling locations and were direct participants in politics. For example, in the June primaries of 1922, the Klan had winning candidates for several offices throughout Volusia County. The three largest Klaverns in the state were in Jacksonville, Miami, and St. Petersburg.

About 40,000 African Americans migrated from Florida to northern cities in the Great Migration from 1910 to 1940. That was one-fifth of their population in 1900. They sought better lives, including decent-paying jobs, better education for their children, and the chance to vote and participate in political life — escaping segregation, lynchings, and civil rights suppression. Many were recruited for jobs with the Pennsylvania Railroad. African Americans have played a central role in Florida's development since the colonial era, contributing to military defense, agriculture, and community building. The Florida Department of State notes that Black communities established some of the earliest schools, churches, and civic organizations in the region. In St. Petersburg, African American women such as nurse Marie Yopp and beautician Edna Williams helped strengthen their communities through mentoring, organizing, and efforts to improve women's economic and social opportunities.

=== Boom of 1920s ===
The 1920s were a prosperous time for much of the nation, including Florida. The state's new railroads opened up large areas to development, spurring the Florida land boom of the 1920s. Investors of all kinds, many from outside Florida, raced to buy and sell rapidly appreciating land in newly platted communities such as Miami and Palm Beach. Led by entrepreneurs Carl Fisher and George Merrick, Miami was transformed by land speculation and ambitious building projects into an emerging metropolis. A growing awareness in the areas surrounding Florida, along with the Northeast about the attractive south Florida winter climate, along with local promotion of speculative investing, spurred the boom.

A majority of the people who bought land in Florida hired intermediaries to accomplish the transactions. By 1924, the main issues in state elections were how to attract more industry and the need to build and maintain good roads for tourists. During the time frame, the population grew from less than one million in 1920, to 1,263,540 in 1925.

By 1925, the market ran out of buyers to pay the high prices, and soon the boom became a bust. The 1926 Miami Hurricane, which nearly destroyed the city further depressed the real estate market. In 1928 another hurricane struck Southern Florida. The 1928 Okeechobee hurricane made landfall near Palm Beach, severely damaging the local infrastructure. In townships near Lake Okeechobee, the storm breached a dike separating the water from land, creating a storm surge that killed over 2,000 people and destroying the towns of Belle Glade and Pahokee.

Tourists continued to arrive in Florida by train. The introduction of the automobile resulted in an increased number traveling on sometimes macadamized, sometimes dirt roads. The destination was usually Miami or Miami Beach. Roadside attractions included orange shops and alligator wrestling. Tourism was confined to the winter months. Summers were uncomfortably hot for visitors.

=== Prohibition ===
Prohibition had been popular in north Florida, but was opposed in the rest of the south, which became a haven for speakeasies and rum-runners in the 1920s. During 1928–32 a broad coalition of judges, lawyers, politicians, journalists, brewers, hoteliers, retailers, and ordinary Floridians organized to try to repeal the ban on alcohol. When the federal government legalized near beer and light wine in 1933, the wet coalition launched a successful campaign to legalize these beverages at the state level.

Florida stood out as the only state to elect a governor affiliated with the prohibition party. During this time, it contributed to an increase bootlegging, defiance of alcohol restriction, and the Florida's moonshining culture.

Floridians subsequently joined in the national campaign to repeal the 18th Amendment, which succeeded in December 1933. The following November, state voters repealed Florida's constitutional ban on liquor and gave local governments the power to legalize or outlaw alcoholic beverages.

=== Great Depression ===
The Great Depression began with the Stock Market crash of 1929. By that time, the economy had already declined in much of Florida from the collapse three years earlier of the land boom. During the late 1920s and early 1930s Florida would face a variety of problems with some of them stemming from the collapse of the Florida Land Boom and the Great Depression. Two hurricanes with one occurring in 1926 and another in 1928 would hurt the state further economically. The state government would be in debt which was then a violation of Florida's Constitution and over 150 municipalities would also be in debt as they had defaulted on their municipal bonds which had mainly been issued as a way to pay for infrastructure during the Florida land boom. Many property owners often owed taxes to local governments which further worsened the situation. A separate issue would be with Florida's virgin timber crop being virtually cut down by the 1930s.

During the New Deal (1933–40) a variety of projects would be built by the Works Progress Administration (WPA). There would be work camps for the young men of the Civilian Conservation Corps (CCC). Apart from the New Deal being implemented, Florida would see David Sholtz become elected as Governor in 1932. As governor, he would manage to implement social welfare programs while simultaneously expanding the amount of tax revenue received by the state government and getting it out of debt. He would also be strongly aligned with President Franklin Delano Roosevelt and was a personal friend of his. Toward the end of Sholtz's tenure his reputation among Floridians which was previously positive would decline as his ethics became questioned. As a result, Fred P. Cone would become elected as governor in 1936. While being governor he would be incredibly hands-off and had a fiscally conservative approach.

From 1930 to 1935, college students selected Fort Lauderdale, Daytona Beach, and Panama City Beach as great places to take a spring break and party. The 1960s film Where the Boys Are increased attendance in Fort Lauderdale to 50,000 annually. When this figure increased to 250,000 in 1985, the city began to pass laws restricting student activities. As a result, students moved to Daytona Beach from 1980 to 1990s. The figure for Fort Lauderdale dropped to 20,000; 350,000 visited Daytona Beach. Daytona Beach passed laws constraining underage drinking. Students then began patronizing Panama City, where 500,000 visited in 2013.

Florida legalized gambling in 1931 allowing a parimutuel betting establishment. By 2014, there were 30 such establishments, generating $200 million in state taxes and fees.

Anticipating war, the Army and Navy decided to use the state as a primary training area. The Navy chose the coastal areas, the Army, the inland areas.

In 1940, the population was about 1.5 million. Average annual income was $308 ($7,078.15 in 2025 dollars).

=== World War II and the development of the space industry ===
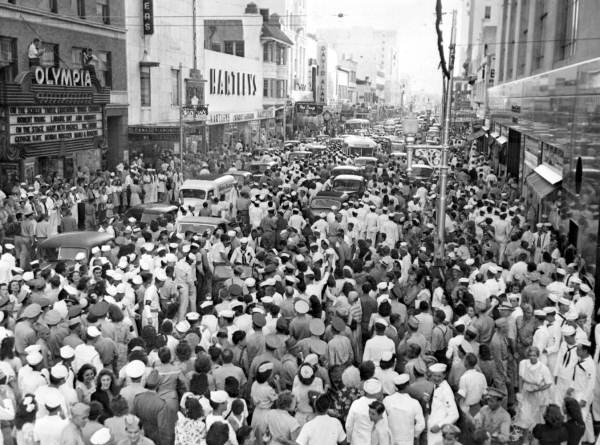
Soldiers and crowds in Downtown Miami 20 minutes after Japan's surrender ending World War II (1945).

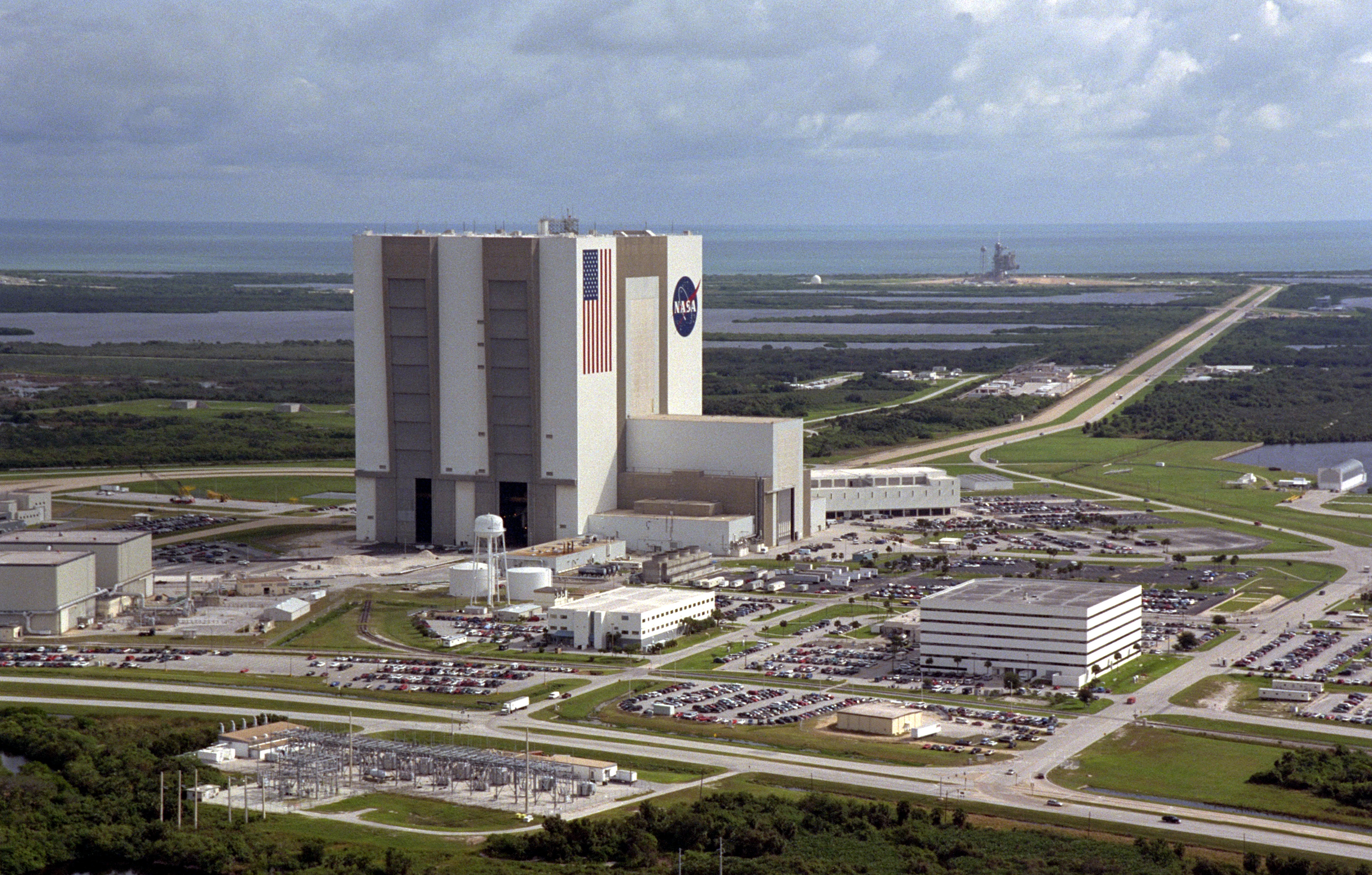
Kennedy Space Center.

Prior to the United States entering World War II, Florida was found in polling by Gallup to be among the most supportive states for interventionism. In the years leading up to World War II, 100 ships were sunk off the coast of Florida. More ships sank after the country entered the war. About 248,000 Floridians served in the war. Around 50,000 of these were African Americans.

During the war, shipbuilding would make up two-thirds of all industrial growth seen in the state. Thousands of people would be hired by shipbuilding companies during the war to work in Pensacola, Panama City, Jacksonville and Tampa. There would be labor shortages during the war as many of those who worked at industrial jobs were now serving in the military. Local and migrant laborers who worked in the orchards and field would end up leaving for higher paying jobs.

The state became a major hub for the United States Armed Forces. Naval Air Station Pensacola was originally established as a naval station in 1826 and became the first American naval aviation facility in 1917. The entire nation mobilized for World War II and many bases, especially air bases, were established in Florida, to include:

- Naval Air Station Whiting Field
- Naval Air Station Ellyson Field
- Tyndall Field
- Dale Mabry Army Airfield
- Naval Air Station Jacksonville
- Naval Station Mayport
- Naval Air Station Cecil Field
- Camp Blanding
- Naval Air Station Daytona Beach
- Naval Air Station DeLand
- Naval Air Station Sanford
- Orlando Army Air Base
- Pinecastle Army Airfield
- Kissimmee Army Airfield
- Naval Air Station Banana River
- Naval Air Station Melbourne
- Lakeland Army Airfield
- Naval Air Station Fort Lauderdale
- Naval Air Station Miami
- Naval Air Station Richmond
- Page Field Army Airfield
- Naval Air Station Key West
- Naval Station Key West
- Homestead Army Air Field

Numerous others were also established that exist today as military installations/facilities, civilian airports, or other facilities under different names.

Present day Eglin Air Force Base, Hurlburt Field, and MacDill Air Force Base (now the home of U.S. Central Command and U.S. Special Operations Command) were also developed as U.S. Army Air Forces installations during this time. During the Cold War, Florida's coastal access and proximity to Cuba encouraged the development of these and other military facilities. Since the end of the Cold War, the military has closed some facilities, including major bases such as NAS Sanford, McCoy AFB, NAS Cecil Field, and NTC Orlando, and realigned others such as Homestead AFB being transferred to the Air Force Reserve Command and realigned as Homestead Air Reserve Base, or NAS Saufley Field realigned as NETPDC Saufley Field, but their presence is still significant in the state and local economies.

Apart from military bases, Florida would also be home to 22 prisoner of war camps. Starting in May 1943, the Allied powers would send captured Nazi soldiers to the United States with about of 10,000 of them going to 22 camps in Florida. Many of these camps would be located in or near military bases.

The population increased by 46% during the 1940s.

Because of Cape Canaveral's relative closeness to the equator, compared to other potential locations, it was chosen in 1949 as a test site for the country's nascent missile program. Patrick Space Force Base and the Cape Canaveral Space Force Station launch site began to take shape as the 1950s progressed. By the early 1960s, the Space Race was in full swing. As programs were expanded and employees joined, the space program generated a huge boom in the communities around Cape Canaveral. This area is now collectively known as the Space Coast and features the Kennedy Space Center. It is also a major center of the aerospace industry. To date, all crewed orbital spaceflights launched by the United States, including those that carried the only persons to visit the Moon, have been launched from Kennedy Space Center. As the space program expanded in Florida, it also became a site of political activism; on July 15, 1969, civil rights leader Ralph Abernathy led a Poor People's Campaign protest at Cape Canaveral ahead of the Apollo 11 launch.

=== Post-World War II growth, changes and the Civil Rights Movement ===
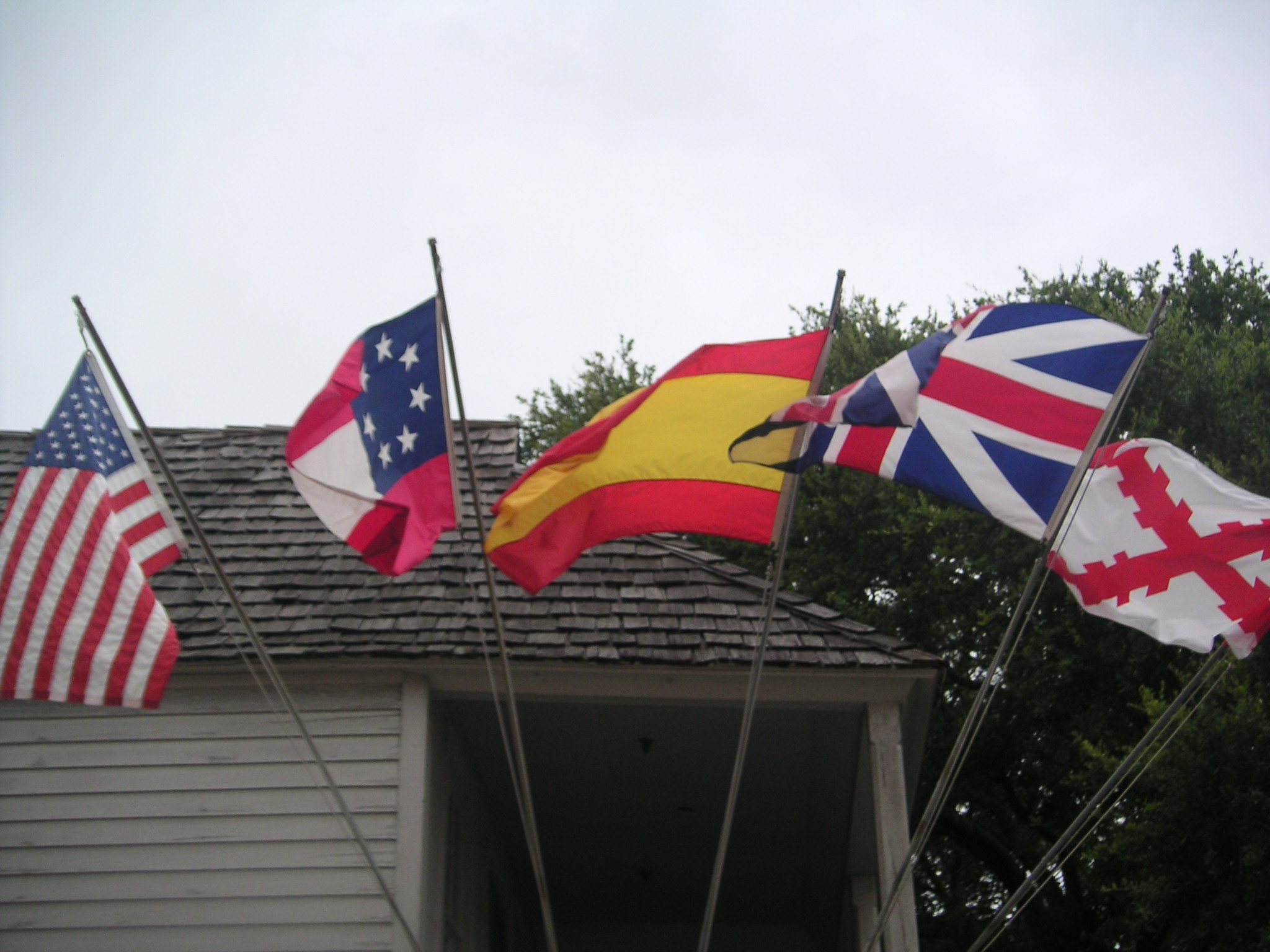
Five flags of Florida, not including the current State Flag.

Florida's population mix has changed. After World War II, Florida was transformed as the development of air conditioning and the Interstate highway system encouraged migration by residents of the North and Midwest.

In 1950, Florida was ranked twentieth among the states in population; 50 years later it was ranked fourth, and 14 years later was number three. Due to low tax rates and warm climate, Florida became the destination for many retirees from the Northeast, Midwest and Canada.

Prior to development, Florida salt marshes were capable of producing large numbers of mosquitoes. The salt marsh mosquito does not lay its eggs in standing water, preferring moist sand or mud instead. Biologists learned to control them by "source reduction", the process of removing the moist sand needed by the mosquitoes to breed. To achieve this goal, large sections of coastal marshes were either ditched or diked to remove the moist sand that the mosquitoes required to lay eggs on. Together with chemical controls, it yielded a qualified success.

Dramatic changes would also be seen economically in Florida. Agricultural grew during the postwar years and even outpaced the growth of tourism in the state until 1965 when Walt Disney announced the creation of Walt Disney World. Citrus growers doubled their output, cattle ranching expanded in the Kissimmee Valley and farmers began to cultivate the Everglades Agricultural Area with sugar being the most prominent crop. Sugarcane cultivation would begin to grow significantly in that area after the United States placed an embargo on Cuban sugar in 1959 (Cuba was the main supplier of sugar to the United States) and repealed the Sugar Act's limits on domestic production. Tourism grew in Florida from 3 million visitors to over 15 million by 1965.

=== Air conditioning and population growth ===
The introduction of air conditioning in the mid-20th century transformed Florida's population and economy. Once considered too hot and humid for large-scale settlement, Florida became a popular destination for retirees and tourists. Between 1946 and 2022, the state's population grew ninefold, driving rapid urbanization and economic change.

==== Changes in demographics ====
In the early postwar period, the state's population had changed markedly by migration of new groups, as well as emigration of African Americans, 40,000 of whom moved north in earlier decades of the 20th century during the Great Migration. By 1960 the number of African Americans in Florida had increased to 880,186, but declined proportionally to 18% of the state's population. This was a much smaller proportion than in 1900, when the census showed they comprised 44% of the state's population, while numbering 230,730 persons. The median age would also end up increasing as the state became a popular destination for retirees; going from 28.8 in 1950 to 39.3 by 2000.

The Cuban Revolution of 1959 resulted in a large wave of Cuban immigration into South Florida, which transformed Miami into a major center of commerce, finance and transportation for all of Latin America. Emigration from Haiti, other Caribbean states, and Central and South America continues to the present day.

The population of Asian-Americans increased in Florida during the postwar years, growing from 1,142 counted by the US Census Bureau in 1950 to 154,302 by 1990. During the 1970s and 1980s Asian-Americans would end up becoming the largest foreign-born group of people in Florida.

==== Civil Rights movement ====
Like other states in the South, Florida had many African-American leaders who were active in the civil rights movement. In the 1940s and '50s, a new generation started working on issues, emboldened by veterans who had fought during World War II and wanted to gain more civil rights. Harry T. Moore built the National Association for the Advancement of Colored People (NAACP) in Florida, rapidly increasing its membership to 10,000. Because Florida's voter laws were not as restrictive as those of Georgia and Alabama, he had some success in registering black voters. In the 1940s he increased voter registration among black people from 5 to 31% of those age-eligible.

But the state had white groups who resisted change, to the point of attacking and killing black people. In December 1951 whites bombed the house of activists Harry Moore and his wife Harriette, who both died of injuries from the blast. Although their murders were not solved then, a state investigation in 2006 reported they had been killed by an independent unit of the Ku Klux Klan. Numerous bombings were directed against African Americans in 1951–1952 in Florida.

=== 2000 presidential election controversy ===
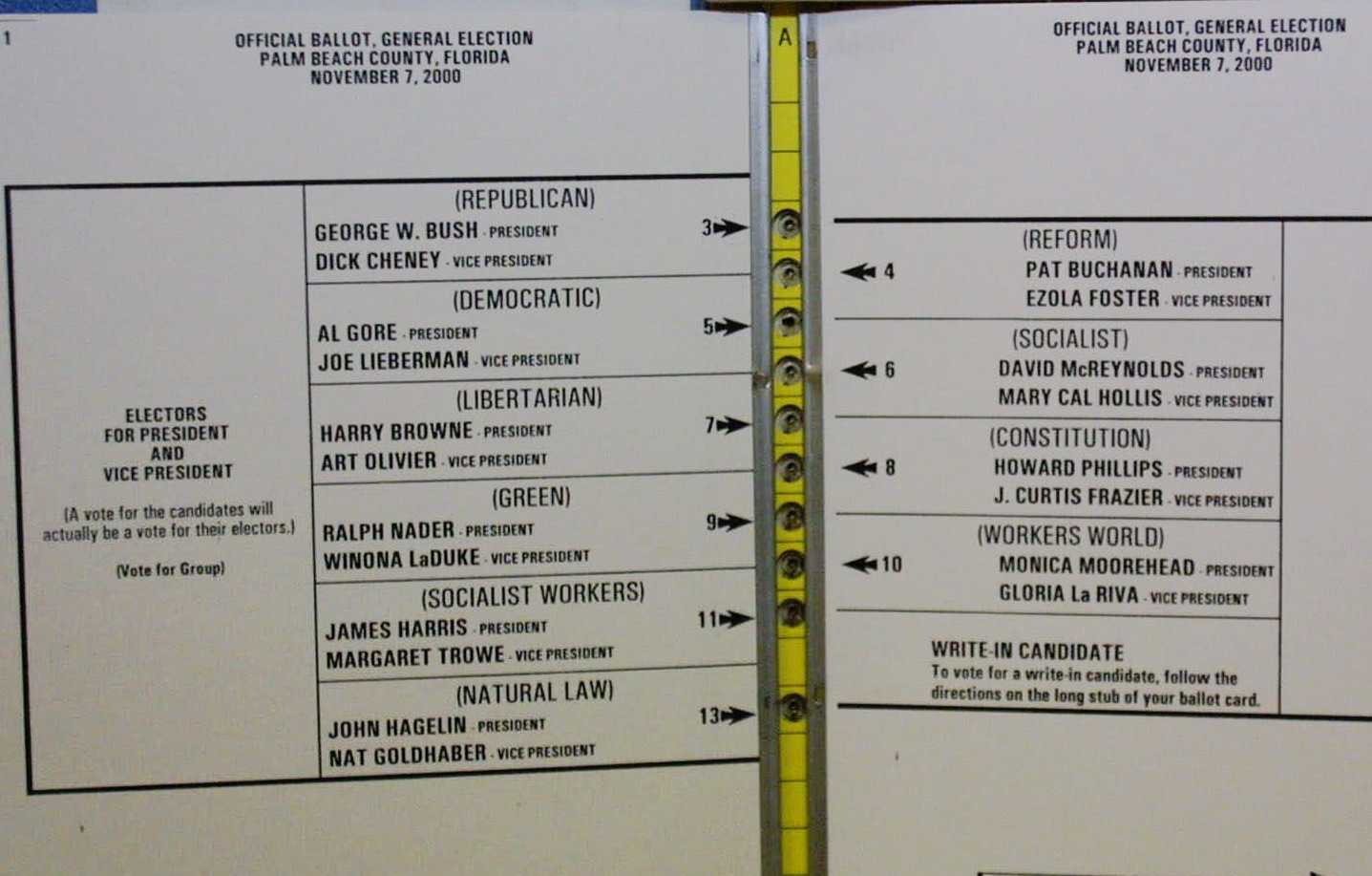
"Butterfly ballot"

Florida became the battleground of the controversial 2000 US presidential election which took place on November 7, 2000. The count of the popular votes was extremely close, triggering automatic recounts. These recounts triggered accusations of fraud and manipulation, and brought to light voting irregularities in the state.

Subsequent recount efforts degenerated into arguments over mispunched ballots, "hanging chads", and controversial decisions by Florida Secretary of State Katherine Harris and the Florida Supreme Court. Ultimately, the United States Supreme Court ruled in Bush v. Gore to end all recounts, allowing Harris to certify the election results. The final official Florida count gave the victory to George W. Bush over Al Gore by 537 votes, a 0.009% margin of difference. The process was extremely divisive, and led to calls for electoral reform in Florida.

=== Everglades, hurricanes, drilling and the environment ===
Long-term scientific attention has focused on the fragility of the Everglades. In 2000 Congress authorized the Comprehensive Everglades Restoration Plan (CERP) at $8 billion. The goals are to restore the health of the Everglades ecosystem and maximize the value to people of its land, water, and soil.

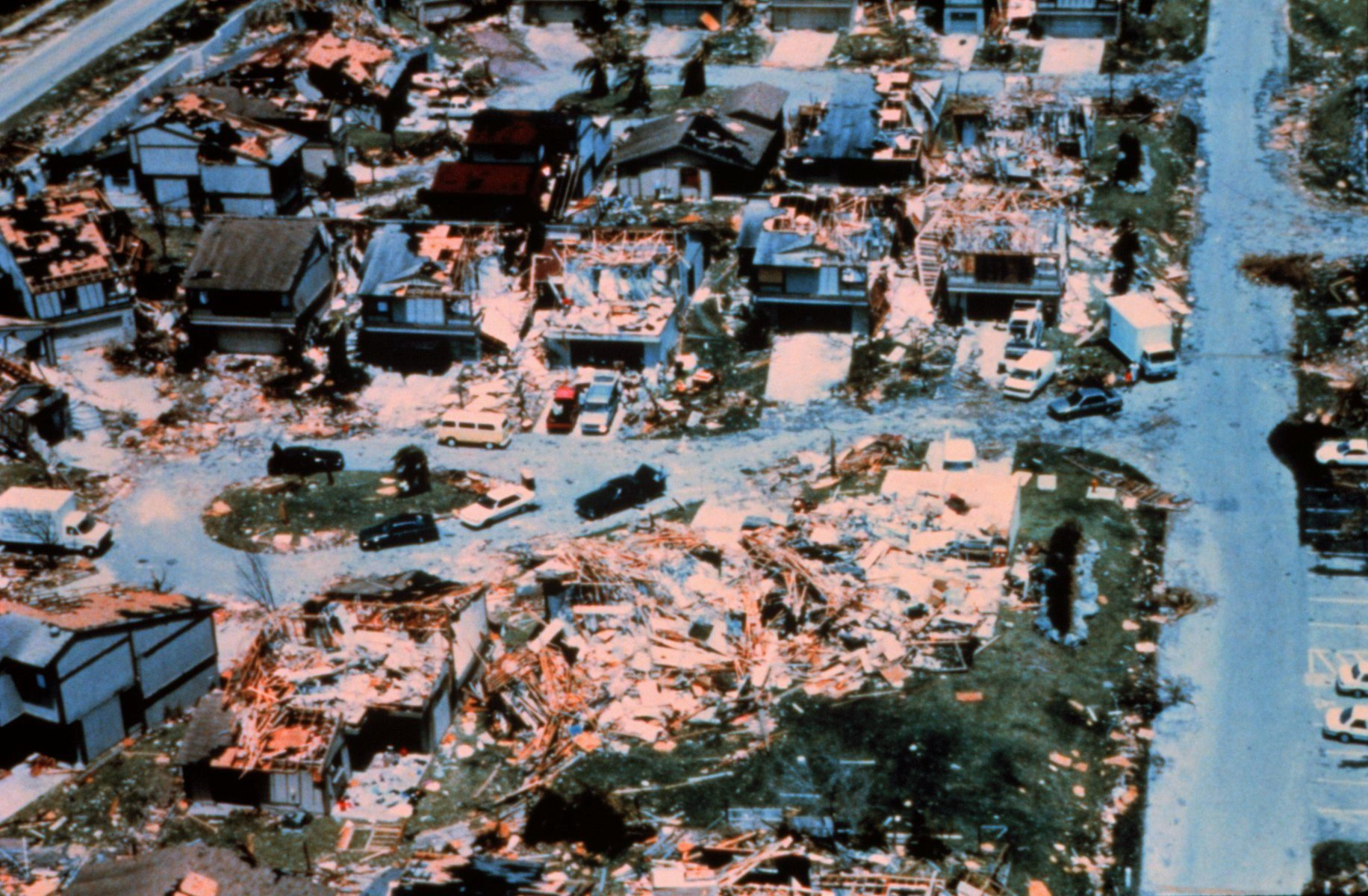
Destruction in Lakes by the Bay near Miami following Hurricane Andrew

Hurricane Andrew in August 1992 struck Homestead, just south of Miami, as a Category 5 hurricane, leaving forty people dead, 100,000 homes damaged or destroyed, more than a million people left without electricity, and damages of $20–30 billion. Much of South Florida's sensitive vegetation was severely damaged. The region had not seen a storm of such power in decades. Besides heavy property damage, the hurricane nearly destroyed the region's insurance industry.

The western panhandle was damaged heavily in 1995, with hurricanes Allison, Erin, and Opal hitting the area within the span of a few months. The storms increased in strength during the season, culminating with Opal's landfall as a Category 3 in October.

Florida also suffered heavily during the 2004 Atlantic hurricane season, when four major storms struck the state. Hurricane Charley made landfall in Charlotte County area and cut northward through the peninsula, Hurricane Frances struck the Atlantic coast and drenched most of central Florida with heavy rains, Hurricane Ivan caused heavy damage in the western Panhandle, and Hurricane Jeanne caused damage to the same area as Frances, including compounded beach erosion. Damage from all four storms was estimated to be at least $22 billion, with some estimates going as high as $40 billion. In 2005, South Florida was struck by Hurricanes Katrina and Wilma. The panhandle was struck by Hurricane Dennis.

In 2016, Hurricane Matthew paralleled the east coast and caused an estimated $10 billion in damage. In 2017, Hurricane Irma made a catastrophic category 4 landfall in the Florida Keys, followed by a category 3 landfall in Collier County. Irma caused over $50 billion in damage in Florida, making it the costliest in Floridian history, until being surpassed by Hurricane Ian in 2022. In 2018, Hurricane Michael hit the Florida Panhandle as a Category 5, the first landfall at that intensity in the United States since Hurricane Andrew in 1992. It caused over $20 billion in damage in Florida. In 2022, Hurricane Ian made landfall in Lee County, killing 146 people and causing over $113 billion in damage, making it the costliest hurricane to ever hit Florida and the deadliest since the 1935 Labor Day Hurricane. The most recent hurricane to hit Florida was Hurricane Milton, which made landfall just south of Tampa Bay at Siesta Key on October 9, 2024.

Florida has historically been at risk from hurricanes and tropical storms. These have resulted in higher risks and property damage as the concentration of population and development has increased along Florida's coastal areas. Not only are more people and property at risk, but development has overtaken the natural system of wetlands and waterways, which used to absorb some of the storms' energy and excess waters.

Environmental issues include preservation and restoration of the Everglades, which has moved slowly. There has been pressure by industry groups to drill for oil in the eastern Gulf of Mexico but so far, large-scale drilling off the coasts of Florida has been prevented. The federal government declared the state an agricultural disaster area because of 13 straight days of freezing weather during the growing season in January 2010.

In the early 20th century engineers from the Everglades Drainage District that was created in 1913 commissioned a large scale drainage of the Florida Everglades that was economically feasible. The commission would reclaim land for agriculture by building an extensive canal system and its outcome significantly altered the natural flow of water.

Oranges have been grown and sold in Florida since 1872. Production dropped 59% from the 2008–09 season to the 2016–17 season. The decline was mostly due to canker, citrus greening disease, and hurricane damage.

=== Fishing ===
The end of World War 2 gave rise to an influx of the ideal version of Florida and provided a new means of enrichment and eventual revenue: fishing. Florida's new popularity as a tourist destination paved the way for many of the fishing attractions to gain favor with the public, becoming a common recreation for the late 19th century. The extent of this newfound pastime, however, led to concerns about the fish population, although it has since regained traction in recent years. The federal government believes this is due to federal restraints on fishing.

A major red tide occurred along Florida's coast from 1946 to 1947, during which scientist was able to identify the cause, which was a microscopic plankton Gymnodinium brevis that is now called karenia brevis that caused a widespread of fish deaths. The red tide has caused more than one million fish deaths and revealed the concentration of the organism in the coastal waters.

=== Infrastructure ===
Consistent with usage throughout the country, more than 51% of homes in Florida in 2015 use mobile phones or wireless only.

The American Society of Civil Engineers gave Florida a C grade for its overall infrastructure in 2021 and with them noting a strong transportation system but needing help in other areas. Florida infrastructure continues it face challenges in maintain roads, bridges, and other essential infrastructure.

== Tourism ==
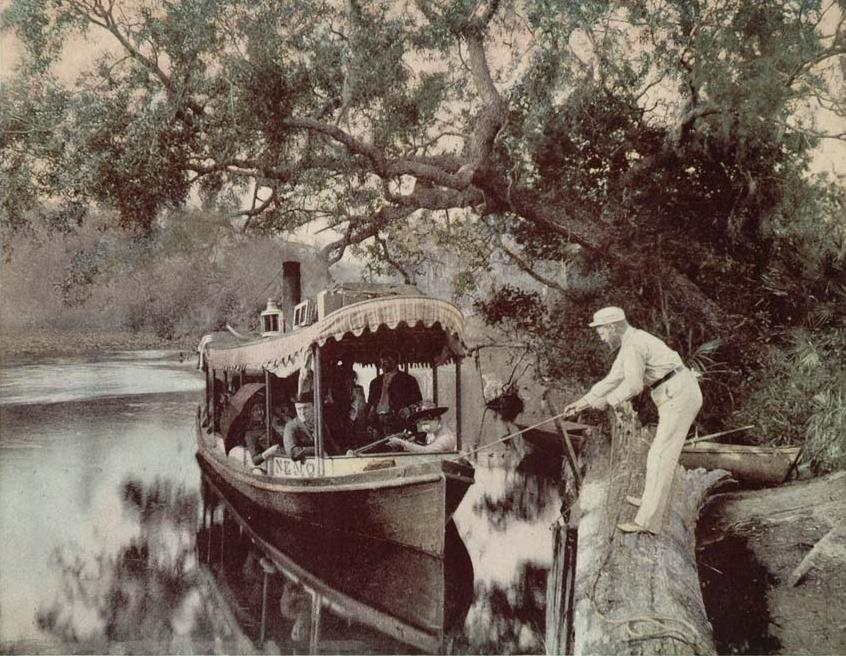
Tourists hunting in 1893

The tourism industry in the state of Florida has been around before and since the state's inception. Reconstruction efforts and the eye of industrialists in the area, however, were among what helped the state gain popularity in tourism. During the late 19th century, Florida became a popular tourist destination as Henry Flagler's railroads expanded into the area. In 1891, railroad magnate Henry Plant built the luxurious Tampa Bay Hotel in Tampa; the hotel was later adapted for use as the campus for the University of Tampa.

Flagler built the Florida East Coast Railway from Jacksonville to Key West. Along the route he provided grand accommodations for passengers, including the Ponce de Leon Hotel in St. Augustine, the Ormond Hotel in Ormond Beach, the Royal Poinciana Hotel and the Breakers Hotel in Palm Beach, and the Royal Palm Hotel in Miami.

In February 1888, Florida had a special tourist: President Grover Cleveland, the first lady, and his party visited Florida for a couple of days. He visited the Subtropical Exposition in Jacksonville, where he made a speech supporting tourism to the state; he took a train to St. Augustine, meeting Henry Flagler; and a train to Titusville, where he boarded a steamboat and visited Rockledge. On his return trip, he visited Sanford and Winter Park.

Flagler's railroad connected cities on the east coast of Florida. This created more urbanization along that corridor. Development also followed the construction of Turnpikes I-95 in east Florida, and I-75 in west Florida. These routes aided tourism and urbanization. Northerners from the East Coast used I-95 and tended to settle along that route. People from the MidWest tended to use I-75, and settled along the west coast of Florida.

Snowbirds

"Snowbirds", often elderly, are people who migrate from colder northern areas to the warmth of Florida in peak travel seasons such as winter or fall. In 2005, Florida is estimated to have seen more than 800,000 elderly temporary snowbirds and more than 300,000 out-migrant elderly.

Florida universities

The University of Florida was started in 1853, with its official creation in 1905, its campus location in Gainesville, Florida decided 1906, and then classes began September 26, 1906.

The University of South Florida was founded in 1956 with the first day of classes being September 26, 1960.

In 1897, Florida State University was formed as the first liberal arts college in the state and in 1901 it became "Florida State College". FSU has been through many name changes in its creation, in 1909 it became "Florida State College for Women" and In 1947 it was formally changed to Florida State University.

University of Central Florida was founded in 1963 under the name "Florida Technological University" and its first day of classes was October 7, 1968.

Other notable Florida universities include:

Florida International University

University of Miami

Florida Atlantic University

Southeastern University

Florida Southern College

=== Theme parks ===
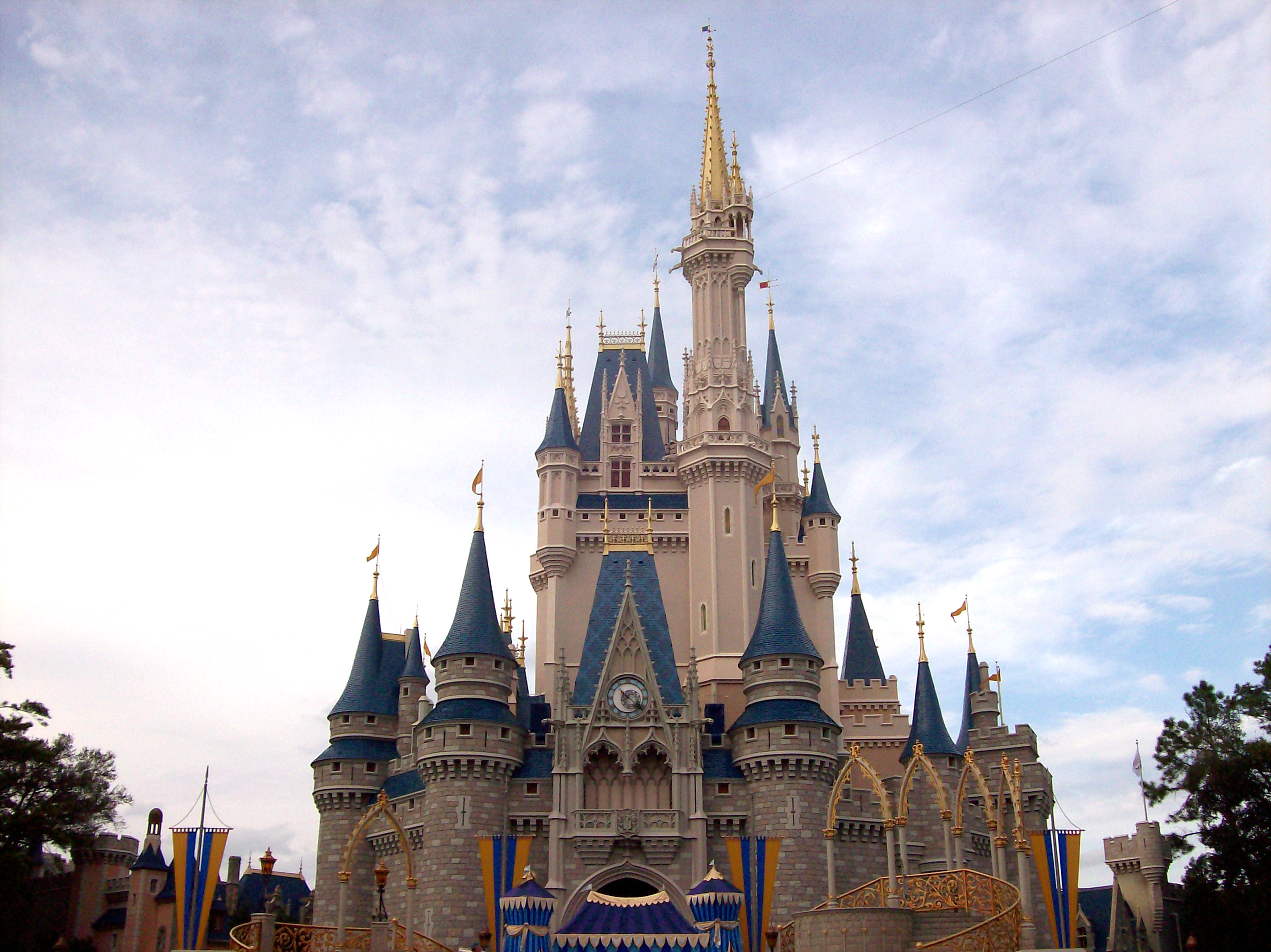
Magic Kingdom at Walt Disney World Resort

Florida's first theme parks were developed in the 1930s and included Cypress Gardens (1936) near Winter Haven, and Marineland (1938) near St. Augustine. In 2004, Cypress Gardens was added to the U.S. National Register of Historic places. The original Cypress Gardens closed in 2009, but in 2011 it was incorporated into the new Legoland Florida Resort. Another popular theme park is Busch Gardens in Tampa, which was opened in 1959 and is both a zoo and an amusement park. It is known for its vast collection of animal life and its iconic rides, including the Phoenix Rising, which is the tallest and longest family inverted roller coaster in North America.

==== Walt Disney World ====
Walt Disney selected Orlando over several other sites for an updated and expanded version of his Disneyland Park in California. In 1971, five years after Disney's death, the Magic Kingdom, the first component of the Walt Disney World complex, opened and became Florida's best-known attraction, attracting tens of millions of visitors a year. It stimulated the development of other attractions, as well as large tracts of housing and related businesses.

Disney and his executives had researched the area under aliases and a borrowed jet. As the project advanced, they received some backlash from local residents, who saw dwindling opportunities for natural attractions such as the Florida Springs and beaches to flourish.

Disney World has four theme parks, the Magic Kingdom, Epcot, Disney's Hollywood Studios, and Disney's Animal Kingdom with more than two dozen hotels on-property. Some of its most notable attractions include Space Mountain, Tower of Terror, Expedition Everest, and Pandora – The World of Avatar.

In 2024, Walt Disney World saw over 49 million combined visitors with 17.8 million at the Magic Kingdom alone. The crowds come for not only attractions, but also the "magical vibe" Disney has marketed. From its beginnings, Disney World has gained market share through their advertising, decorations, attractions, food, and resorts.

After Walt Disney World opened, the Orlando area became an international resort and convention destination, featuring a wide variety of themed parks. Other area theme parks include Universal Orlando Resort and SeaWorld.

=== Boating ===
In 2017, 50,000 vessels were damaged by Hurricane Irma. This resulted in about $500 million worth of damage, predominately in the Florida Keys.

Recreational boating in the Everglades National Park has increased by about 2 to 2.5 times between 1970 and 2007 and this would lead to a substantial ecological pressure. This is because boat propellers physically uproot and scar the seagrass bed and with recovery often taking several years after the seagrass is damaged.

== See also ==
- Florida Historical Society
- History of the Southern United States
- Indigenous people of the Everglades region
- List of historical societies in Florida
- Maritime History of Florida
- Museum of Florida History
- Pensacola Museum of History
- State Library and Archives of Florida
- Women's suffrage in Florida

History of places in Florida

- History of Brevard County, Florida
- History of Fort Lauderdale, Florida
- History of Jacksonville, Florida
- History of Key West
- History of Miami
- Timeline of Orlando, Florida
- History of Pensacola, Florida
- History of Sarasota, Florida
- History of St. Petersburg, Florida
- History of Tampa, Florida
- History of Tallahassee, Florida
- History of West Palm Beach, Florida
- History of Ybor City
