= Bolivians in Washington, D.C. =

Washington, D.C. is home to the largest community of Bolivian Americans in the United States of America. The city and metropolitan area is recognized as a gateway for Bolivian immigration and a place of long-term community formation.

== History ==
Bolivian mass migration to Washington, D.C. began in two distinct waves, prompted by various factors in both areas.

=== First wave (1950s) ===
Bolivians began migrating to the United States in large numbers in the years following the Bolivian National Revolution in 1952. This migration saw many upper- and middle-class Bolivians seeking greater opportunities in the United States.

Following the victory of the Revolutionary Nationalist Movement, many of Bolivia's upper class were drawn to the United States, fearing political repression in Bolivia and desiring greater upward mobility. Washington, D.C. was an ideal destination for this migration, largely due to the presence of the Inter-American Development Bank and the then newly-formed Organization of American States. Though people from many Central and South American countries migrated to Washington, D.C. for similar reasons, the coincidence with the Bolivian National Revolution saw Bolivians disproportionately represented among immigrants in census polls at the time.

=== Second wave (1980s) ===
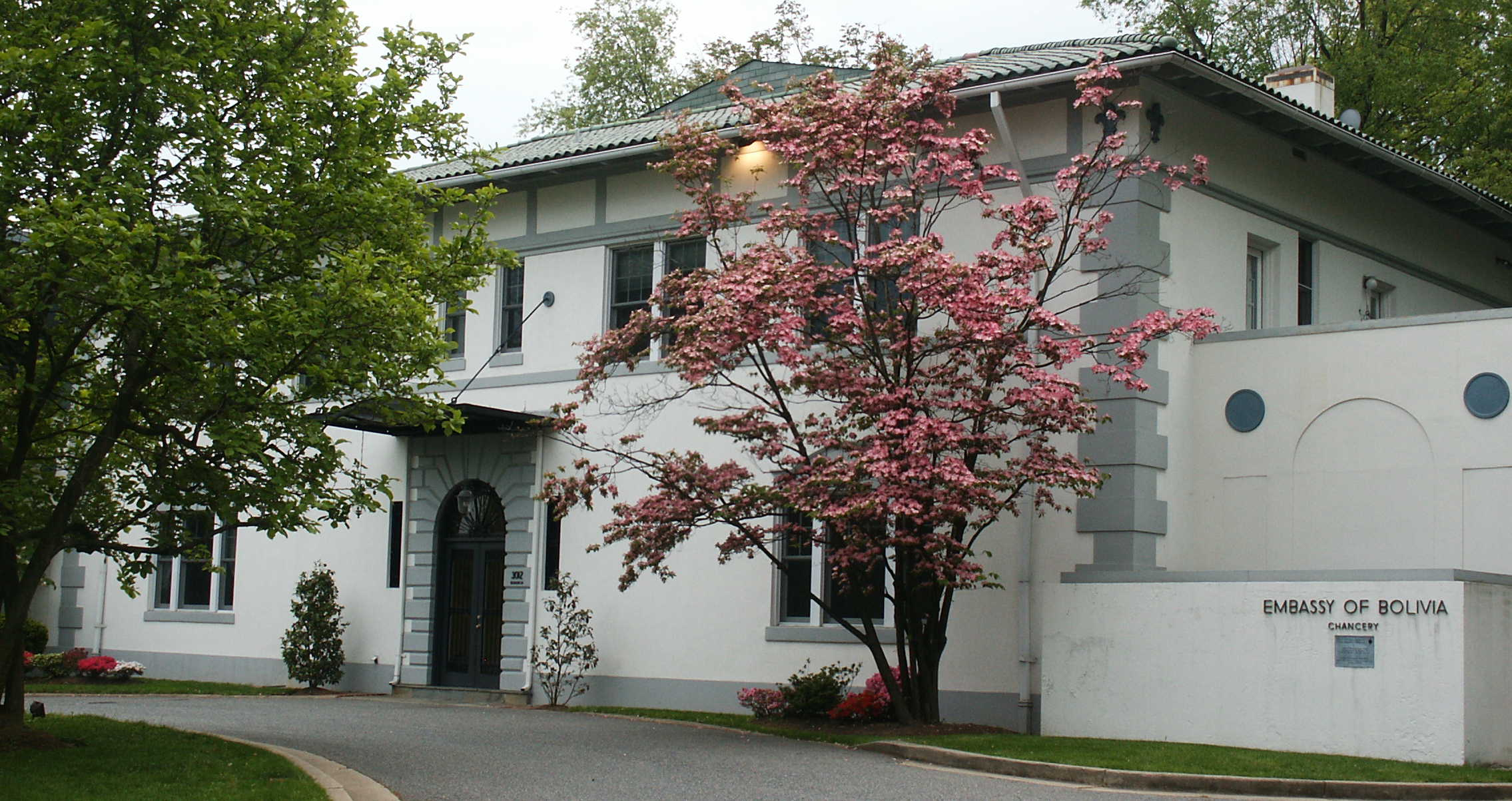
Bolivian embassy in Washington, D.C., est. 1890

The largest mass migration of Bolivians to Washington, D.C. occurred in the early 1980s, largely due to a nationwide financial crisis. As such, this wave of migration saw a greater number of lower- and working-class Bolivians migrate to the United States, in contrast to the first wave.

Bolivian fiscal policy in the 1970s led to hyperinflation exceeding 20,000%, leading to mass layoffs and the destruction of the middle class. As a result, many Bolivians migrated to the United States in order to work and send remittances back home. Having already established a foothold in Washington, D.C., most Bolivian immigrants found a community awaiting them in the city, resulting in a chain migration.

During this time, Washington, D.C. also happened to be experiencing a financial boom in the Alexandria and Arlington sectors, making construction work easy to find. Many Bolivian immigrants secured jobs in these sectors.

== Little Bolivia (Washington, D.C.) ==
Arlington County, VA and its surrounding counties have become a cultural anchor for Bolivians in the United States. According to the 2020 United States Census, the area is home to over 31,000 Bolivian Americans—roughly 38% of their population in the United States. As such, the area has gained an identity as a Bolivian microcosm, often referred to as "Little Bolivia."

Little Bolivia sees annual celebrations of many major holidays and festivals of Bolivia, including Pascua Florida, la Fiesta de Urqupiña, and Carnaval de Oruro.

== See also ==
- Bolivian Americans
