= Electoral reform in Florida =

U.S. state electoral reform

Electoral reform in Florida refers to efforts to change the voting and election laws in the United States state of Florida.

== Ranked-choice voting ==
Voters in Sarasota, Florida voted to switch to ranked-choice voting in November 2007.

== Ballots ==
Florida came under pressure to reform its mechanical butterfly ballot system after that system was associated with a sufficient number of spoiled ballots to have decided the 2000 U.S. presidential election. The card punchers in some cases became clogged with chads which prevented ballots from punching completely through, resulting in an undervote. They were largely replaced with touchscreen electronic voting machines. A more recent requirement is for paper ballots or a voter-verified paper record of some type. Some counties are in process of transitioning away from DRE (Direct Recording Electronic voting machines), except possibly for certain persons with disabilities who need specific accommodations. SB7066, Amendment 834194, also contains language to control the use of BMDs (Ballot Marking Devices): "(41) “Voter interface device” means any device that communicates voting instructions and ballot information to a voter and allows the voter to select and vote for candidates and issues. A voter interface device may not be used to tabulate votes. Any vote tabulation must be based upon a subsequent scan of the marked marksense ballot or the voter-verifiable paper output after the voter interface device process has been completed." In light of the successful Russian hacking into the election systems of two Florida counties in the 2016 election, as documented in Volume 1 of the Mueller Report, additional attention is being focused on securing Florida voting systems and county electronic voter registration pollbooks prior to the 2020 election.

== Expansion of the electorate ==
Florida previously had rigorous felony disenfranchisement laws that denied approximately 400,000 people the privilege of voting In 2007, at the urging of Gov. Charlie Crist, the laws were relaxed, allowing hundreds of thousands of non-violent offenders to regain their voting rights after having served their prison terms. In 2018, Amendment 4 to the Florida Constitution was passed statewide by voters, and the laws were relaxed, which would allow most ex-felons (totally 1.4 million in Florida) to regain the right to vote. However, the 2019 Florida State Legislature, in direct contradiction to the expressed will of the voters, passed SB7066, which once again severely restricted the right of ex-felons to register to vote if they might still owe monies for court costs, fines, or restitution. Since the process of verifying what monies are still owed is extremely cumbersome, due to multiple information sources and records that may be non-existent or scattered in various departments, efforts are being made in some counties to streamline the verification process.

All qualified voters are allowed to vote absentee under Florida law.

== Allocation of electoral votes ==
In 2007, SB 2568 was introduced in the Florida Senate to join the National Popular Vote Interstate Compact and award Florida's 27 electoral votes to the winner of the nationwide popular vote. The bill failed.

== See also ==
- Electoral reform in the United States
