= Pascua Florida =

Annual celebration of European discovery of Florida

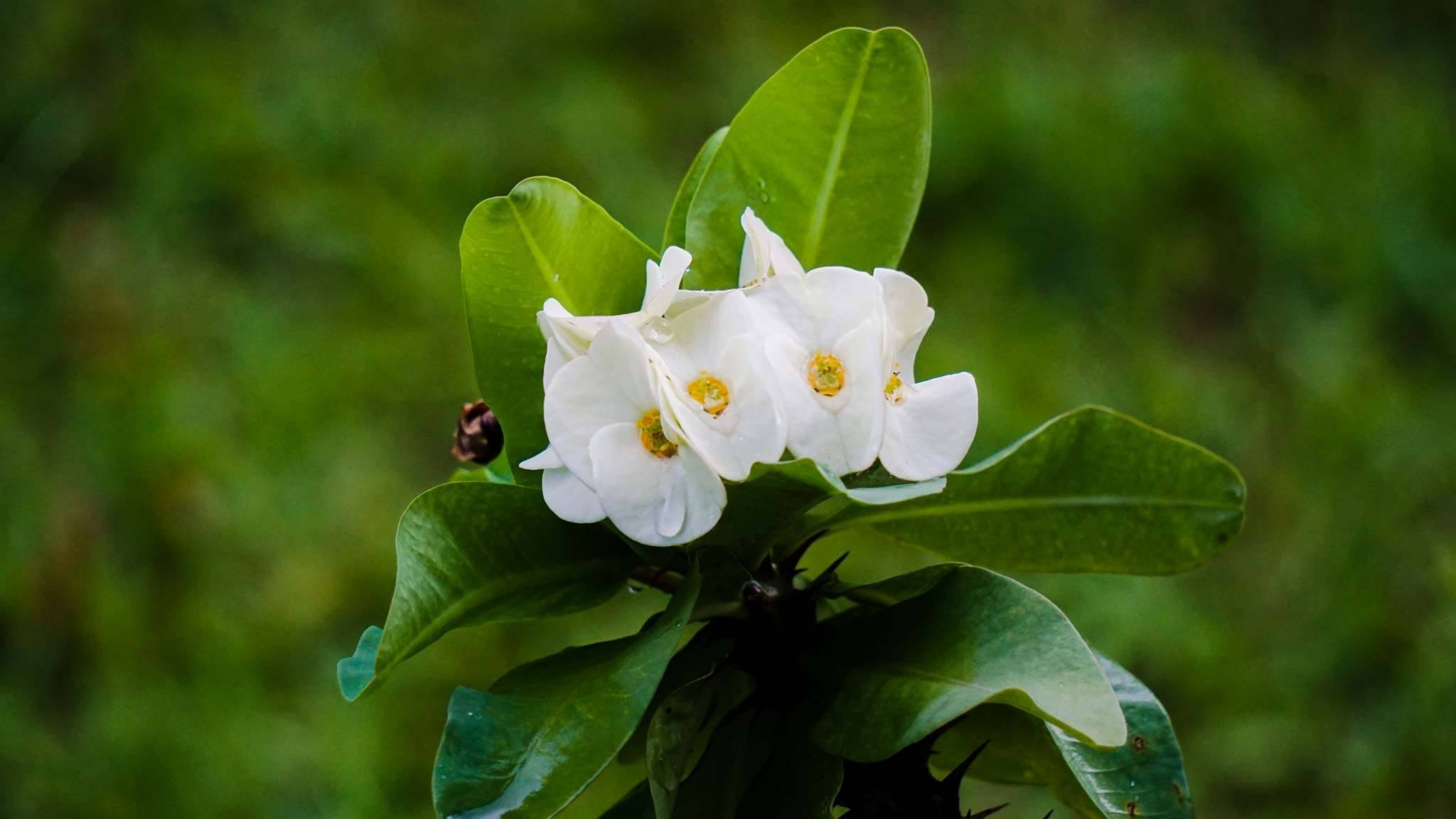
Flowers in the State of Florida

Pascua Florida (pronounced [ˈpaskwa floˈɾiða]) is an annual celebration of Juan Ponce de León's arrival in what is now the state of Florida in 1513. While the holiday is normally celebrated on April 2, it can fall on any date between the latter parts of March and the first week of April, depending on the day of the week April 2 falls on and/or the Governor's discretion. Pascua Florida Day is recognized as an official public (or legal) state holiday.

As it was the Easter season when Ponce de León first sighted land on his voyage of exploration, and because of the “beautiful view of the many cool woodlands", he called the peninsula, which he believed to be an island, la Pascua Florida. Pascua is short for Pascua de Resurrección, that is, Easter. According to the historian Gary R. Mormino, Ponce chose the name La Florida not only because of its lush landscape, but also because of the time of year, La Pascua Florida (The Paschal Season of Flowers). The Spanish term Pascua Florida is often translated loosely as "feast of flowers", for which the term Pascua de Flores is used in Spanish. The translators of Inca Garcilaso de la Vega say Easter was sometimes referred to as "Pascua Florida" because flowers generally appear in Spain at that time of year.

== Background ==
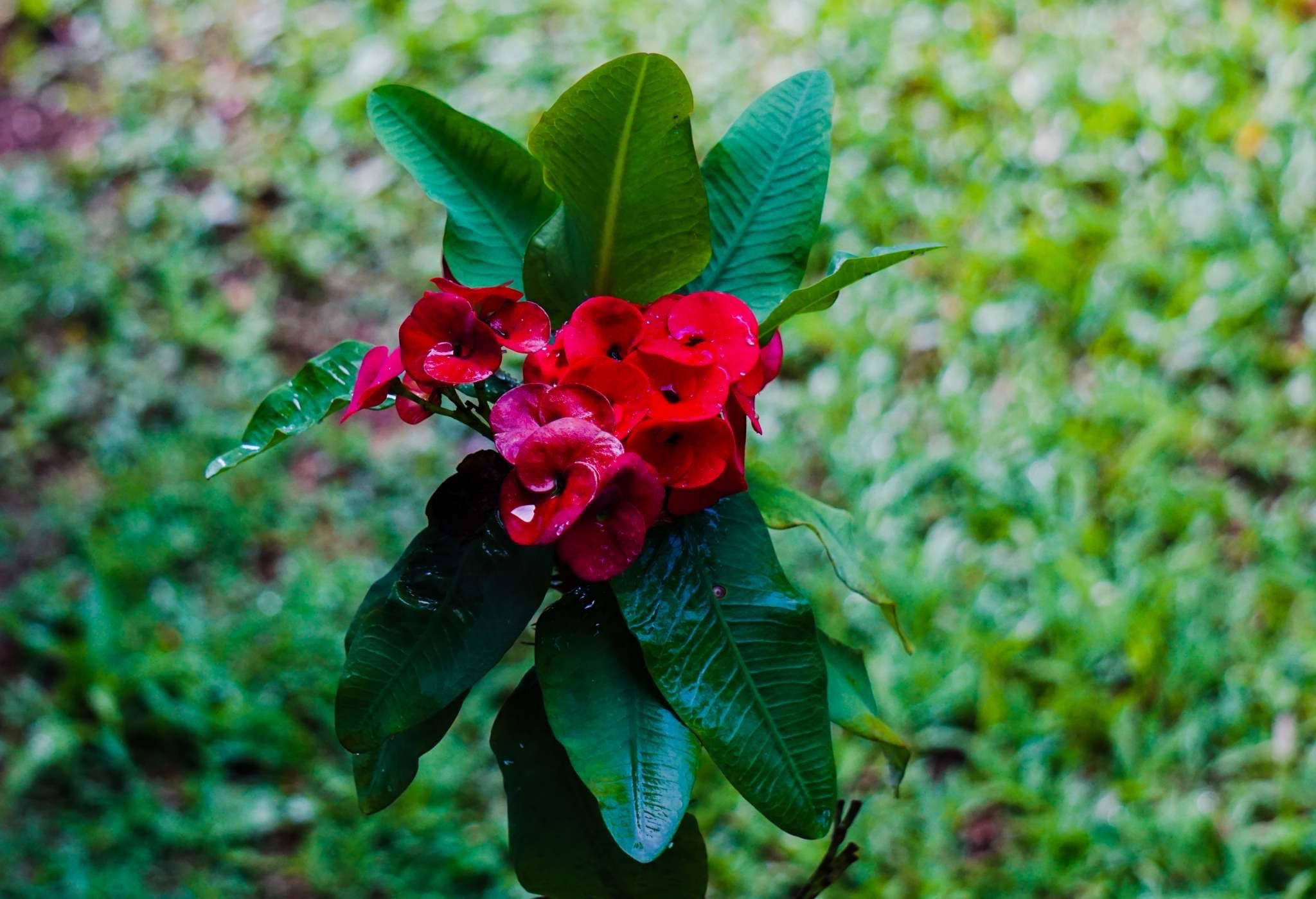
Flowers in Florida

Juan Ponce de León is the first known European to discover the area that is now known as Florida. His successful discovery of Puerto Rico during one of many Spanish expeditions for gold, mystical items and new lands, precipitated Spain's permission and encouragement to claim more lands in the new world. One such mystical item that lured him to what eventually happened to be Florida, was the Fountain of Youth.

Juan Ponce de León became governor of Puerto Rico during the early 1500s. The natives told him of an island that was rich in gold and had a magical fountain of water which would renew a person's health and youth. Intrigued, Ponce de Leon returned to Spain to seek the approval of the Spanish crown to search and explore the island, known by natives as Bimini. On February 23 of 1512, King Ferdinand approved Ponce de Leon's request to search for the island and by the 3rd of March in 1513, three ships left the Port of San German in Puerto Rico to search for the island of Bimini. He landed on Floridian shores some time during April 2 to April 8 and named the area "la Florida" in honor of "Pascua Florida", Spain's Easter time celebration. The expedition believed their discovery to be a large island and Ponce de Leon named the 'island' Pascua Florida.

== History of holiday ==
=== History and significance ===
Pascua Florida Day commemorates the arrival of Juan Ponce de León on the shores of the state of Florida in 1513. Florida has been called the "land of flowers" because of the connection to Ponce de Leon and Pascua Florida. Since its entry into legislature, the holiday, while having no specific celebratory acts, usually culminates in a period of retrospection of Florida's history and the preceding events that led to it.

=== Celebration ===
Pascua Florida Day is celebrated only in Florida. The holiday was adopted into Florida law on April 2 of 1953, at the suggestion of Mary A. Harrell, a Social Studies teacher in Jacksonville, Florida. From that point on, the week within which the holiday falls, usually March 27 to April 2, is dubbed Pascua Florida Week to honor Florida's history, and school children and adults alike, are urged to observe the time by partaking in commemorative exercises and programs.

=== Pascua Florida Day ===
Pascua Florida Day is usually celebrated on April 2 (the day on which Ponce de León first spotted Florida) unless it falls on a weekend, in which case the governor may declare either the preceding Friday or the following Monday as the state day. The Governor of Florida may issue an annual proclamation designating April 2 as the state day and designating the week of March 27 to April 2 as "Pascua Florida Week" and calling upon public schools and citizens of Florida to observe the same as a patriotic occasion.
