= January 1923 =

Month of 1923

| << | January 1923 | | | | | >> |
| Su | Mo | Tu | We | Th | Fr | Sa |
| | 1 | 2 | 3 | 4 | 5 | 6 |
| 7 | 8 | 9 | 10 | 11 | 12 | 13 |
| 14 | 15 | 16 | 17 | 18 | 19 | 20 |
| 21 | 22 | 23 | 24 | 25 | 26 | 27 |
| 28 | 29 | 30 | 31 |

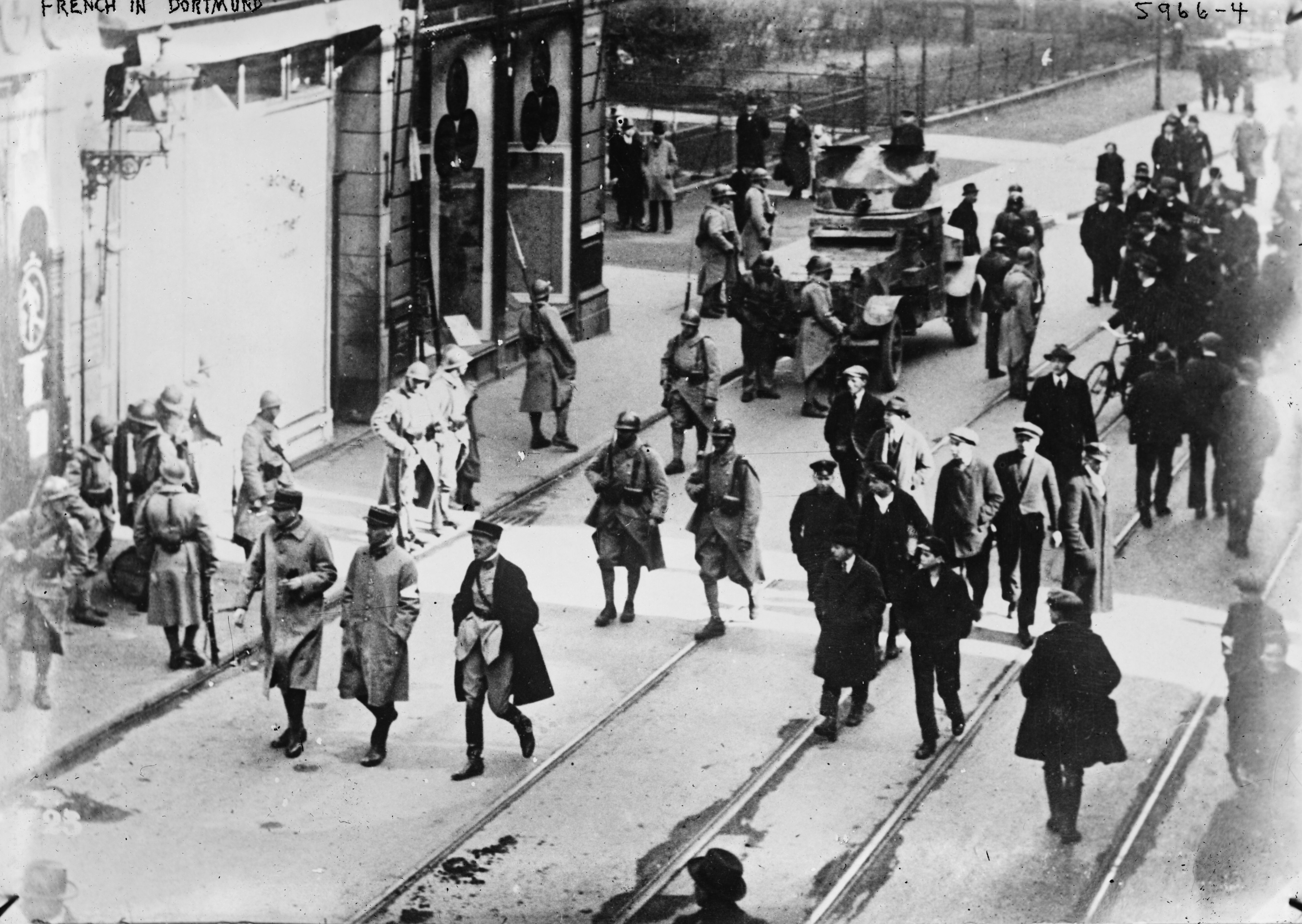
January 11, 1923: French Army begins occupation of Germany's Ruhr region to collect reparations

The following events occurred in January 1923:

== January 1, 1923 (Monday) ==
- The Rosewood Massacre began when racial violence erupted in Rosewood, Florida after a white woman accused a black man of assaulting her. When it was discovered that a black convict, Jesse Hunter, had escaped from a prison work gang, a posse of at least 200 white men from the neighboring white town of Sumner invaded Rosewood and made a house-to-house search for anyone who might be harboring the fugitive. By January 4, houses in Rosewood were being set afire, and four black and two white men had died.
- The Railways Act 1921 went into effect, consolidating 24 major British railway companies into four large regional companies. The new "Big Four" were Great Western Railway (GWR); London, Midland and Scottish Railway (LMS); London and North Eastern Railway (LNER); and Southern Railway (SR). With effect from January 1, 1948, the Big Four companies were nationalized to create British Railways (later renamed British Rail).
- L'Air Union was established as the largest airline in France by a merger between the airlines Compagnie des Messageries Aériennes (CMA) and Compagnie des Grands Express Aériens(CGEA). The new airline would merge with four other French airlines to become Air France on August 30, 1933.
- The first megachurch in the U.S., the 5,300-seat Angelus Temple was opened in the Echo Park neighborhood of Los Angeles by evangelist Aimee Semple McPherson.
- In the Rose Bowl football game, the USC Trojans beat the Penn State Nittany Lions, 14 to 3. The game was the first to be played in the new Rose Bowl Stadium in Pasadena, California and was attended by 53,000 people.
- In the first college football game between colleges in the U.S. and Cuba, the Tars of Rollins College (located in Winter Park, Florida near Orlando played a team representing the University of Havana and won, 80 to 0 in Miami.
- Born:
  - Takeshi Hirayama, Japanese epidemiologist and cancer researcher who made the first study showing a link between passive smoking ("second-hand smoke") and increased risk of lung cancer; in Kyoto) (d. 1995)
  - Valentina Cortese, Italian actress; as Valentina Elena Cortese Rossi di Coenzo, in Milan (d. 2019)
  - Vulo Radev, Bulgarian film director; in Lesidren, Bulgaria (d. 2001)
  - Roméo Sabourin, Canadian World War II spy; in Montreal (d. 1944)
  - Milt Jackson, American jazz musician; as Milton Jackson, in Detroit (d. 1999)
- Died: Willie Keeler, 50, American baseball player, died from heart failure (b. 1872)

== January 2, 1923 (Tuesday) ==
- The Legislative Council of Burma, the first measure of limited self-government for Burma and the first elected legislature there, opened with 80 of its 103 seats voted into office and the other 23 appointed by colonial officials, as part of the Montagu–Chelmsford Reforms in British India.
- An interallied conference began in Paris (with the Prime Ministers of the UK, France and Italy) to address German war reparations. The British government submitted a plan with easier payments for Germany in the early years to help avoid another default until the country got back on its feet. The nations agreed to reduce Germany's reparations debt to 50 billion gold marks, equivalent to $12.5 billion U.S. dollars.
- The first legally-opened birth control clinic in the United States, the Clinical Research Bureau, began services in New York City as the second clinic of Margaret Sanger and the American Birth Control League.
- Pierce Butler was sworn in as the newest Associate Justice of the U.S. Supreme Court after having been confirmed on December 21 by the U.S. Senate.
- BKD, LLP, one of the largest accounting firms in the U.S., was founded by William Baird, Wade Kurtz and Claire Dobson with an initial investment of $1,700.
- Born: Chalmers Goodlin, Royal Canadian Air Force and U.S. Navy test pilot who was the first to fly the Bell X-1 rocket plane; in Greensburg, Pennsylvania (d. 2005)
- Died: Harrison Hunter, 53, Scottish-American actor, died from complications after minor surgery (b. 1870)

== January 3, 1923 (Wednesday) ==
- At least 17 people were killed in the collapse of a bridge over the Cowlitz River in the U.S. state of Washington. At least 20 vehicles and more than 100 pedestrians, most of them employees of mills in Longview were crossing the bridge to return to their homes on the other side of the river in Kelso when two towers collapsed and a 300-foot long span fell into the river.
- The private secretary for King George V issued a denial of reports (made the day before by The Daily News of London) that Edward, Prince of Wales was arranging to marry Princess Yolanda of Savoy.
- Born:
  - K.S. "Bud" Adams, American businessman who founded and owned the Houston Oilers American football team; as Kenneth Stanley Adams Jr., in Bartlesville, Oklahoma (d. 2013)
  - Hank Stram, American professional football coach for the Dallas Texans and Kansas City Chiefs; as Henry Stram, in Chicago (d. 2005)
  - Stephen Yang Xiangtai, Chinese Roman Catholic bishop who survived the Cultural Revolution; in Gaocun, Hunan province, Republic of China (d. 2021)
- Died:
  - Jaroslav Hašek, 39, Czech writer noted for his series of books about The Good Soldier Švejk, died of a heart attack (b. 1883)
  - Cora L. V. Scott, 82, American spiritualist medium (b. 1840)

== January 4, 1923 (Thursday) ==
- The first radio network in the U.S. was created when the AT&T company used special telephone lines to broadcast programming simultaneously on New York City's WEAF and Boston's WNAC stations.
- The day after its Tuesday report of plans by the Prince of Wales to marry Princess Yolanda of Savoy, London's Daily News published a new report that "The formal announcement of the engagement of the Prince of Wales to a young Scottish lady of noble birth will be made within the next two or three months," without directly identifying the woman but implying through other items in its report that the Prince's future fiancée would be Elizabeth Bowes-Lyon. Lady Bowes-Lyon had previously been proposed to by the brother of the Prince of Wales, the Duke of York.
- The reparations conference in Paris broke up without success.
- Born: Tito Rodríguez, singer and bandleader; as Pablo Rodríguez Lozada, in Santurce, Puerto Rico (d. 1973)

== January 5, 1923 (Friday) ==
- Alois Rašín, the Finance Minister of Czechoslovakia, was shot and mortally wounded while walking out of his apartment in Prague and preparing to get into a car to travel to work. Struck in the back and in the side by gunshots fired by an anarchist, Josef Šoupal, Rašín would linger in pain for more than six weeks before dying on February 18.
- French airplanes were reported over unoccupied parts of Germany as rumors circulated that France was preparing to move troops into the Ruhr region.
- Twelve people were killed and 40 injured in Sofia, the capital of Bulgaria, after the explosion of a set of artillery shells left over from World War One and being handled by a local junk dealer. The dealer had purchased the shells from the Interallied Disarmament Commission, which decided to liquidate Bulgaria's stockpile of arms by selling the shells rather than disposing them.
- The football club C.D. Oro, based in Guadalajara, Mexico, was founded.
- Born:
  - Sam Phillips, American business executive and record producer; in Florence, Alabama (d. 2003)
  - Boris Leskin, Soviet and American stage and film actor; in Petrograd, Soviet Union (present-day Saint Petersburg, Russia) (d. 2020)

== January 6, 1923 (Saturday) ==
- The government of the Soviet Union endorsed a campaign by Komsomol, the Young Communists League, against the celebration of the Christmas holiday, which had been celebrated by Russian Christians since the start of the 20th century on January 7 (December 25 on the Julian calendar). Although the Gregorian calendar, used in most of the rest of the world, had been adopted by the Communist government of Russia in 1918, the Russian Christmas remained in accordance with the traditional calendar. Newspapers ran satires and criticism and anti-religious demonstrations were held indoors on Saturday, pamphlets were distributed and parades were held on Sunday. The government had issued cautions to Komsomol chapters to avoid violence, and prohibited any demonstrations after nightfall.
- The U.S. Senate voted, 57 to 6, to recall the remaining American troops in Germany rather than to participate further in the occupation of the Rhineland. President Harding gave the order of withdrawal on January 10 for the 1,200 soldiers remaining.
- Born: Jacobo Timerman, Soviet-born Argentine writer; in Bar, Ukrainian SSR, Soviet Union (present-day Ukraine) (d. 1999)

== January 7, 1923 (Sunday) ==
- The Rosewood Massacre ended when Rosewood, Florida ceased to exist, with all but two buildings razed to the ground.
- Born:
  - Hugh Kenner, Canadian literary scholar and critic; in Peterborough, Ontario (d. 2003)
  - Gertrude Ehrlich, Austrian-born American mathematician; in Vienna (d. 2025)
- Died: Emil G. Hirsch, 71, Luxembourgish-born Jewish American rabbi (b. 1851)

== January 8, 1923 (Monday) ==
- The United Kingdom and the United States opened a conference in Washington, D.C. to discuss British war debts to the U.S.
- Born:
  - Larry Storch, American comedian and actor; as Lawrence Storch, in New York City (d. 2022)
  - Johnny Wardle, English cricketer; as John Wardle, in Ardsley, South Yorkshire (d. 1985)

== January 9, 1923 (Tuesday) ==
- After an 8-month trial of 217 defendants at Gorakhpur Sessions Court for the February 5, 1922, burning of a police station and the deaths of 22 policemen, verdicts were returned. While 47 people were acquitted of all charges, 170 others were found guilty of various crimes. Of the 170, 19 were ultimately sentenced to be hanged while 14 were sentenced to life imprisonment.
- The Allied Reparation Commission approved a resolution declaring Germany to be in willful default of her coal deliveries under the terms of the Treaty of Versailles. The commissioners of France and Belgium voted to occupy Germany's industrial Ruhr Area (located in what is now the German state of North Rhine-Westphalia) to enforce Germany's reparation commitments, while the United Kingdom opposed the move.
- The U.S. federal board for vocational education released its findings that 1.7 million boys and girls dropped out of school between fourth and eighth grade each year, usually drifting into low-paying jobs.
- Died:
  - Edith Thompson, 29, and Frederick Bywaters, 20, convicted murderers for the October 9 murder of Edith's husband, Percy Thompson; were hanged at 9:00 in the morning in different prisons (Thompson b. 1893, Bywaters b. 1902). Edith's hanging took place at the Holloway Prison while Frederick was dropped from the gallows at Pentonville Prison half a mile away.
  - Katherine Mansfield, 34, New Zealand-born short fiction writer, died of pulmonary tuberculosis (b. 1888)
  - Satyendranath Tagore, 80, Indian composer and author (b. 1842)
  - Gustave Kahnt, 74, Luxembourgish composer (b. 1848)

== January 10, 1923 (Wednesday) ==
- At the Near East Conference in Lausanne in Switzerland, the representatives of the nations present voted to accept a proposal made by Turkey "to exchange the Greek population of Turkey against the Turkish population of Greece", a move that would forcibly resettle 600,000 Greeks in Turkey and 450,000 Turks in Greece. Exemptions were made for 200,000 Greeks in Constantinople (Istanbul) and 300,000 Turks in Western Thrace.
- Troops from Lithuania, "profiting by the international situation", invaded the Memel Territory, established as a League of Nations mandate between Lithuania and former German territory, supporting an uprising by Lithuanian residents of the League territory, the Klaipėda Revolt.
- Because of the discovery of oil reserves in the Sultanate of Oman, at the time a British protectorate, Sultan Said bin Taimur was compelled to sign an agreement with Britain to provide for pre-approval by the British High Commissioner in India of any contracts between oil exploration companies and Oman for exploration and drilling rights to Oman's oil fields.
- The Universidad Autónoma de San Luis Potosí (UASLP) was established as the first self-governing public university in Mexico, after the legislature of the State of San Luis Potosí authorized Governor Rafael Nieto to issue Decree 106.
- The unification of the currencies of the three constituent republics of the Transcaucasian Socialist Soviet Republic began with a two-month period for Armenian, Azeri and Georgian roubles to be exchanged for the new Transcaucasian rouble. The deadline was later extended to April 10, 1924, in order to have the old currency replaced by the Soviet rouble.
- A buildup of French forces was reported around Essen.
- Born: Dick Johnson, Canadian-born American glider pilot and winner of 11 U.S. national championships; as Richard H. Johnson, in Medicine Hat, Alberta (d. 2008)

== January 11, 1923 (Thursday) ==
- French and Belgian troops began the occupation of the Ruhr in response to Germany's default on its reparations payments. The first French Army troops crossed into Essen at 4:45 in the morning and encountered no resistance from the local population. By a vote of 478 to 86, the Assemblée nationale endorsed the actions of Prime Minister Prime Minister Raymond Poincaré Within days, the French forces had taken control of all major mining and industrial towns in the area around Essen, ranging from Wesel, Dorsten and Hamm on the Lippe to the cities that now comprise Wuppertal on the Wupper, as well as Essen, Dortmund and Bochum. By the end of the week, 100,000 French troops under the command of General Jean Degoutte were in place in the Ruhr area.
- Owners of the clothing manufacturers of the United States, in a meeting of the Associated Dress Industries of America, voted to jointly hire "a supreme arbiter of the industry with broad executive powers" comparable to the commissioner of baseball, and selected executive director David N. Mosessohn to be the czar of dressmaking, at the time one of the top five industries in the United States based on the output of one billion dollars a year in products.
- Adolf Hitler addressed several mass meetings in Munich. "Our protest against France must turn to a frantic determination to square matters with the scoundrels in our own country who are responsible for the whole misery", he stated. "We must not say down with France, but down with our own traitors and criminals."
- Born: Ernst Nolte, German historian and philosopher; in Witten (d. 2016)
- Died:
  - Constantine I of Greece, 54, King of Greece (b. 1868)
  - George Hamlin, 53, American opera tenor (b. 1869)
  - William H. Moore, 74, American financier, corporate attorney and entrepreneur who helped create multiple large American corporations, including Western Union, National Biscuit Company (Nabisco), Bankers Trust, Diamond Match Company, and the American Can Company (b. 1848)

== January 12, 1923 (Friday) ==
- The Grand Council of Fascism was established in Italy.
- The British press heavily criticized the French for their actions in the Ruhr. The Outlook wrote that Raymond Poincaré would be immortalized as "one of the most colossal of idiots, or alternatively the greatest of knaves", while The Spectator said that France was "going to commit the extremity of human folly." The Economist warned that France's actions might lead to another European war.
- A spokesperson for the White House said the administration would make no formal reply to the German government's protest against the occupation of the Ruhr, explaining that the Americans had already done everything they could do unless they were looking for "more trouble" than they were prepared to undertake.
- Born:
  - Ira Hayes, U.S. Marine and flag raiser on Iwo Jima; in Sacaton, Arizona (d. 1955)
  - Alice Miller, Polish-Swiss psychologist and philosopher; as Alicja Englard, in Piotrków Trybunalski (d. 2010)

== January 13, 1923 (Saturday) ==
- The Reichstag voted 283 to 12 to approve a passive resistance movement in protest against the occupation of the Ruhr. The vote was preceded by a fiery speech from Chancellor Wilhelm Cuno, who said the occupation was in breach of the Treaty of Versailles.
- Four passengers, two of them young children, were killed in the crash of an Aeromarine West Indies Airways flight between Key West and Havana, when the Aeromarine 75 flying boat, dubbed the "Columbus", suffered engine trouble and ditched at sea in the Florida Strait during a storm. Waves as high as 20 feet (6.1 m) capsized the plane and filled the cabin, drowning the children and knocking their father and their governess overboard. The pilot, the co-pilot, and the other two passengers were able to stay afloat until their rescue by a passing ferry ship, the H.M. Flagler, and the airplane sank shortly afterward. The accident was the deadliest U.S. airliner crash of the year 1923.
- Days after she had been erroneously listed as the future fiancée of the Edward, Prince of Wales, Lady Elizabeth Bowes-Lyon accepted the third proposal of marriage from the prince's brother, Prince Albert, Duke of York. Lady Bowes-Lyon had declined proposals by Prince Albert in 1921 and 1922 because she did not wish to become subject to the narrow restrictions of members of royalty.
- Born: Harry Hon Hai Wong, Hong Kong food manufacturer and entrepreneur known as "The Noodle King" for perfecting the process of packaging "instant ramen" and promoting its worldwide distribution; in Kulangsu, Fujian province, Republic of China (d. 2019)
- Died:
  - Alexandre Ribot, 80, French politician, served as the Prime Minister of France on four occasions between 1892 and 1917 (b. 1842)
  - Nestor Montoya, 60, U.S. representative at large for New Mexico and former speaker of the New Mexico House of Representatives; died of a stroke at his home in Washington while preparing to go to work (b. 1862)

== January 14, 1923 (Sunday) ==
- For the first time, wireless transmission of distinctive voices across the Atlantic Ocean was demonstrated, opening the potential of regular telephone service between the United States and the United Kingdom. "Scattering words and phrases have been wirelessly telephoned across the ocean before," The New York Times noted the next day, "but thousands of words were shot over the distance of 3,400 miles last night and heard apparently with the distinctness of messages over a wire from Times Square to Herald Square." The first phone call was made at 9:00 p.m. local time from New York (2:00 a.m. GMT) by H. B. Thayer, president of American Telephone and Telegraph (AT&T), which had developed the technology, while Guglielmo Marconi and others listened at their receiving station at London in Southgate. Because there was no comparable telephone transmitter in London or a receiver in New York the acknowledgement of the messages was cabled from London, with the first reply received in New York 11 minutes later.
- Alfonso Quiñónez Molina was approved by 178,000 voters to a four-year term as President of El Salvador, after challenger Miguel Tomás Molina called on his supporters to boycott the election. Quiñónez was the brother-in-law of his two predecessors, Jorge Meléndez and Carlos Meléndez, and was the third member of the "Meléndez—Quiñónez dynasty" that ruled El Salvador from 1915 to 1927.
- The Soviet Union made its first public statement about the Ruhr occupation, expressing "a voice of indignation and protest against the measures of the French government" and warning that "imperialistic France's attempt to go even beyond the shameful Versailles treaty" could lead to war.
- Died: George H. Tichenor, 86, American physician (b. 1837)

== January 15, 1923 (Monday) ==
- The patent for the manufacturing process for insulin was assigned by co-discoverers Frederick Banting, Charles H. Best, James Collip, J. J. R. Macleod and John G. FitzGerald to the University of Toronto in order to make the production of the diabetes-fighting medicine affordable to the general public.
- French troops fired on a crowd of German protesters in Bochum, killing one of them and seriously wounding two others. The French government warned that it would occupy more cities in the Ruhr if the Germans continued their refusal to cooperate with the operation of the coal mines in occupied regions.
- Lithuanian troops captured Memel and forced the surrender of a League of Nations peacekeeping force that had been sent to stop the invasion.
- The wedding date of Lady Elizabeth Bowes-Lyon and Prince Albert, Duke of York was announced as April 26.
- Born:
  - Rukmani Devi, Sri Lankan singer and film actress, known as "The Nightingale of Sri Lanka"; as Daisy Rasammah Daniels, in Nuwara Eliya, Ceylon (present-day Sri Lanka) (d. 1978)
  - Wang Shouguan, Chinese astrophysicist; in Fuzhou, Fujian province, Republic of China (d. 2021)
- Died: Zübeyde Hanım, 65–66, mother of Turkish leader Mustafa Kemal Atatürk (b. 1857)

== January 16, 1923 (Tuesday) ==
- Industrialist Harry Ford Sinclair spent three hours testifying before a committee investigating the Teapot Dome oil lease.
- The Klaipėda Revolt came to a successful end for the Lithuanian rebels as the League signed a truce with Lithuania, providing for the transfer of the Memel territory for administration by the Republic of Lithuania, effective February 17.
- Born:
  - Anthony Hecht, American poet; in New York City (d. 2004)
  - Walther Wever, German Luftwaffe ace fighter pilot; in Munich (d. 1945)
  - Dick Sipek, deaf American major league baseball player who played outfield for the Cincinnati Reds in 1945; in Chicago (d. 2005)

== January 17, 1923 (Wednesday) ==
- The first practical helicopter, the Cierva C.4 autogyro, made its first successful flight. Invented by Spanish engineer Juan de la Cierva and piloted by Lieutenant Alejandro Gomez Spencer of the Spanish Flying Corps, the autogyro was documented to have flown, 600 feet at a steady altitude of 13 feet in a demonstration at Getafe Air Base outside Madrid.
- Born: David S. Nivison, American historian specializing in ancient Chinese history; in Farmingdale, Maine (d. 2014)

== January 18, 1923 (Thursday) ==
- France's Rhineland High Commission issued an order authorizing the French Army troops in the Ruhr to seize customs receipts and collected taxes on mined coal, and to take over the forests in the occupied area in order to compensate for unpaid reparations. Germany's Reichsbank reacted by closing its branches in the occupied territory and moving the assets into the unoccupied area. The first direct action taken by the French was to seize seven barges and 120 coal trucks and their cargoes. French and Belgian authorities also issued a proclamation banning the singing of German patriotic songs (specifically "Deutschland Uber Alles" and "Die Wacht Am Rhein"), displaying "any kind of a flag, whether the national colors or otherwise", or "any kind of buttonhole insignia." Violations were punishable by a fine of 200,000 marks (about nine dollars or less at the time) or six months imprisonment.
- Fist fights broke out in France's Chamber of Deputies in "what is said to have been the wildest rioting in the history of the French Parliament," with about 50 of the more than 500 members brawling. The occasion was a debate over whether to suspend the parliamentary immunity of one of the deputies, French Communist Party leader Marcel Cachin, in order to allow his arrest for treason. At the end of the session, the Deputies voted 371 to 143 to allow Cachin to be prosecuted.
- The German mark dropped to 23,800 against the U.S. dollar. On January 1, one U.S. dollar had been worth 9,000 marks.
- Died:
  - Tennessee Claflin, 78, American suffragist and business executive who was the first woman to open a Wall Street brokerage firm along with her sister Victoria Woodhull (b. 1844)
  - Wallace Reid, 31, American film actor, died from complications of a morphine addiction (b. 1891)
  - William C. Foster, 42, American cinematographer, died from complications of syphilis (b. 1880)
  - Kate Santley, 85, German-born British stage actress (b. 1837)

== January 19, 1923 (Friday) ==
Hafnium

- The discovery of hafnium, element 72, was announced from the Niels Bohr Institute of the University of Copenhagen in Denmark by physicist Dirk Coster of the Netherlands and chemist George de Hevesy of Hungary, who announced their finding in the journal Nature. The existence of a 72nd natural element had been predicted in 1869 by Dmitri Mendeleev. The name "Hafnium" was derived from the Latin name for Copenhagen.
- China's President Sun Yat-sen signed an agreement transferring his executive powers to a five-member military junta.
- Germany ordered all government employees to refuse to obey the French occupational forces.
- German miners in Buer went on strike after French occupation forces arrested seven mine officials for failing to cooperate. All banking institutions in Düsseldorf closed, bringing commerce in the city to a halt
- Born:
  - Jean Stapleton, American actress, known for her role on the TV show All in the Family; as Jeanne Murray, in Manhattan, New York City (d. 2013)
  - Eugénio de Andrade, Portuguese poet; as José Fontinhas, in Fundão (d. 2005)

== January 20, 1923 (Saturday) ==
- French occupational authorities in the Ruhr arrested 21 German mine operators and officials as all banks in Essen voluntarily closed.
- Born: Slim Whitman, American folk singer known for his use of yodeling, falsetto vocals and guitar abilities; as Ottis Dewey Whitman, in Tampa, Florida (d. 2013)

== January 21, 1923 (Sunday) ==
- A general strike of miners, railway, postal and telegraph workers, endorsed by the German government, was called in the Ruhr by the leaders of trade unions in resistance to the French and Belgian occupation.
- A royal decree in Italy allowed for the minting of new coins with the king's face on one side and the fasces on the other.

== January 22, 1923 (Monday) ==
- The general strike in the Ruhr failed to materialize as only about 10,000 of the 600,000 workers in the Ruhr area refused to work.
- A 7.2 magnitude earthquake occurred off the shore of northern California, close to Cape Mendocino.
- The short comedy film The Balloonatic starring Buster Keaton was released.
- Mexican streetcar operators went on strike.
- Born: Diana Douglas, Bermudian-born American actress; as Diana Dill (d. 2015)

== January 23, 1923 (Tuesday) ==
- The French cabinet decided to take measures to isolate the Ruhr from the rest of Germany.
- Born: Cot Deal, American professional baseball player and coach; as Ellis Deal, in Arapaho, Oklahoma (d. 2013)
- Died: Max Nordau, 73, Hungarian author, philosopher and Zionist leader (b. 1849)

== January 24, 1923 (Wednesday) ==
- The U.S. Army withdrew the last of its occupational forces from Germany, departing from Coblenz and ending the stationing of troops there after more than four years. At noon, the American flag was lowered from the Ehrenbreitstein Fortress and the remaining troops of the U.S. Army's 8th Infantry Regiment boarded trains at the Coblenz station at 4:00. The band of the 156th French Infantry played the "Star-Spangled Banner" and "La Marseillaise" as the trains pulled out to leave Germany and travel to Belgium and the port of Antwerp.
- At least 15 persons were killed in the sudden collapse of the seven-story Mosse Haus building in Berlin, headquarters of the Rudolph Mosse publishing company, printer of the Berliner Tageblatt daily newspaper. The structure had been weakened from damage in the Spartacist uprising of 1919 and the subsequent addition of three more floors. The roof, overloaded during additional construction, collapsed onto the top floor, which then fell from the impact and caused the successive collapse of the floors beneath, all within a space of 30 seconds.
- The French imposed a total of 207,000 francs worth of fines (equivalent at the time to $13,800) on Ruhr industrialists for failing to deliver reparations of coal. Rioting broke out in Mainz when the verdict was announced and a call for a general strike was renewed. 35,000 railway workers began striking at 8:00 p.m.
- Born: Hansa Wadkar, Indian film actress; as Ratan Bhalachander Salgaokar, in Bombay (present-day Mumbai), British India (d. 1971)

== January 25, 1923 (Thursday) ==
- The Saeima, the unicameral parliament of Latvia, voted 65 to 16 in favor of Janis Pauluks as the new Prime Minister of Latvia, succeeding Zigfrids Meierovics.
- The Japanese weekly pictorial news magazine Asahigraph began publication. It would continue publication until October 13, 2000.
- The last U.S. Army occupation troops in Europe departed, as the U.S. Navy transport ship St. Mihiel left from the Belgian port of Antwerp with a simple farewell ceremony.
- French troops battled angry mobs in several cities in the Ruhr as the region's entire railway system was paralysed on the first full day of the strike.
- An explosion and fire on the oil tanker San Leandro, owned by the El Águila, the Mexican Eagle Petroleum Company caused the loss of 10 of the 46 crew, and serious injuries to 19 others, after an accident on the Pánuco River at Tampico.
- Born:
  - Arvid Carlsson, Swedish scientist and recipient of the Nobel Prize in Physiology or Medicine; in Uppsala(d. 2018)
  - Shōtarō Ikenami, Japanese historical novelist; in Tokyo) (d. 1990)

== January 26, 1923 (Friday) ==
- The Sun–Joffe Manifesto, the first cooperative agreement between China and the Soviet Union, was signed in Beijing by Sun Yat-sen, Premier of the Republic of China, and Adolph Joffe, the Soviet Ambassador to China.
- General Jean Degoutte issued a proclamation warning Germans against causing any further trouble or else the French troops would fire without warning.
- Born:
  - Alfred Nisonoff, American immunologist and chemist; in Queens, New York City (d. 2001)
  - Anne Jeffreys, American actress known for Topper, General Hospital and Love That Jill; as Annie Jeffreys Carmichael, in Goldsboro, North Carolina (d. 2017)
  - Sid Wayne, American songwriter and lyricist known for the songs "It's Impossible" and "I Need Your Love Tonight"; as Sidney Weinberg, in Brooklyn, New York City (d. 1991)

== January 27, 1923 (Saturday) ==
- The National Socialist Party of Germany, led by Adolf Hitler and commonly called the Nazi Party, held its first party congress, at a gathering in Munich attended by 6,000 party members.
- The parliament of the small republic of San Marino, the Consiglio Grande e Generale, was forcibly dissolved by Sammarinese Fascist Party members led by Giuliano Gozi and allied with Italian dictator Benito Mussolini. The legislators, including the two Captains Regent, Onofrio Fattori and Giuseppe Balducci, were forced to step down until a new Fascist government could be installed.
- After payment of a ransom of four million pesetas by the Spanish government, the Republic of the Rif, an unrecognized nation of the Rifian Berbers in Spanish Morocco and led by Abd el-Krim, released the surviving 326 prisoners of war who had been taken captive after the Spanish surrender at the Battle of Annual on July 22, 1921. During the 18 months of captivity, 261 of the original 587 prisoners of war had died.
- French soldiers in Duisburg and Ratingen were shot at by snipers while the railway strike expanded to Koblenz.
- Argentine Army Colonel Héctor Benigno Varela, who had carried out the massacre of 1,500 peasants who had participated in the Patagonia Rebelde uprising between 1920 and 1922, was assassinated by German-born anarchist Kurt Gustav Wilckens.
- Born: Jean Merrill, American children's author known for The Pushcart War; in Rochester, New York (d. 2012)
- Died: Sherman E. Burroughs, 52, American politician, served as U.S. Representative for New Hampshire from 1917 to his death, died suddenly at his home from influenza (b. 1870)

== January 28, 1923 (Sunday) ==
- A group of 100,000 French-speaking Belgians protested against the use of the Flemish language at Ghent University. The demonstration in Brussels, with crowds chanting "Gand est français!" ("Ghent is French!"), came in the wake of a bill passed by the Chamber of Deputies and sent to the Senate, requiring classes to be taught in Flemish and abolishing the traditional teaching of classes in French.
- The World Figure Skating Championships ended in Vienna. Fritz Kachler of Austria won the men's competition, and Herma Szabo of Austria won the ladies' competition.
- Born:
  - Dr. Robert W. Rand, American neurosurgeon and inventor known for his application of the surgical microscope into neurosurgical procedures; in Los Angeles (d. 2013)
  - Cosma Spessotto, Italian-born Salvadoran priest beatified by the Roman Catholic Church; as Sante Spessotto, in Mansuè (d. assassinated 1980 )
- Died: Alfred Holdship, 55, New Zealand cricketer (b. 1867)

== January 29, 1923 (Monday) ==
- Edward Terry Sanford was confirmed as Associate Justice of the U.S. Supreme Court by a voice vote in the U.S. Senate, and would take his seat on the court on February 19.
- Mustafa Kemal Pasha, the Speaker of the Turkish Grand National Assembly married Latife Uşaki. During her brief time as the wife of Turkey's leader, she would take an active role in the emancipation of women in the Islamic republic.
- The Colorado Rangers who had patrolled the U.S. state of Colorado since 1861, were ordered to be disbanded, with effect from February 1, by executive order of Governor William E. Sweet in order to thwart prohibition enforcement as well as reduce law enforcement capacity in labor disputes that were common in mines.
- Born:
  - Paddy Chayefsky, American playwright, screenwriter and novelist, winner of three Academy Awards for best screenplay (for Marty (1955), The Hospital (1971) and Network (1976); as Sidney Aaron Chayefsky, in the Bronx, New York (d. 1981)
  - Martin Ragaway, American screenwriter; in Brooklyn, New York (d. 1989)

== January 30, 1923 (Tuesday) ==
- The Convention Concerning the Exchange of Greek and Turkish Populations was signed in Lausanne, Switzerland, by the governments of Greece and Turkey in the aftermath of Turkey's victory in the Greco-Turkish War, and would forcibly relocate more than 1.6 million people based on ethnicity and religion. Officially, the agreement led to 1,221,489 Turkish-born Greek Orthodox Christians being removed from formerly Greek-portions of western Turkey, and as many as 400,000 Greek-born Muslims, beginning on May 1. Under the terms of the treaty, Greek residents of Istanbul (formerly Constantinople) and Muslim Turks on the Greek side of the divided area of Thrace, were exempt.
- Living in exile in the Netherlands, the former heir to the throne of Germany, Wilhelm of Hohenzollern, drove from his home in Doorn to the town of Nijmegen, near German border. Staying on the Dutch side, Prince Wilhelm then drove along the frontier through villages on the road to Roermond, stopping to talk to monarchist Germans and admirers to discuss his possible return to become Kaiser Wilhelm III. After spending the night at the Hillenraad Castle as the guest of Count Herman Jozef Wolff-Metternich, before he "probably decided that the time was not yet ripe" to return to Germany, and drove back to Doorn the next day.
- The value of the German papiermark fell to less than 1/40,000th of a U.S. dollar for the first time on currency exchanges, making the currency worth only one 10,000th of its pre-World War One value of 25 American cents.
- The German railway strike spread to Mainz.
- Born:
  - Leonid Gaidai, Soviet Russian film director and screenwriter known for his popular film comedies, including The Diamond Arm, Operation Y and Ivan Vasilievich Changes Profession; in Svobodny, Amur Oblast, Russian SFSR, Soviet Union (d. 1993)
  - Walt "Moose" Dropo, American baseball first baseman, 1950 American League Rookie of the Year and RBI leader; in Moosup, Connecticut (d. 2010)

== January 31, 1923 (Wednesday) ==
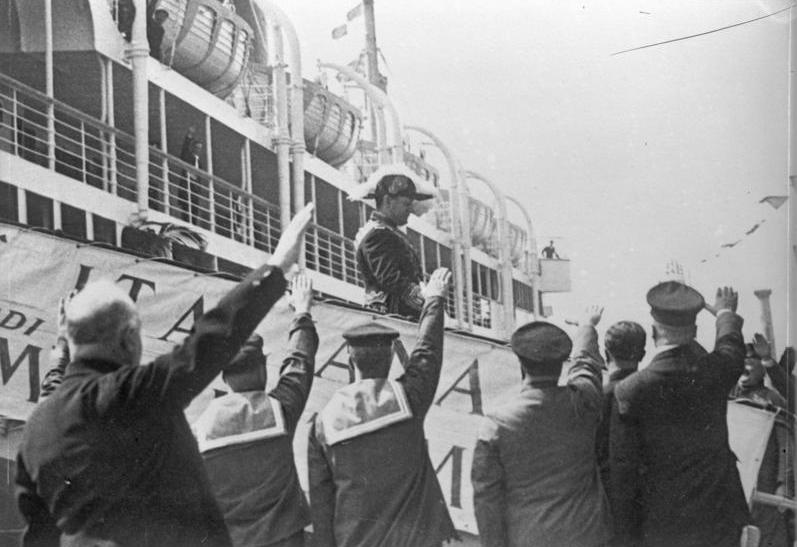
Italy's Benito Mussolini receiving the Fascist Salute

- Italy's Ministry of Public Instruction issued a new regulation requiring public school students to honor the Italian flag with the "Fascist salute", a gesture of extending the right arm toward the flag, palm down and fingers together, and said to be derived from the traditional salute given in the Roman Empire. The salute would later be adopted in Germany by the Nazi Party.
- A mine explosion and toxic gas killed 145 coal miners at the German-owned Heinitz Coal Company operating in Rozbark, near Bytom.
- Germany and Soviet Russia ratified the Treaty of Rapallo, soon to be extended to the other member republics of the Soviet Union. The two nations renounced territorial and financial claims against each other. The Communist government of Russia had negotiated a separate peace treaty with Germany to formally end World War I.
- France ordered a coal blockade of Germany.
- For the first time in the history of the National Hockey League, a game was completed with neither side having been penalized. The Montreal Canadiens defeated the Hamilton Tigers, 5 to 4.
- Born: Norman Mailer, Pulitzer Prize-winning American author with 11 bestsellers, as well as a journalist who co-founded The Village Voice; as Nachem Malech Mailer, in Long Branch, New Jersey (d. 2007)
- Died:
  - Eligiusz Niewiadomski, 53, Polish painter, was executed by firing squad after being convicted for the December 16 assassination of Polish President Gabriel Narutowicz (b. 1869)
  - Dr. Carlos Montezuma (Wassaja), 56–57, Yavapai American physician and activist for indigenous American rights, co-founder of the Society of American Indians (b. c. 1866)
  - Henry Clews, 88, English-born American financier on Wall Street (b. 1834)
