= Ruble =

Unit of currency

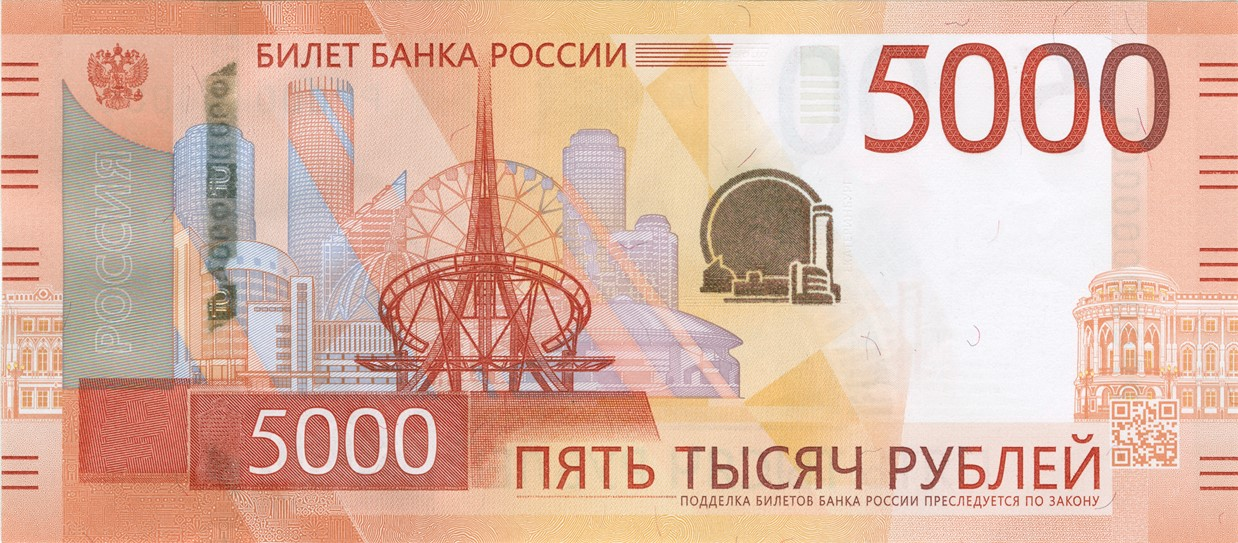
5,000 Russian rubles of the 2023 series, the highest available nominal in circulation

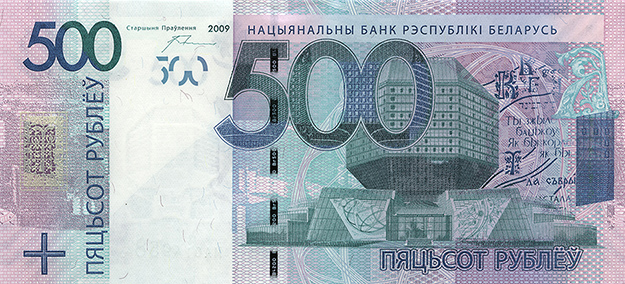
500 Belarusian rubles of the 2009 series, the highest available nominal in circulation, though it is rarely seen

The ruble or rouble (/ˈruːbəl/; Russian: рубль, IPA: [rublʲ]) is a currency unit. Currently, currencies named ruble in circulation include the Russian ruble (RUB, ₽) in Russia and the Belarusian ruble (BYN,) in Belarus. These currencies are subdivided into one hundred kopeks. The kopek is no longer formally subdivided, although denga (½ kopek) and polushka (½ denga, thus ¼ kopek) were minted until the 19th century in Russia. Additionally, the Transnistrian ruble is used in Transnistria, an unrecognized breakaway province of Moldova.

Historically, the grivna, ruble and denga were used in Russia as measurements of weight. In 1704, as a result of monetary reforms by Peter the Great, the imperial ruble of the Russian Empire became the first decimal currency. The silver ruble was used until 1897 and the gold ruble was used until 1917. The Soviet ruble officially replaced the imperial ruble in 1922 and continued to be used until 1993, when it was formally replaced with the Russian ruble in the Russian Federation and by other currencies in other post-Soviet states. In the past, several other countries influenced by the Russian Empire and the Soviet Union had currency units that were also named ruble, including the Latvian ruble, Tajikistani ruble and Transcaucasian ruble (later Armenian ruble, Azerbaijani ruble, Georgian ruble).

== Countries and territories currently using currency units named "ruble" ==
Currency	Current users	ISO 4217 code
Russian ruble	Russian Federation (1992–present); Abkhazia (2008–present); South Ossetia (2008–present)	RUB (1998–present); RUR (1992–1997)
Belarusian ruble	Belarus (1994–present)	BYN (2016–present); BYR (2000–2016); BYB (1994–2000)
Transnistrian ruble	Transnistria (1994–present)	-

== Countries and territories historically using currency units named "ruble" ==
Currency	Historical users	ISO 4217 code	Replaced	Replaced by
Russian ruble	Principality of Moscow (c. 1300–1547); Tsardom of Russia (1547–1721); Russian Empire (1721–1917); Russian SFSR (1917–1922); Kyrgyzstan (1992–1993); Moldova (1992–1993); Turkmenistan (1992–1993); Armenia (1992–1994); Azerbaijan (1992–1994); Belarus (1992–1994); Georgia (1992–1994); Kazakhstan (1992–1994); Uzbekistan (1992–1994); Tajikistan (1992–1995)	RUR	Grivna, Denga, Soviet ruble	Soviet ruble (1922–1992)
Transcaucasian ruble (Armenian ruble, Azerbaijani ruble, Georgian ruble)	Transcaucasian DFR (1918); First Republic of Armenia (1918–1920); Azerbaijan Democratic Republic (1918–1920); Democratic Republic of Georgia (1918–1921); Transcaucasian SFSR (1922–1924)	-	Russian ruble	Soviet ruble
Soviet ruble	Soviet Union (1922–1992)	SUR	Russian ruble	Russian ruble, Estonian kroon, Latvian ruble, Lithuanian talonas, Ukrainian karbovanets
Latvian ruble	Latvia (1992–1993)	LVR	Soviet ruble	Latvian lats
Tajikistani ruble	Tajikistan (1995–2000)	TJR	Russian ruble	Tajikistani somoni

== See also ==
- List of circulating currencies
- Currency union
