= February 1923 =

Month of 1923

<<	February 1923					>>
Su	Mo	Tu	We	Th	Fr	Sa
				1	2	3
4	5	6	7	8	9	10
11	12	13	14	15	16	17
18	19	20	21	22	23	24
25	26	27	28

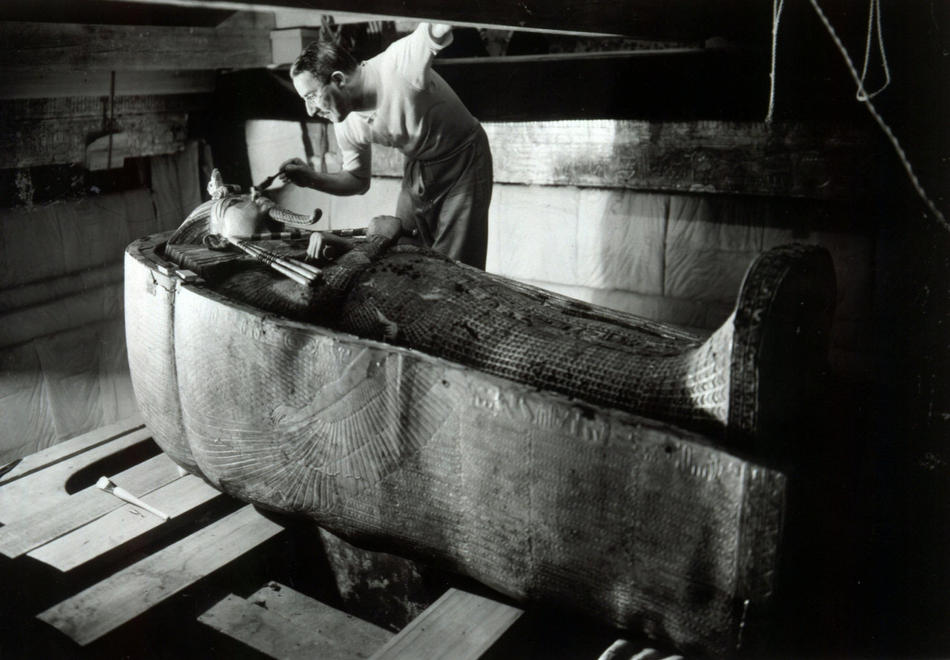
February 16, 1923: Archaeologist Howard Carter enters the tomb of Egypt's King Tutanakhamun

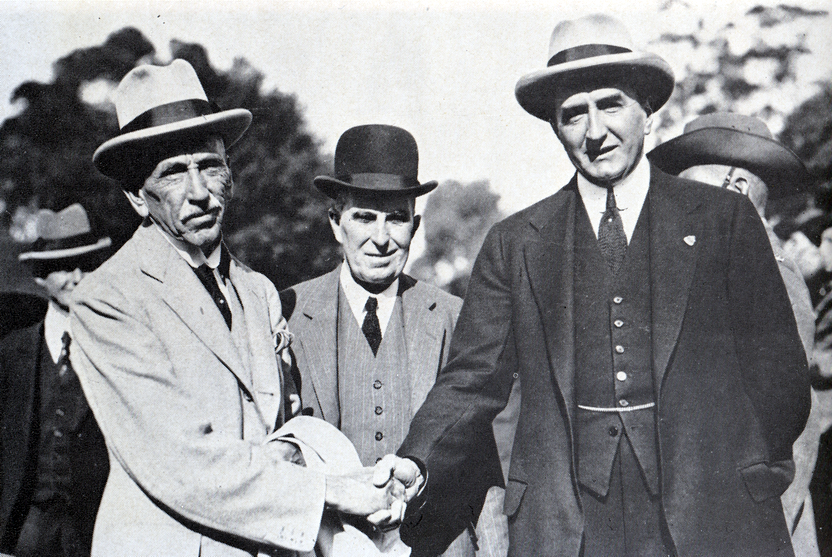
February 9, 1923: Australia's Prime Minister Billy Hughes (left) resigns and his succeeded by Stanley Bruce (on right, shaking hands with Hughes)

The following events occurred in February 1923:

== February 1, 1923 (Thursday) ==
- The first nationwide "football pool" in the United Kingdom, a legal betting pool for gamblers betting money on the outcome of soccer football matches, was launched as bookmakers John Moores, Colin Askham and Bill Hughes created the Littlewood Football Pool in Liverpool. Only 35 out of 4,000 printed betting coupons were sold for the first trial of the wagering service.
- The Milizia Volontaria per la Sicurezza Nazionale (MSVN), the Italian Fascist Party's "Blackshirts" paramilitary organization, began operations as a government-supported militia. Field Marshal Emilio De Bono, a retired Italian Army general and one of the Fascist Party organizers, became the Blackshirts' first commander.
- Mexican troops stormed the headquarters of streetcar operators that continued to hold out on strike after the majority of them had returned to work. A shootout ensued in which 14 of the strikers were reportedly killed.
- Inflation worsened in Germany as the mark dropped to 220,000 against a British pound.
- Died: Ernst Troeltsch, 57, German theologian (b. 1865)

== February 2, 1923 (Friday) ==
- Bulgarian Prime Minister Aleksandar Stamboliyski survived an assassination attempt carried out by the Internal Macedonian Revolutionary Organization. Stamboliyski would live for four more months before being overthrown on June 9 and then kidnapped, tortured and killed on June 14, 1923.
- Striking railway workers in the Ruhr began returning to their jobs as German resistance to the French occupation faltered due to the coal blockade.
- The German drama film Nora premiered in Berlin.
- Born:
  - Liz Smith, American gossip columnist; as Mary Elizabeth Smith, in Fort Worth, Texas (d. 2017)
  - Red Schoendienst, American professional baseball player, National Baseball Hall of Fame inductee; as Albert Fred Schoendienst, in Germantown, Illinois (d. 2018)
  - James Dickey, American poet and novelist who served as the United States Poet Laureate; in Atlanta (d. 1997)
- Died:
  - Manuel Murguia, 89, Spanish Galician journalist who founded the Real Academia Galega (b. 1833)
  - Robert Leonhardt, 50, Austrian-born American opera singer (b. 1872)

== February 3, 1923 (Saturday) ==
- A magnitude 8.3 to 8.5 earthquake struck the Kamchatka Peninsula in the Soviet Union, generating a twenty-five foot tsunami that raced across the Pacific Ocean. The quake caused a series of seven waves over the Hawaiian Islands territory, killing at least 12 people at Kahalui on the island of Maui.
- Sovnarkom, the ruling executive body of the Soviet Union, approved plans to create a civil aviation authority for passenger air travel, which would lead to the foundation of the Soviet national airline, Aeroflot.
- Born:
  - Edith Barney, American baseball player in the All-American Girls Professional Baseball League; in Bridgeport, Connecticut (d. 2010)
  - Barbara Hall, British crossword compiler and advice columnist for The Sunday Times; in Derby, Derbyshire (d. 2022)
- Died: Kuroki Tamemoto, 78, Japanese general (b. 1844)

== February 4, 1923 (Sunday) ==
- The Conference of Lausanne broke off in failure as Lord Curzon, the British Foreign Secretary was unable to get Turkey's İsmet İnönü to reach a compromise. Curzon left that night on the Orient Express.
- French troops expanded their occupation of Germany to include the key railway centers of Offenburg and Appenweier.
- Born: Conrad Bain, Canadian television actor and comedian known for his roles in the U.S. sitcoms Diff'rent Strokes and Maude; in Lethbridge, Alberta, Canada (d. 2013)
- Died:
  - Prince Fushimi Sadanaru, 64, Field Marshal of the Imperial Japanese Army who, as Lord Keeper of the Privy Seal from 1912 to 1915, served as the top adviser to the Emperor (b. 1858)
  - William H. Thompson, 70, Scottish-born American stage actor who left Broadway in order to join the vaudeville circuit (b. 1852)

== February 5, 1923 (Monday) ==
- Mohamed Tawfik Naseem announced his resignation as Prime Minister of Egypt, along with his cabinet. More than five weeks would pass before a new government could be formed by Education Minister Yahya Ibrahim Pasha.
- Australian cricketer Bill Ponsford made 429 runs to break the world record for the highest first-class cricket score for the first time in his third match at this level, at Melbourne Cricket Ground, giving the Victoria cricket team an innings total of 1,059.
- The Canadian province of Quebec held a provincial election. The Liberal Party led by Louis-Alexandre Taschereau retained its majority.
- Born:
  - Fatmawati, the First Lady of Indonesia from 1945 to 1967, the first woman to serve as President of Indonesia, and designed the red and white Flag of Indonesia; in Bengkulu, Dutch East Indies (d. 1980)
  - Jack Murphy, American sportswriter for the San Diego Union whose lobbying led to major league sports teams to bring franchises to the area; in Denver, Colorado (d. 1980)
- Died: Count Erich Kielmansegg, 75, Austrian statesman who served briefly as the Minister-President of Austria within the Austro-Hungarian Empire in 1895 (b. 1847)

== February 6, 1923 (Tuesday) ==
- The crown of Georgia's last monarch, Giorgi XII, confiscated by Tsar Alexander I of Russia in 1801 after the Kingdom of Georgia's annexation into the Russian Empire, was returned by the Soviet Government to the Georgian State Museum in Tbilisi. Officials of the Georgian SSR would take the crown from the museum on April 23, 1930, and has not been seen publicly since then.
- At the opening of an air conference in London, Director of Civil Aviation Sefton Brancker predicted that within five years, an airplane would be able to travel from London to New York in just twelve hours.
- Born:
  - Marshal Alexander Yefimov, Commander-in-Chief of the Soviet Air Force from 1984 to 1990; in Kantemirovka, Russian SFSR (present-day Russia) (d. 2012)
  - Ben Leito, Curaçaoan economist and politician, served as the Governor of the Netherlands Antilles from 1970 to 1983, later a member of the Netherlands Council of State; as Bernadito M. Leito, in Willemstad, Curaçao (d. 1996)
- Died: E. E. Barnard, 65, American astronomer, for whom Barnard's Star is named (b. 1857)

== February 7, 1923 (Wednesday) ==
- The General Treaty of Peace and Amity, 1923, was signed in Washington DC between representatives of the Central American nations of Costa Rica, El Salvador, Guatemala, Honduras, and Nicaragua. The five nations pledged that they would not give recognition to any government in the area that came to power in any manner other than a peaceful transfer of power. Only three nations (Costa Rica, Guatemala and Nicaragua) would ratify the treaty.
- The musical Wildflower, with book and lyrics by Otto Harbach and Oscar Hammerstein II and music by Herbert Stothart and Vincent Youmans, opened at the Casino Theatre on Broadway for the first of 477 performances.
- Born: George Lascelles, 7th Earl of Harewood, director of the Royal Opera House, chairman of the board of the English National Opera, managing director of the English National Opera North, president of the British Board of Film Classification, and member of the extended British Royal family; in London (d. 2011)
- Died: Kristine Marie Jensen, 65, Danish housekeeper and author of the popular cookbook Frøken Jensens Kogebog (b. 1858)

== February 8, 1923 (Thursday) ==
- An explosion killed 123 miners at the Stag Canon #1 mine in Dawson, New Mexico when a train jumped its track, slammed into the supporting timbers near the mine entrance, and touched off an explosion. Some of the victims were the sons of men who were killed in a 1913 mine disaster at the same site.
- A gas explosion killed 33 men at a mine near Cumberland, British Columbia.
- The Irish Free State proclaimed a 10-day amnesty for rebel Irish republicans, granting them a chance to surrender without consequence, after Liam Deasy, the Deputy Chief of the Irish Republican Army, had been captured and persuaded to issue a statement urging other rebels to surrender. Richard Mulcahy, the Minister of Defence and commander-in-chief of the Free State Army, sent a notice that said. "Bearing in mind Liam Deasy's acceptance of the immediate unconditional surrender of all arms and men, the Government offers amnesty to all in arms against the Government who will surrender with their arms on or before Feb. 18."
- Norman Albert called the first live broadcast of an ice hockey game, the third period of an Ontario Hockey League Intermediate playoff game on the Toronto station CFCA.

== February 9, 1923 (Friday) ==
- Billy Hughes resigned as Prime Minister of Australia after his National Party lost its majority in the December 16 elections for the Australian House of Representatives and he was unable to form a coalition government. Hughes's successor as National Party leader, Stanley Bruce, forged a coalition with the Australian Country Party, whose leader, Dr. Earle Page, accepted the job of Treasurer of Australia.
- Turkey withdrew its demands for foreign warships to leave the Smyrna Harbor, notifying the British and French navy admirals that it would maintain the status quo until the matter of occupation could be resolved through diplomatic means. An ultimatum to withdraw ships from the harbor had expired at sunset the day before, with no indication from any of the Allied powers that they had any intent to move any of the vessels.
- The Soviet Russian airline Aeroflot was founded, six days after the Sovnarkom had approved an expansion of the Red Air Fleet, and began operations under the name Dobrolet.
- An uprising at Lukyanivska Prison in Kiev killed 38 prisoners and one Red Army soldier.
- The entire German town of Recklinghausen went on strike against French occupation.
- Born: Brendan Behan, Irish playwright and novelist; in Dublin, Irish Free State (d. 1964)

== February 10, 1923 (Saturday) ==
- Harold Lloyd married his Hollywood co-star Mildred Davis.
- The Owen Davis play Icebound premiered at New York's Sam H. Harris Theater.
- Governor Pat Neff of Texas signed the bill passed by the Texas State Legislature to create what is now Texas Tech University in Lubbock, the first public university to serve the residents of the 70 counties of the region of West Texas. Neff had vetoed an earlier attempt to create the university in 1921.
- Born:
  - Allie Sherman, American football player and coach; as Alex Sherman, in Brooklyn, New York (d. 2015)
  - Cesare Siepi, Italian opera singer; in Milan (d. 2010)

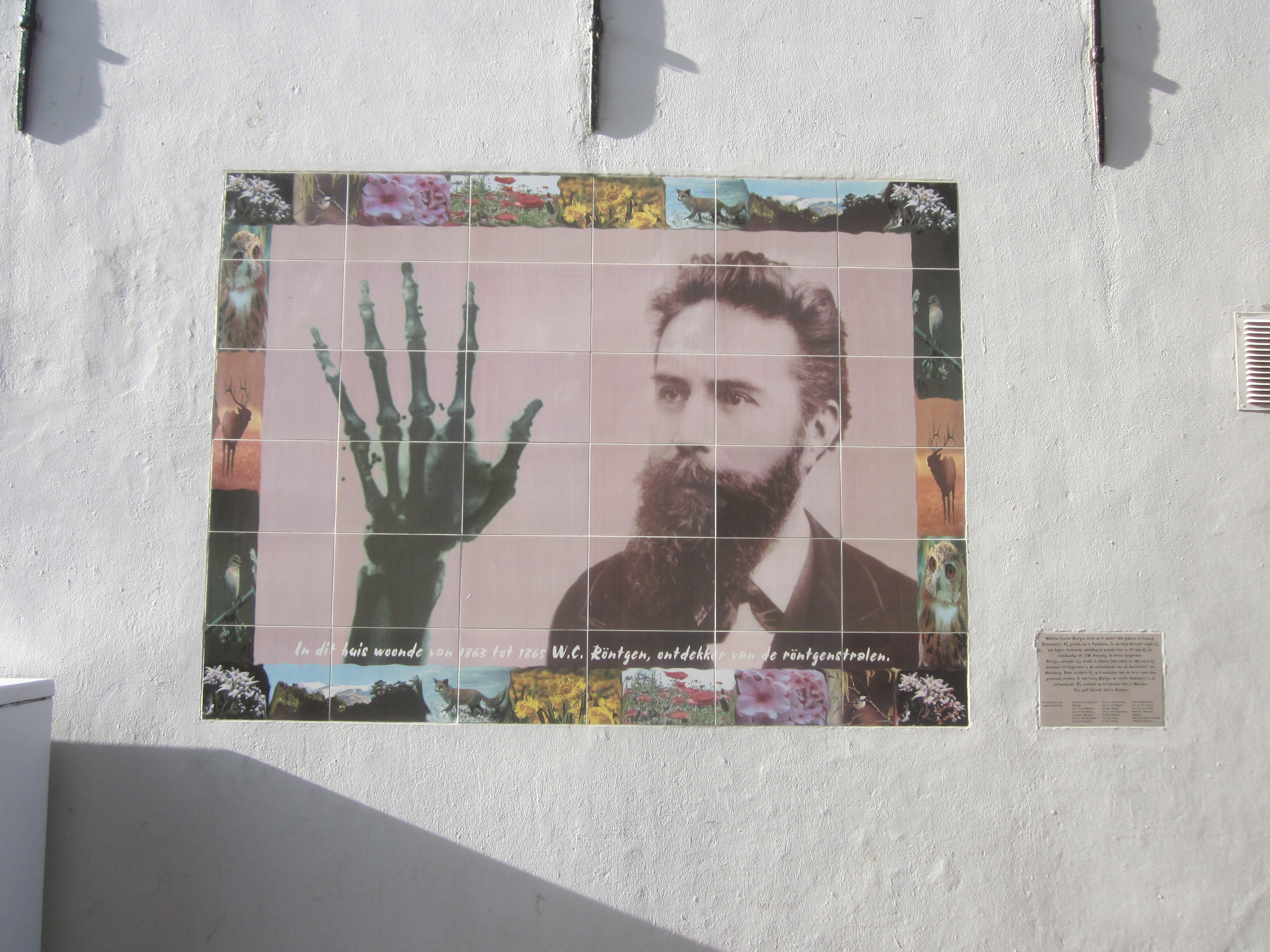
An illustration of Roentgen and his discovery, made by Jackie Sleper for display at Roentgen's home in Utrecht

- Died: Wilhelm Röntgen, 77, German physicist who was the first to discover and reproduce x-rays and won the first Nobel Prize in Physics in 1914 (b. 1845). Named in his honor (in addition to the official name of x-ray radiation, "Roentgen rays"; the "roentgenogram" image, commonly called "an x-ray"; and the roentgen as the unit of measure of exposure to radiation) is the element Roentgenium, atomic number 111.

== February 11, 1923 (Sunday) ==
- France and Belgium announced they would bar all exports from the Ruhr region to unoccupied Germany starting at midnight.
- Born:
  - Noriko Sawada Bridges Flynn, Japanese American writer and civil rights activist; as Noriko Sawada, in Gardena, California (d. 2003)
  - Rosita Fornés, American-born Cuban singer and actress in film and on television in Cuba; as Rosalía Lourdes Elisa Palet Bonavia, in New York City (d. 2020)

== February 12, 1923 (Monday) ==
- The majority Social Democratic Party of Germany opposed a special law that would give the German government special powers in dealing with the Ruhr region.
- The drama film Jazzmania was released.
- Born:
  - Franco Zeffirelli, Italian film and opera director; as Gian Franco Corsi Zeffirelli, in Florence(d. 2019)
  - Mel Powell, American jazz music composer; as Melvin Epstein, in The Bronx, New York City (d. 1998)
- Died: Robert Tigerstedt, 69, Finnish-born Swedish scientist and physiologist (b. 1853)

== February 13, 1923 (Tuesday) ==
- Italy's ruling Grand Fascist Council passed a resolution stating that no member of the Fascist Party could also be a Freemason, and anyone who was a member of both had to resign from one organization or the other. The resolution stated that the Grand Council "invites all Fascisti who are also Free Masons to choose between belonging to the Fascista National Party or to Freemasonry, because the Fascisti can only recognize a discipline which is the Fascista discipline."
- The New York Renaissance all-black professional basketball team, commonly called "The Rens", was established as a touring group that would eventually play both black and white players, and usually defeat them. The Rens would win the first World Professional Basketball Tournament, held annually from 1939 to 1948.
- The first radio station in Wales, 5WA Cardiff, went on the air at 5:00 in the afternoon. At 9:00 that evening, Mostyn Thomas, sang "Dafydd y Garreg Wen", which was the first Welsh language song to be broadcast. 5WA Cardiff would operate until 1933.
- Alfred E. Smith, the recently inaugurated governor of the U.S. state of New York issued pardons to the last four anarchists, whom he described as "political prisoners", still imprisoned for violating state law. The move came a few weeks after Smith had freed agitator "Big Jim" Larkin who had been convicted under the same rule against sedition. "Evidence upon which they were convicted was much the same as that urged upon the trial of Larkin," Smith said of the remaining four prisoners. "Their offense consisted of spreading literature concerning the Communist Party." He added, "They made the mistake of understanding liberty and freedom as a license. While they should not be encouraged, no good can come from their further punishment, and they undoubtedly understand by this time what is meant by the majesty and dignity of the law."
- The U.S. Senate voted, 63 to 6, to approve the proposal of Senator George W. Norris of Nebraska to amend the U.S. Constitution to change the date for inauguration of the U.S. president and of Congress from March to January, and to have newly elected officials take office less than three months after their election, rather than 13 months. Norris's initial proposal was to change the presidential and vice-presidential inauguration from March 4 to "the third Monday in January following their election", and for U.S. Representatives and Senators to take office on the first Monday in January. The measure would fail to reach a vote in the House of Representatives, but Norris persisted and the 20th Amendment to the U.S. Constitution (which sets the inauguration dates as January 20 for the president and January 3 for the Congress) would be ratified in 1933. Senator Norris had first proposed an amendment that the U.S. Senate had approved, 63 to 6, on February 13, 1923, that would have set the beginning of the new presidential and vice-presidential terms on and for Congress to be the first Monday in January but the legislation had not been voted on in the House.
- France fined the town of Recklinghausen 100 million marks for its disobedience. The public workers of Gelsenkirchen also went on strike in response.
- The Belgians occupied Emmerich am Rhein and Wesel, cutting the Ruhr off from the Netherlands.
- Born:
  - Chuck Yeager, U.S. Air Force test pilot who became the first person to "break the sound barrier" by flying faster than Mach 1 in 1947; as Charles Yeager, in Myra, West Virginia (d. 2020)
  - Yfrah Neaman, Lebanese violinist; in Sidon (d. 2003)

== February 14, 1923 (Wednesday) ==
- The first broadcast of a National Hockey League game was made by the Toronto radio station CFCA, which did a play-by-play of the third and final period of a game between the Toronto St. Patricks (now the Toronto Maple Leafs) and the visiting Ottawa Senators (a defunct team unrelated to the later NHL team of the same name). Toronto won the game, 6 to 4.
- The government of the German city of Gelsenkirchen refused to pay a 100,000,000 fine levied as an indemnity for the wounding of two French Army soldiers in a clash with local police. In retaliation, the French occupation force arrested several of the town's top bankers and then sent troops into the Gelsenkirchen City Hall and collected 85 million marks from the treasury, followed by 17 million more from the railroad station.
- The number of daily newspapers in the U.S. city of Pittsburgh was reduced from five to three when the competing Pittsburgh Post, The Gazette Times and the Pittsburgh Press formed a consortium to purchase and retire the 77-year-old Pittsburgh Dispatch (for whom Nellie Bly had worked) and the Pittsburgh Leader (for whom Willa Cather and Lillian Russell had worked).

== February 15, 1923 (Thursday) ==
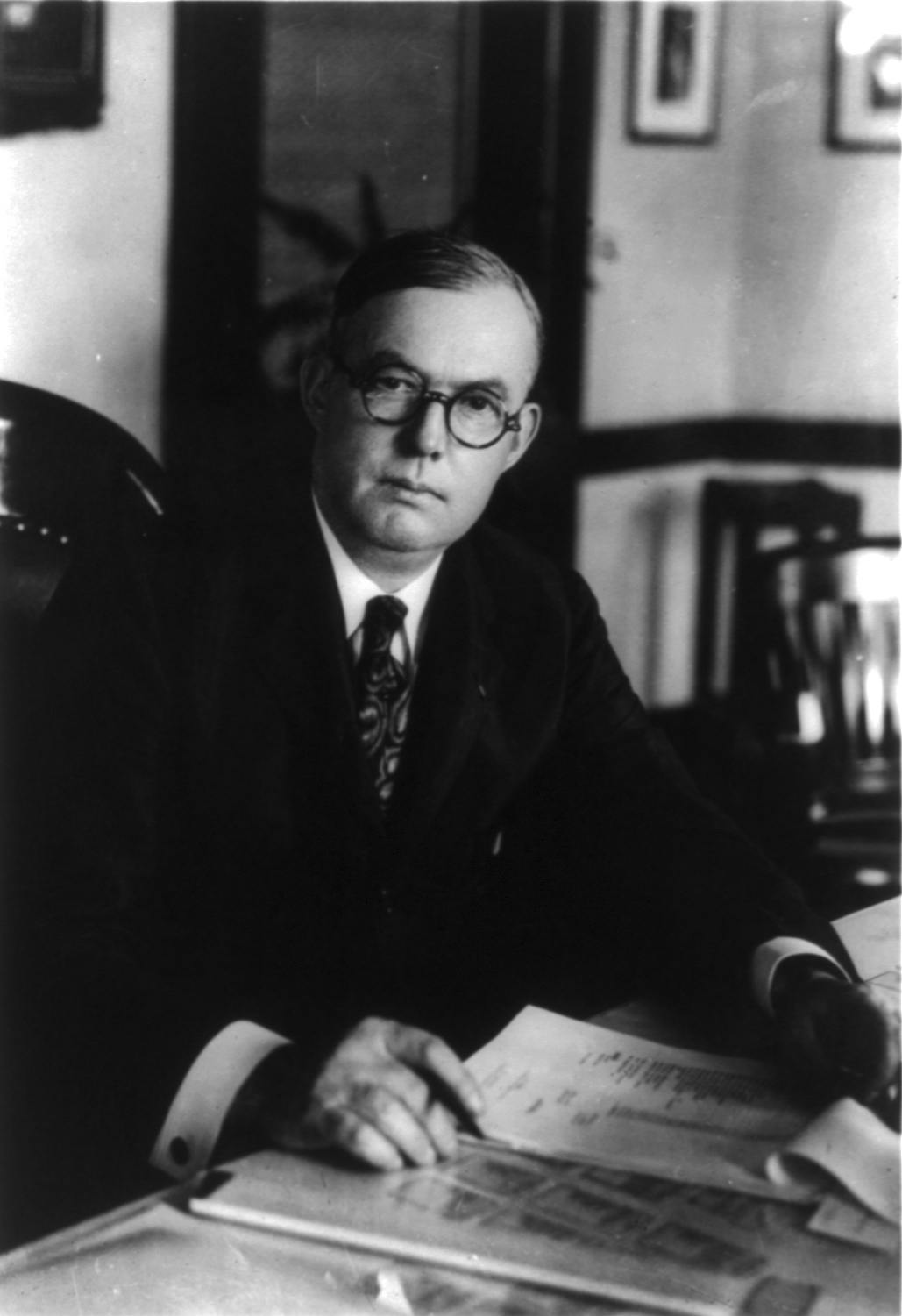
Director Forbes

- Charles R. Forbes, Director of the U.S. Veterans' Bureau, resigned at the request of U.S. President Warren G. Harding amid suspicions that he had been selling surplus supplies at absurdly low prices to private contractors in exchange for kickbacks. Forbes tendered his resignation while in Europe, where he had gone after being angrily confronted by President Harding in a physical altercation.
- In order to accommodate the arrival of hundreds of thousands of Greek refugees from Turkey, the government of Greece expropriated the lands of the Cham Albanians, the Muslim minority in Epirus, which had been divided between Greece and Albania following the Treaty of Bucharest that ended the Second Balkan War. While the Cham Muslim families were able to keep one home and the land upon which it was built, additional dwellings were expropriated. Compensation for the value of the land was given, if at all, at the 1914 market price rather than that of 1923.
- French pilot Joseph Sadi-Lecointe flew faster than any person ever before, setting a new speed record in his Nieuport-Delage NiD 42 airplane and reaching 391.304 km/h (243.145 mph) by flying the first kilometer in 9.2 seconds on a 4 km course. His average speed over the course was 377.657 km/h or 234.064 mph.
- The first issue of the French literary magazine Europe was published.
- Born:
  - Adolfo Faustino Sardiña, Cuban-born American fashion designer who went professionally by the single name Adolfo; in Cárdenas (d. 2021)
  - Jim Ostendarp, American football player and coach; in Baltimore (d. 2005)

== February 16, 1923 (Friday) ==
- After 32 centuries, the inner chamber of the Tomb of Tutankhamun was opened in Egypt near Luxor, as Howard Carter and his archaeological team broke the seal and went inside to find the sarcophagus of the boy pharaoh of Egypt. Present were 20 invited witnesses, including the expedition sponsor, George Herbert. Inside the tomb were 5,398 separate items, most prominently Tutankhamun's solid gold coffin. In the Egyptian chronology, agreed upon by the majority of Egyptologists, Tutankhamun is believed to have died in 1323 B.C.
- The Conference of Ambassadors of the Allied Powers (the UK, France, Italy and Japan) approved the transfer of the Memel Territory, a mandate of the League of Nations, to the control of Lithuania in the aftermath of the Klaipėda Revolt and Lithuania's invasion of the area that had formerly been part of Germany. The League subsequently withdrew its peacekeeping troops. The transfer was conditioned on the negotiation of a formal international treaty, which would be signed on May 8, 1924.
- Under pressure from dictator Benito Mussolini, the Italian Senate voted to ratify both the Washington Naval Treaty on disarmament (signed in April) and the Treaty of Santa Margherita (signed in October to settle the territorial dispute with Yugoslavia). The treaties had previously been approved by the Italian Chamber of Deputies after two days of debate, while the Italian senators debated for less than one day before voting their approval.

== February 17, 1923 (Saturday) ==
- The British Indian government announced the "Eight Unit Scheme of Indianisation" of the Indian Army, to be under the command of Indian military officers with the certification as King's Commissioned Indian Officer (KCIO) after training at one of the military institutes in Britain. Only five of the 104 British Indian Army battalions, two of the 21 cavalry regiments and one of the seven pioneer battalions were selected for Indianisation.
- Born:
  - Kathleen Freeman, American character actress and comedian; in Chicago (d. 2001)
  - Jun Fukuda, Japanese filmmaker; in Changchun, Jilin province, China (d. 2000)
  - Madan Mani Dixit, Nepalese novelist; in Kathmandu (d. 2019)
  - Elisabeth Lindermeier, German operatic soprano; in Munich(d. 1998)
- Died: Wilhelmina Gelhaar, 85, Swedish operatic soprano (b. 1837)

== February 18, 1923 (Sunday) ==
- A fire on the fourth floor of the Manhattan State Hospital for the Insane on Wards Island in New York City, the largest psychiatric hospital in the world at the time, killed 24 patients and three attendants.
- A train accident in France killed 27 people when the Paris-Strasbourg express hit a freight train.
- The 10-day amnesty period within the Irish Free State, for Irish Republicans to surrender their weapons, came to an end. W. T. Cosgrave, the head of government as President of the Executive Council issued a warning that if anyone continued in "this unnatural war upon his people after the expiration of amnesty period, he must be prepared to pay the price in full, for there will be no going back on this."
- The original mark for marathon dancing was set in Sunderland when a couple danced for seven hours straight.
- The silent movie Stormswept, a suspense film starring brothers Wallace Beery and Noah Beery, and promoted as "A Mighty Drama of Shattered Souls Reborn Upon the Sea", was released by Film Booking Offices of America.
- Born:
  - Micheline Legendre, Canadian puppeteer who performed with her troupe, Les marionnettes de Montréal; in Outremont, Quebec (d. 2010)
  - Major Donald Nichols, United States Air Force intelligence officer during the Korean War; in Hackensack, New Jersey (d. 1992)
  - Lieutenant General Donald Dunstan, Australian Army officer who served as the Governor of South Australia from 1982 to 1991; in Murray Bridge, South Australia (d. 2011)
- Died:
  - Alois Rašín, 55, Czech politician, economist and one of the founders of Czechoslovakia, served as the country's first Minister of Finance; died from gunshot wounds inflicted on him by an assassin on January 5 (b. 1867)
  - Henry Brougham, 34, English rugby union star for the England national team prior to World War I; died from injuries in his lungs from mustard gas used by the German Army against his unit in 1917 (b. 1888)

== February 19, 1923 (Monday) ==
- The U.S. Supreme Court decided the case of United States v. Bhagat Singh Thind, upholding a lower court determination that the definition of "white persons" did not extend to light-skinned persons who were not of European descent for purposes of naturalized U.S. citizenship. The action had been brought by Bhagat Singh Thind, a native of Punjab who had served with the U.S. Army in World War One. The Naturalization Act of 1906 limited naturalization to "free white men" and to "persons of African nativity or persons of African descent". Bhagat remained in the U.S. despite the revocation of his citizenship and would later be made a citizen when war veterans were made eligible regardless of race.
- The Supreme Court also decided in Moore v. Dempsey that federal courts had the right to review the results of state criminal trials to determine whether the defendant's U.S. constitutional rights had been violated, and to reverse a state decision if the Constitution had not been followed. The 1919 conviction of 12 African American men in the U.S. state of Arkansas had been reviewed after the Court granted a petition for a writ of habeas corpus brought by one of the defense attorneys.
- The sixth symphony of Finnish composer Jean Sibelius was performed for the first time. Sibelius himself conducted the premiere by the Helsinki Philharmonic Orchestra.
- Edward Terry Sanford of Tennessee was sworn in as the new Associate Justice of the U.S. Supreme Court and would serve until his death in 1930. Sanford's entry returned the Court to its full roster of nine justices for the first time since the new term began in October.
- The film The Gentleman from America, starring Hoot Gibson, was released.

== February 20, 1923 (Tuesday) ==
- Retired baseball star Christy Mathewson became the new president of the Boston Braves.
- Born:
  - Forbes Burnham, President of Guyana from 1980 to 1985; as Linden Forbes Sampson Burnham, in Georgetown, British Guiana (d. 1985)
  - Helen Murray Free, American chemist and inventor who created the home tests of blood and urine for detection of diabetes and high blood sugar; as Helen Murray, in Pittsburgh (d. 2021)
- Died: Sir Thomas George Roddick, 76, Canadian surgeon and MP who founded the Medical Council of Canada to authored the Canada Medical Act for standard medial licensing (b. 1846)

== February 21, 1923 (Wednesday) ==
- An uneasy truce in the "Egan-Hogan war" between Egan's Rats and the Hogan Gang, the two main organized criminal gangs in the U.S. city of St. Louis, Missouri, came to an end after eight months when Dint Colbeck of the Rats invaded the Hogan territory on the city's north side and killed Jacob Mackler, a lawyer for the Hogan Gang.
- The libel trial between Marie Stopes and Dr. Halliday Sutherland opened in the High Court, London.
- The Revenue Commissioners government agency was created in Ireland.
- Born: Friedrich Obleser, Austrian-born German ace fighter pilot with 120 aerial victories in World War II and served as the Commander of the West German Air Force; in Pottenstein (d. 2004)

== February 22, 1923 (Thursday) ==
- The first landing on a ship designed as an aircraft carrier was made on the Imperial Japanese Navy carrier Hōshō, which had been commissioned on December 27. One of several British pilots supplied under a contract between the Sempill Mission and the Imperial Navy, landed on the new Mitsubishi 1MF carrier fighter airplane, designed by British engineer Herbert Smith, on the 552 feet (168 m) long and 74.25 feet (22.63 m) wide flight deck. The first takeoff was made six days later by test pilot William Jordan.
- Prince George, Duke of Kent, brother of Prince Albert, Duke of York (who would take the name George VI upon becoming King of the United Kingdom), had both of his small toes amputated to cure a painful hammer toe condition.
- A fiery explosion at the Wheldale Colliery in Castleford, West Yorkshire, fatally injured nine coal miners. One man died at the scene, and the other eight died later from their burns.
- The Supreme Court of Canada upheld a decision annulling the election of Robert Milton Johnson in the 1921 voting for the Canadian House of Commons. Johnson was expelled from the House the same day.
- Born: Norman Smith, English musician, record producer and engineer; in Edmonton, London (d. 2008)
- Died:Théophile Delcassé, 70, French politician and statesman (b. 1852)

== February 23, 1923 (Friday) ==
- U.S. President Warren G. Harding established the first strategic petroleum reserve in the nation, Naval Petroleum Reserve Number 4, by Executive Order #3797.
- Gene Tunney beat Harry Greb in a close match at Madison Square Garden to retake the American light heavyweight boxing championship.
- The Declaration of the Rights of the Child, written by Eglantyne Jebb, the English social worker who founded the Save the Children organization, was published in Geneva. It would be adopted by the League of Nations on November 26, 1924, as the World Child Welfare Charter.
- The Governor of the Mexican state of Yucatán sent notice to the American press, by way of a press release to all consulates in the U.S., that Yucatán's laws on divorce had been amended to make the legal dissolution of marriage easy and inexpensive. Governor Felipe Carrillo Puerto advertised that a divorce by mutual consent could be had for $45 costs and a contested divorce without cause could be obtained after a 30-day period for reconciliation. The only requirement for getting the divorce was for the petitioner to live in Yucatán for 30 days before an order could become final.
- The Freistaat Flaschenhals, literally the "Free State of the Bottleneck", was abolished by the French occupational government in the Ruhr. The "free state", based in Lorch am Rhein in what is now the German state of Hesse, had been established in 1919 in an area between the occupational zones of the U.S. and France.
- Major General Henry Allen, who had been the military governor of the U.S. occupation zone in Germany and commanded the American Expeditionary Force occupation troops that had recently withdrawn, left the fortress of Ehrenbreitstein in Koblenz, ending the first U.S. occupation of European territory.
- A fast-moving fire killed 13 residents of an 18-unit apartment building in Kansas City, Missouri, after starting in the H & H Garage on the ground floor of the structure. Another 21 were able to escape down stairways with less than 15 minutes between the sounding of the alarm and the building's destruction.
- The King Vidor-directed drama film The Woman of Bronze was released.
- Born:
  - Hal Cooper, American TV director and producer known for the situation comedies Maude and I Dream of Jeannie; as Harold Cooper, in The Bronx, New York City (d. 2014)
  - Clarence D. Lester, African American fighter pilot with the Tuskegee Airmen, known for shooting down three German fighters in one mission; in Richmond, Virginia (d. 1986)
  - Mary Francis Shura, American novelist; as Mary Francis Young, in Pratt, Kansas (d. 1991)
  - Nguyen Chanh Thi, South Vietnamese military leader who lead a coup d'état against the government in 1964 and became part of the ruling military junta until his own overthrow; in Huế, French Indochina (present-day Vietnam) (d. 2007)
- Died: Ahmad Dahlan, 54, Indonesian Muslim leader who founde the Muhammadiyah Society (b. 1868)

== February 24, 1923 (Saturday) ==
- U.S. President Warren G. Harding sent a special message to the Senate calling on the body to give him the authority to have the United States join the World Court. The Senate declined to vote on the matter.
- The first naming of an extraterrestrial object for the United States was made when officials of the Pulkovo Observatory in the Soviet Union voted to approve the renaming of the asteroid 916 to 916 America.
- Born:
  - David Soyer, American cellist; in Philadelphia (d. 2010)
  - Fred Steiner, American composer and conductor known for music used in various TV shows, including Star Trek, Hogan's Heroes and Gunsmoke; in New York City (d. 2011)
- Died: Major General William P. Biddle, 69, served as the 11th Commandant of the Marine Corps from 1911 to 1914 (b. 1853)

== February 25, 1923 (Sunday) ==
- French troops occupied Kaub, Lorch and Königswinter.
- Born: Nathan Glazer, American sociologist; in New York City (d. 2019)

== February 26, 1923 (Monday) ==
- The excavation site of the Tomb of Tutankhamun at Luxor was closed by Howard Carter and Arthur Callender, who arranged to have the door to the tomb blocked and then filled the excavation with tons of sand and rubble until work could resume in the autumn. The reburial of the tomb came two days after The New York Times had broken the news that 250 American tourists aboard the liner S.S. Adriatic were "bound for Luxor to visit the famous royal tomb", including U.S. Senator Oscar Underwood of Alabama and Congressmen Allen T. Treadway (Massachusetts) and Wallace H. White (Maine).
- Indian nationalist Kishan Singh Gargaj, one of the founders of the Babbar Akali movement against the colonial authorities of British India, was arrested in Mahal in the Punjab Province after being turned in by a friend for an award of 2,000 rupees. Kishan Singh would be hanged by the British government three years and one day later.
- Prince Aloys of Liechtenstein, second in line for the throne of the European principality of Liechtenstein as nephew of Prince Johann II and of Crown Prince Franz, renounced his right of succession in favor of his son, Franz Joseph.
- The Charlie Chaplin film The Pilgrim was released.
- Died: George Clement Perkins, 83, American senator and Governor of California from 1880 to 1883 (b. 1839)

== February 27, 1923 (Tuesday) ==
- Britain's first dance music radio programme was broadcast when Marius B. Winter and his band played for over an hour with a news bulletin as an interlude.
- Born:
  - Alejandro Zaffaroni, Uruguayan biochemist and entrepreneur, founder of Alza Pharmaceuticals, Affymetrix, Symyx Technologies and Maxygen; in Montevideo (d. 2014)
  - Thérèse Vanier, English physician, humanitarian and co-founder of the L'Arche non-profit organization; in Camberley, Surrey (d. 2014)
  - Dexter Gordon, American bebop jazz saxophonist and actor; in Los Angeles (d. 1990)
  - Chuck Wayne, American bebop jazz guitarist; as Charles Jagelka, in New York City (d. 1997)

== February 28, 1923 (Wednesday) ==
- The nation of Greece used the Julian calendar for the last time before adopting the Gregorian calendar, used by most of the world, the next day. In that the Julian calendar was 13 days behind the Gregorian, the day was noted as "February 15". The next day was March 1 rather than February 16.
- U.S. President Harding signed the Smoot-Burton Act (officially the British War Debt Act of 1923) into law, a compromise of the United Kingdom's debt to the U.S. arising from World War I loans, setting the value at $4,604,004,128,000 with a scheduled payment of $4,128,000 for a round figure of exactly $4.6 billion to be financed with British bonds.
- The University of Kansas Jayhawks, declared retroactively by the Helms Athletic Foundation to have been the champions of the 1922-23 basketball season, played their final game of the season with a rematch against the University of Missouri Tigers, whom they had narrowly beaten earlier on January 16. Going in to the game, Kansas had a 16–1 record overall, and Missouri was at 15–2. (in conference play in the Missouri Valley Association, the teams were 15-0 and 14–1, respectively). Kansas won, 23 to 20.
- The French occupational force in the Ruhr had all the police in Bochum and Herne transported away from their towns.
- Born:
  - Jean Carson, American actress; in Charleston, West Virginia (d. 2005)
  - Charles Durning, American actor; in Highland Falls, New York (d. 2012)
