= Georgian maneti =

Former currency of Georgia

Georgian maneti (Boni)
მანეთი (ბონი) (Georgian)
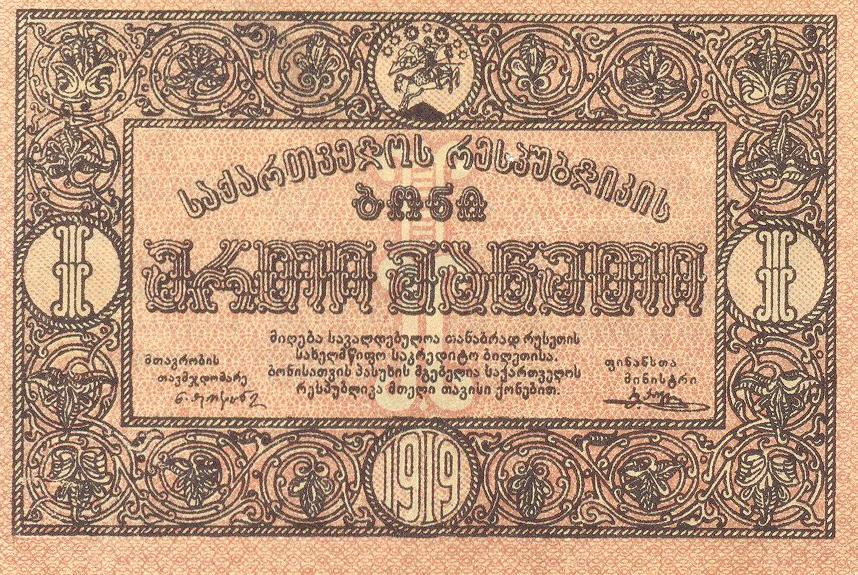
- 1 maneti note (1919)

Units of account
- Plural: მანეთები (manetebi); not used when prefixed by a number
- Subunit
- 1/100: kopeck

Denominations
- Banknotes: 50 kopecks, 1, 3, 5, 10, 50, 100, 500, 1,000, 5,000, 10,000, 100,000, 500,000, 1,000,000, 5,000,000 maneti

Demographics
- Date of introduction: 1919
- Date of withdrawal: 1923
- User(s): Democratic Republic of Georgia
- This infobox shows the latest status before this currency was rendered obsolete.

The maneti (Georgian: მანეთი) was the currency of the Democratic Republic of Georgia and the Georgian Soviet Socialist Republic between 1919 and 1923. It replaced the first Transcaucasian rouble at par and was subdivided into 100 kopecks (კაპეიკი k’ap’eik’i). It was replaced by the second Transcaucasian rouble after Georgia became part of the Transcaucasian Socialist Federative Soviet Republic.

After the formation of the Transcaucasian Democratic Federative Republic in 1918, Georgia, Armenia and Azerbaijan began issuing a single currency unit called the Transcaucasian ruble.

On May 26, 1918, the Transcaucasian Democratic Federative Republic was disbanded, resulting in the formation of three new republics in the South Caucasus: Georgian, Armenian and Azerbaijani.Georgia began issuing its own currency units called Georgian rubles (maneti), which were also called "Georgian boni".

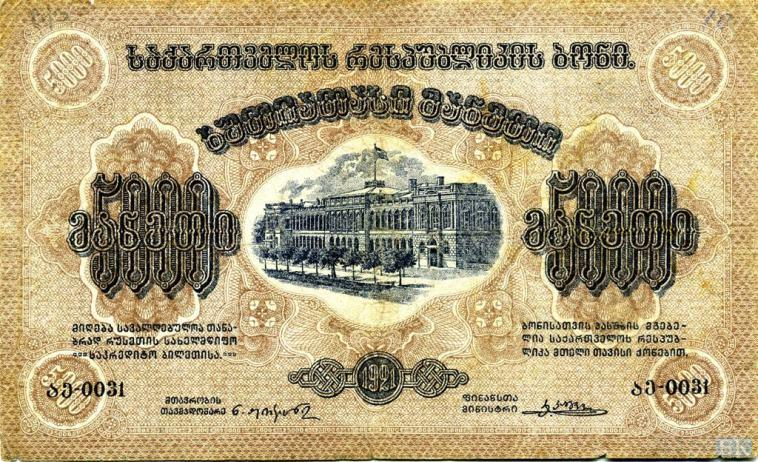
5000 Rubles (Maneti) of the Democratic Republic of Georgia

Only paper money was issued, with the Democratic Republic producing denominations of between 50 kopecks and 5,000 maneti. Except for the 50 kopecks, the reverses of the notes bore the denomination in French (roubles) and Russian. In 1922 the GSSR issued denominations between 5,000 and 5 million maneti.

Maneti, derived from the Latin moneta ("coin"), was used as the Georgian name for the Soviet rouble. The modern Georgian currency is the lari.
