= Mahal, Punjab =

Mahal ਮਾਹਲ
- Village
- Location in Punjab, India Mahal (India)
- Coordinates: 31.1387419°N 75.7756287°E
- Country: India
- State: Punjab
- District: Jalandhar

Government
  - Type: Panchayat raj
  - Body: Gram panchayat
- Elevation: 240 m (790 ft)

Population (2011)
  - Total: 3,380
- Sex ratio 1731/1649 ♂/♀

Languages
  - Official: Punjabi
- Time zone: UTC+5:30 (IST)
- PIN: 144409
- ISO 3166 code: IN-PB
- Vehicle registration: PB- 08
- Website: jalandhar.nic.in

Mahal (Punjabi: ਮਾਹਲ) is a village in Jalandhar district of Punjab State, India. It is located 2.7 km (walking distance) away from Goraya, 18.5 km from Phillaur, 33 km from district headquarter Jalandhar and 136 km from state capital Chandigarh. The village is administrated by a sarpanch who is an elected representative of village as per Panchayati raj (India).

== Demography ==
According to the report published by Census India in 2011, Mahal has a total number of 691 houses and population of 3380 of which include 1731 males and 1649 females. Literacy rate of Mahal is 83.05%, higher than state average of 75.84%. The population of children under the age of 6 years is 335 which is 9.91% of total population of Mahal, and child sex ratio is approximately 745 lower than state average of 846.

As per census 2011, 1019 people were engaged in work activities out of the total population of Mahal which includes 887 males and 132 females. According to census survey report 2011, 86.75% workers describe their work as main work and 13.25% workers are involved in marginal activity providing livelihood for less than 6 months.

== Transport ==
Goraya railway station is the nearest train station however, Phagwara Junction train station is 11.3 km away from the village. The village is 48.6 km away from domestic airport in Ludhiana and the nearest international airport is located in Chandigarh also Sri Guru Ram Dass Jee International Airport is the second nearest airport which is 127 km away in Amritsar.
