= Azerbaijani ruble =

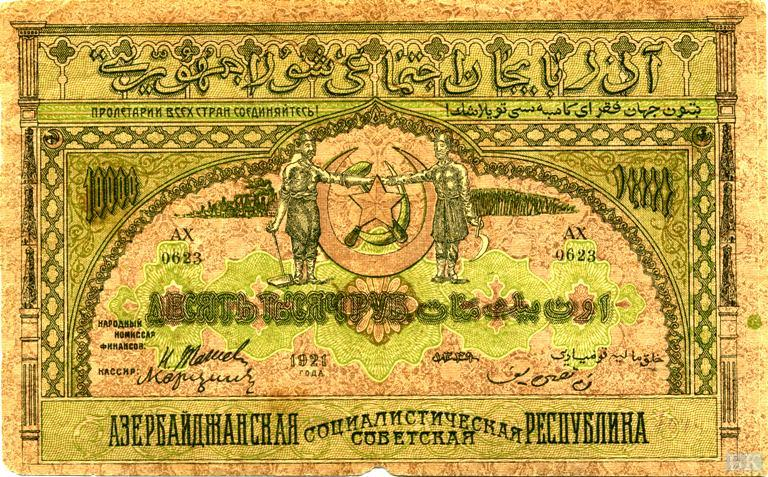

The ruble (Azerbaijani: rublu, Russian: рублей), or manat (Azerbaijani: منات), was the currency of several state entities on the territory of Azerbaijan from 1918 to 1923.

== History ==
On January 19, 1918, the Baku City Council began issuing the so-called "Baku money". This was the first issue of paper money in the post-revolutionary Transcaucasia. In February of the same year, the Transcaucasian Commissariat began issuing booms (the first Transcaucasian ruble, “zakbon”), which were issued until September 1918 and distributed on a contractual basis between Georgia, Armenia and Azerbaijan. At the same time, the issue of Baku money continued until July 1918. In July the Baku Commune began issuing money from the Municipal Economy Council, which was issued until September 14 of the same year.

In October 1918, the government of the Azerbaijan Democratic Republic began issuing booms. In September 1919, the State Bank of Azerbaijan was established, which began issuing banknotes of the ADR until April 1920.

The issue of paper money of the Azerbaijan Socialist Soviet Republic began in April 1920 and lasted until January 1923. All previous issues of money were cancelled.

On January 10, 1923, the monetary reform was launched, which unified the monetary circulation of Transcaucasia. The issues of Georgia, Armenia and Azerbaijan were stopped, and the banknotes of the Transcaucasian Socialist Soviet Republic (the second Transcaucasian ruble, zakdensnak) were put into circulation. The exchange was carried out in the ratio: 100 Azerbaijani rubles = 1 ruble in foreign currency. The exchange period was originally set from January 10 to March 10, 1923, but was later extended to April 10, 1924.

== Banknotes ==
1. Baku City Council: 5, 15 and 50 kopecks, 1, 3, 5, 10 and 25 rubles. In total, banknotes were issued in the amount of 172,211,911 rubles and 50 kopecks;
2. Council of Municipal Economy: 10, 25 and 50 rubles. In total, 117,459,000 rubles;
3. Azerbaijan Republic: 25, 50, 100, 250 and 500 rubles;
4. Azerbaijan SSR: 5, 100, 1000, 5000, 10 000, 25 000, 50 000, 100 000, 250 000, 1 000 000 and 5,000,000 rubles.

== See also ==
- Azerbaijani manat

== Bibliography ==
- Cuhaj G.S. Standard Catalog of World Paper Money. General Issues 1368—1960. — 12-е изд. — Iola: Krause Publications, 2008. — 1223 с. — ISBN 978-0-89689-730-4
