= Armenian ruble =

Former currency of Armenia

Հայկական ռուբլի (Armenian); Армянский рубль (Russian)
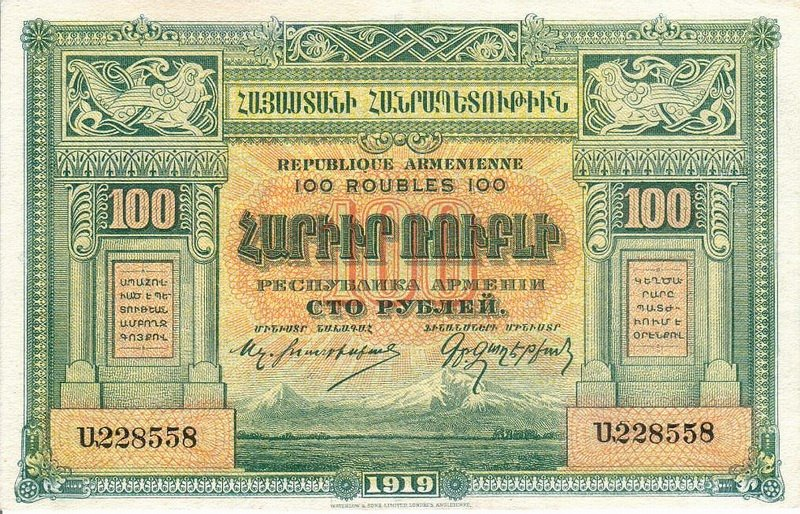
- 100 rubles (1919)

Denominations
- Banknotes: 5, 10, 25, 50, 100, 250, 500, 1,000, 5,000, 10,000, 25,000, 100,000, 500,000, 1,000,000, 5,000,000 rubles
- Coins: None Issued

Demographics
- Date of introduction: August 1919
- Date of withdrawal: 1923
- User(s): Armenia; Armenian SSR

Issuance
- Printer: Waterlow and Sons
- This infobox shows the latest status before this currency was rendered obsolete.

The ruble (Armenian: ռուբլի, Russian: рубль) was the independent currency of the First Republic of Armenia and the Armenian Soviet Socialist Republic between 1919 and 1923. It replaced the first Transcaucasian ruble at par and was replaced by the second Transcaucasian ruble after Armenia became part of the Transcaucasian Soviet Federal Socialist Republic. No subdivisions of the ruble were issued and the currency existed only as banknotes.

== Banknotes ==
Provisional cheques were issued by the First Republic of Armenia in denominations of 5, 10, 25, 50, 100, 250, 500, 1,000, 5,000, and 10,000 rubles. Most were quite crudely printed with mostly Russian text. However, three actual banknotes in denominations of 50, 100 and 250 rubles were printed in the UK by Waterlow and Sons Ltd. The notes were designed by artists Arshak Fetvadjian and Hakob Kojoyan. These notes are adorned with Armenian, French, and Russian text.

The Armenian SSR issued denominations between 5,000, 10,000, 25,000, 100,000, 500,000, 1,000,000, and 5,000,000 rubles. These notes bore Armenian and Russian texts together with communist slogans in various languages on the reverses.

Banknotes issued in Armenia
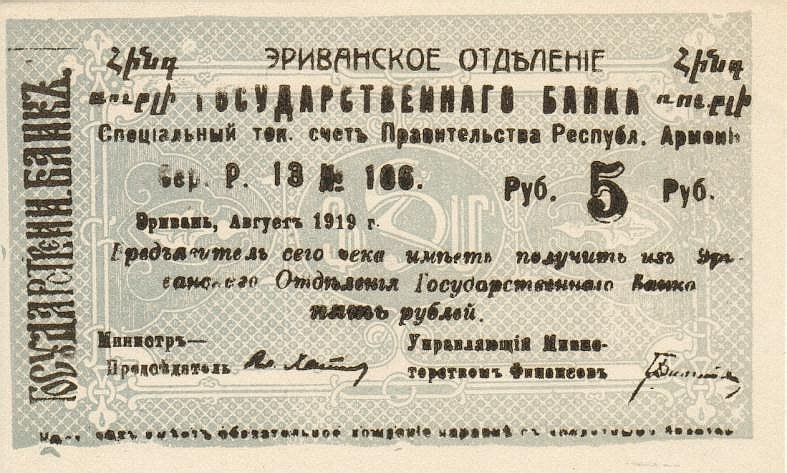

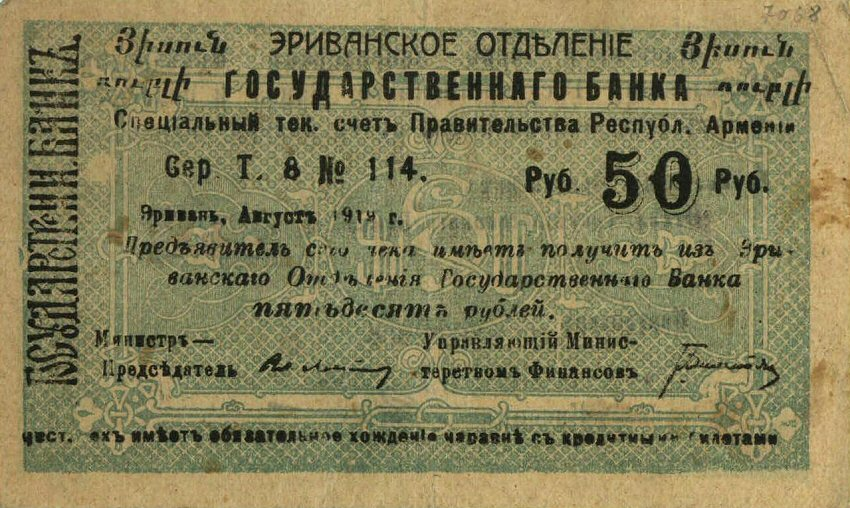

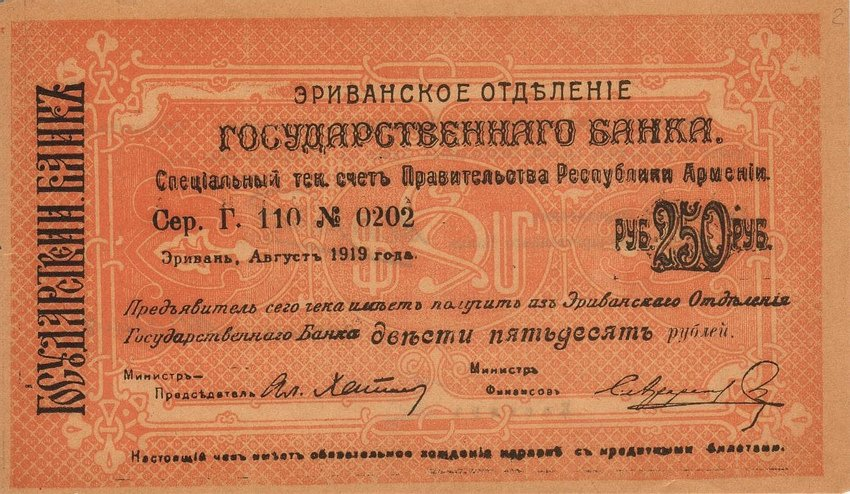

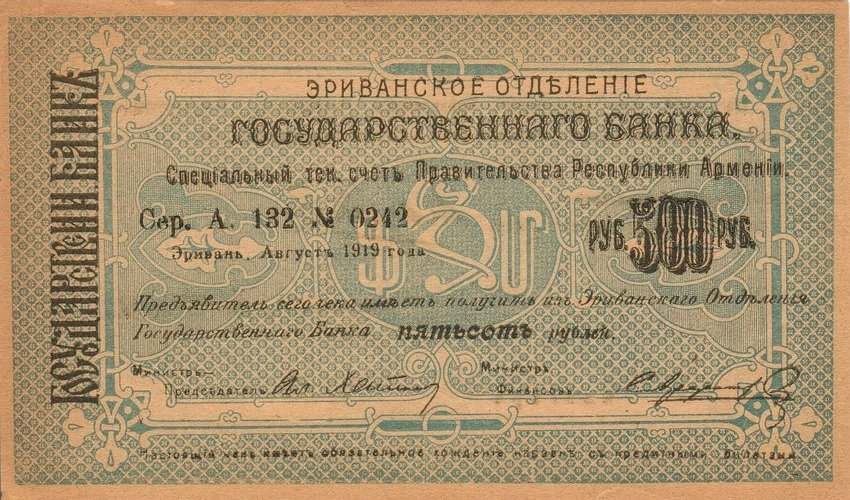

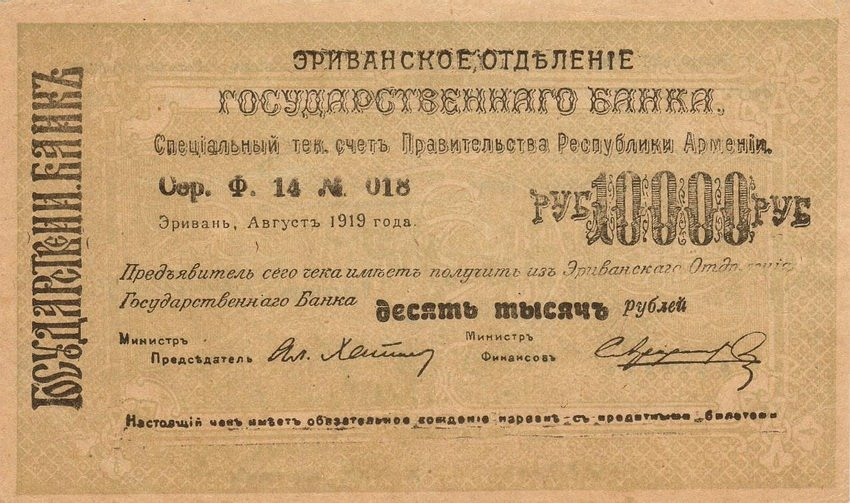

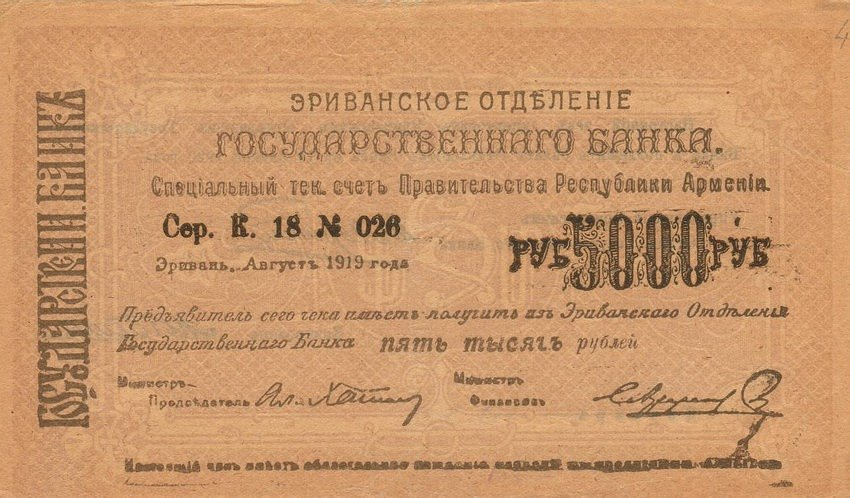

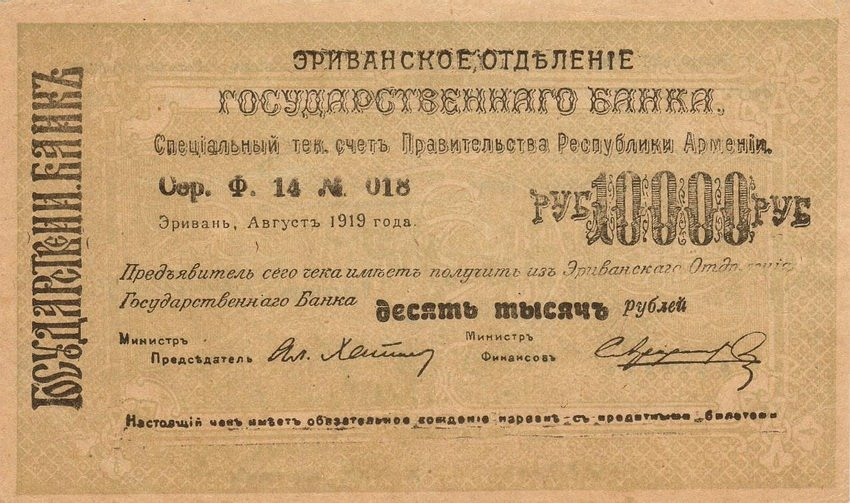

5 ruble 1919

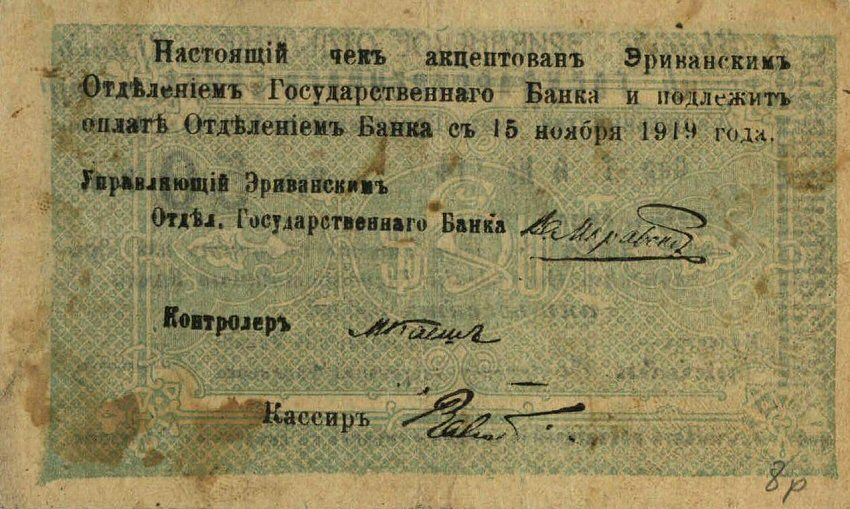
50 ruble 1919

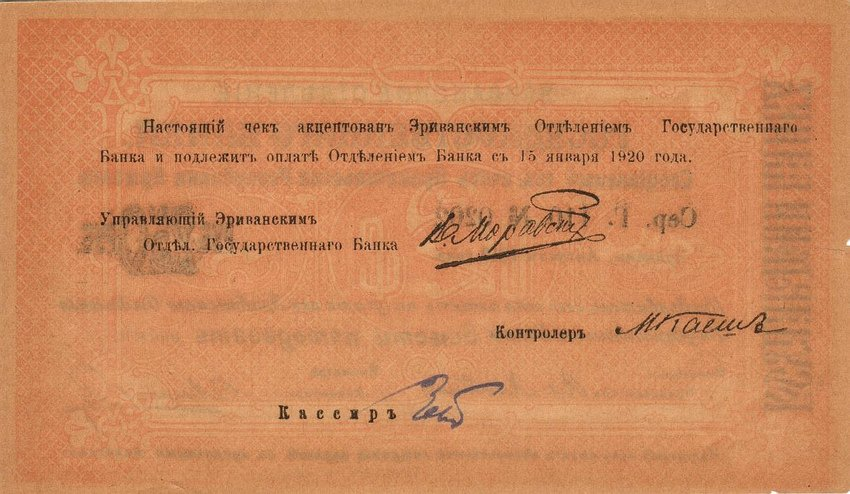
250 ruble 1919

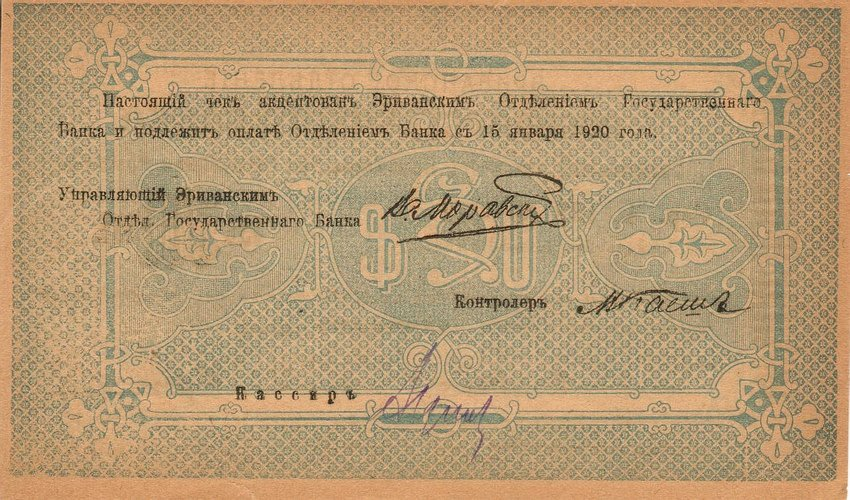
500 ruble 1919

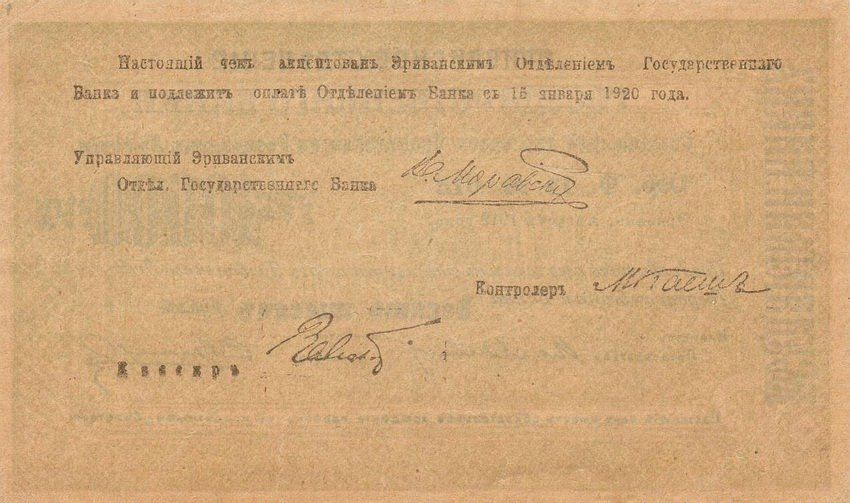
1000 ruble 1919

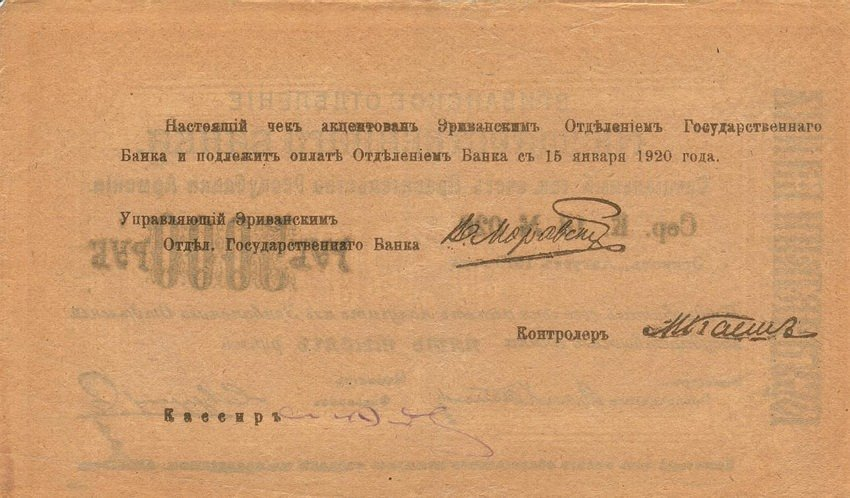
5000 ruble 1919

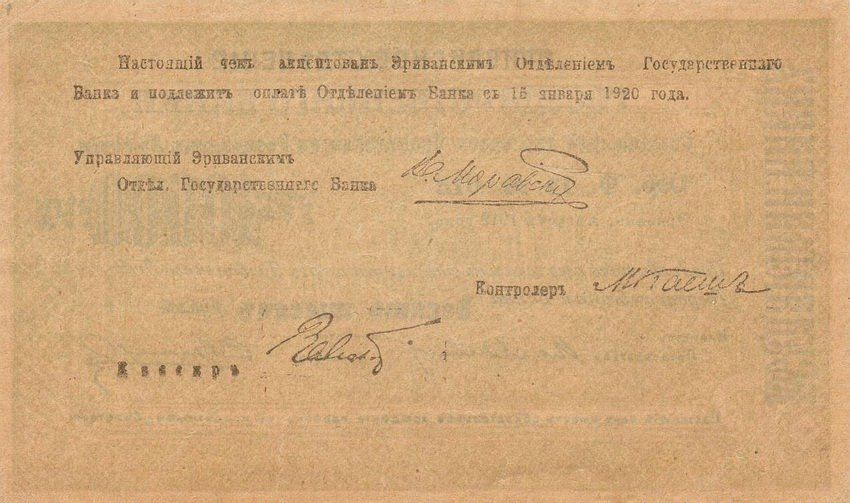
10000 ruble 1919

Banknotes issued in Great Britain
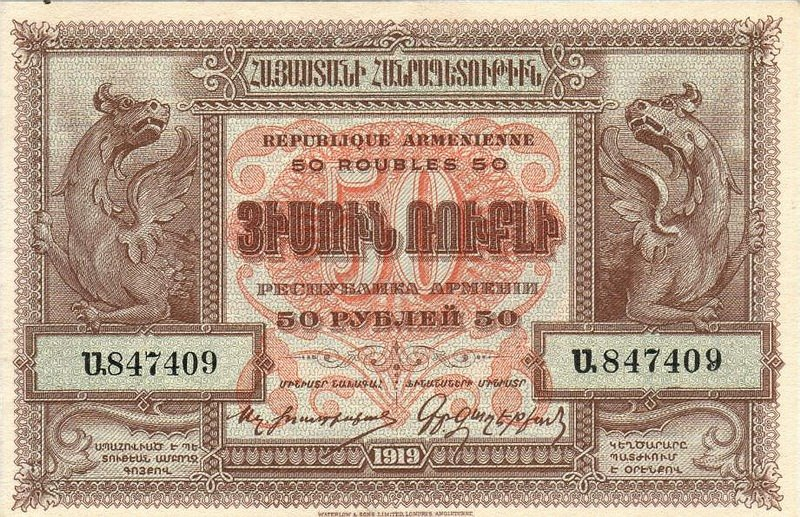

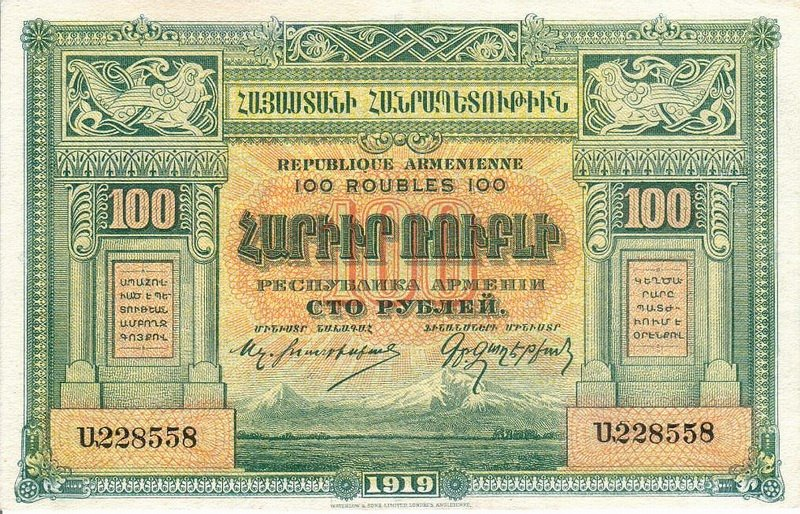

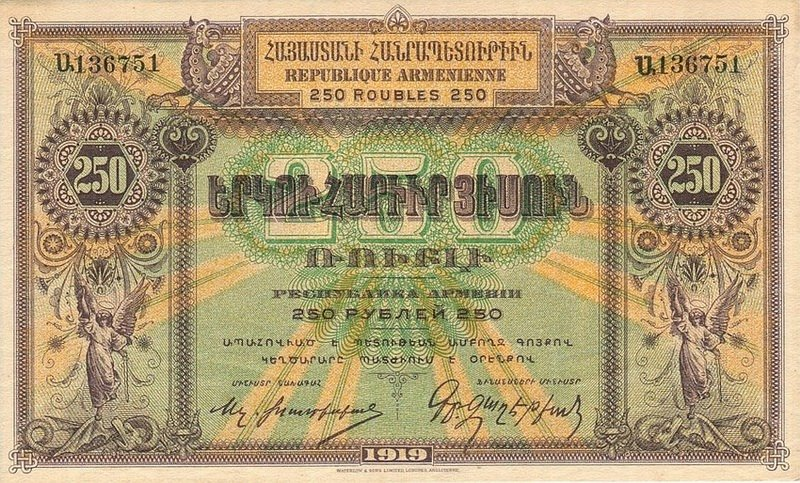

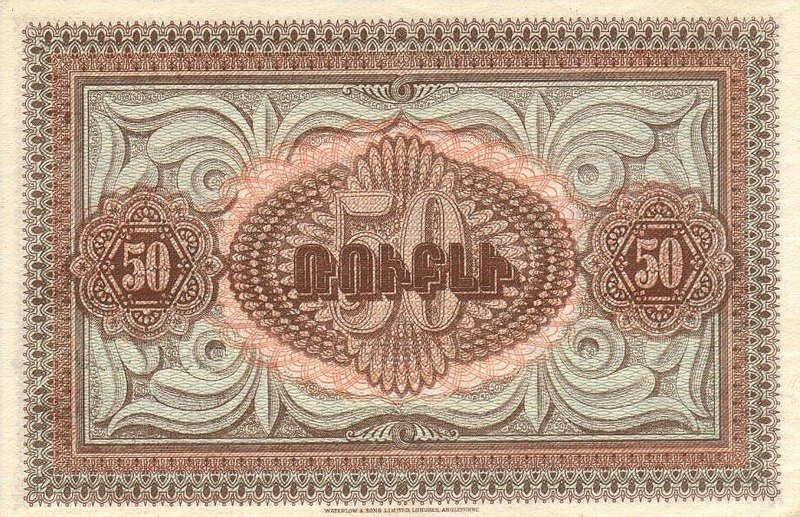
50 ruble 1920(real)

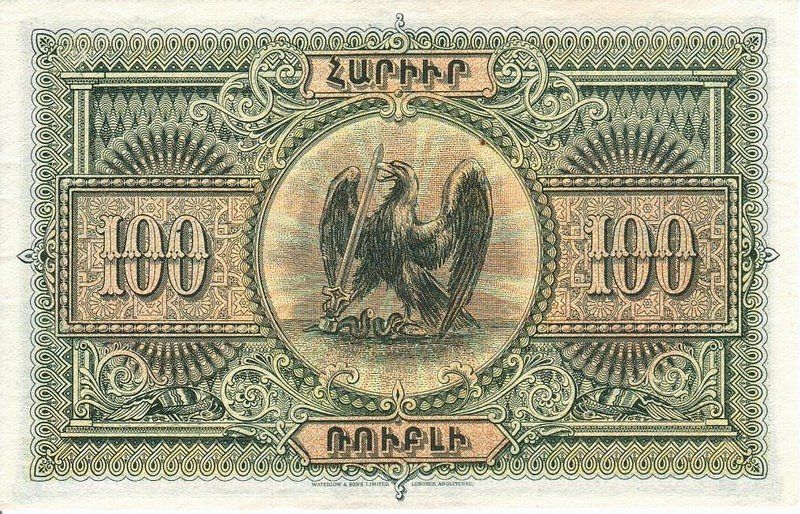
100 ruble 1920(real)

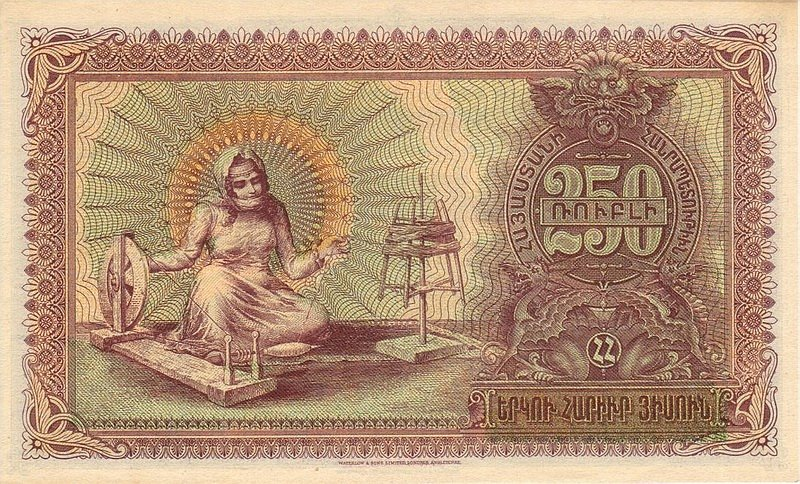
250 ruble 1920(real)

== See also ==
- Armenian dram
