= Transcaucasian ruble =

Currency of the Transcaucasian Soviet Federative Socialist Republic

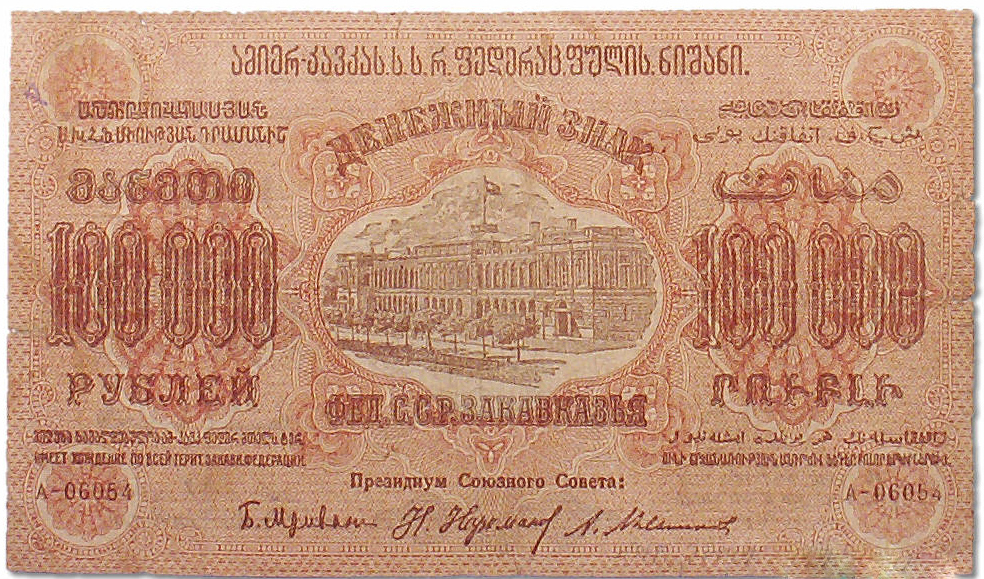

Unit
- Plural: rublya (gen. sing.), rubley (gen. pl.)

Denominations
- Banknotes: 1, 3, 5, 10, 50, 100 and 250 rubles (1918); 1000 ... 10^{10} rubles (1923/24)

Demographics
- Date of withdrawal: 1924
- User(s): Transcaucasian Democratic Federative Republic; Transcaucasian SFSR
- This infobox shows the latest status before this currency was rendered obsolete.

The ruble (Russian: рубль, Armenian: ռուբլի), manat (Azerbaijani: منات) or maneti (Georgian: მანეთი) was the currency of both Transcaucasian states, the Transcaucasian Democratic Federative Republic and the Transcaucasian Soviet Federal Socialist Republic.

== First Transcaucasian ruble ==
In 1918, the Comissariat of the short-lived Transcaucasian Democratic Federative Republic issued paper money denominated in rubles. This ruble was equivalent to the Russian ruble. The notes bore Russian text on the obverse, with Armenian, Azerbaijani, and Georgian texts on the reverse. Denominations were 1, 3, 5, 10, 50, 100 and 250 rubles.

Between 1919 and 1922/3, Armenia, Azerbaijan and Georgia issued their own currencies, the Armenian, Azeri, and Georgian rubles, which replaced the Transcaucasian rubles at par.

== Second Transcaucasian ruble ==
In 1923 and 1924, the Transcaucasian Soviet Federal Socialist Republic (part of the USSR) issued notes of denominations between 1,000 and 10 milliard rubles.

From 1924 and onwards, the Soviet ruble circulated as the official currency of the Transcaucasian SFSR (and the three Soviet Socialist Republics that succeeded the Transcaucasian SFSR). Armenia, Azerbaijan, and Georgia gained independence and issued their own respective currencies in 1993, 1992, and 1993, shortly after the fall of the Soviet Union.

== See also ==
- Armenian dram
- Azerbaijani manat
- Georgian lari
