= Transcaucasian Socialist Federative Soviet Republic =

Soviet republic from 1922 to 1936

Transcaucasian Socialist Federative Soviet Republic: Armenian: Անդրկովկասի Խորհրդային Սոցիալիստական Դաշնային (Ֆեդերատիվ) Հանրապետություն Andrkovkasi Khorhrdayin Soc'ialistakan Dashnayin (Federativ) Hanrapetut'yun; Azerbaijani: Zaqafqaziya Sosialist Federativ Sovet Respublikası زاقافقازیا اجتماعی فدراتیو شورا جمهوریتی; Georgian: ამიერკავკასიის საბჭოთა ფედერაციული სოციალისტური რესპუბლიკა Amierk'avk'asiis Sabch'ota Pederatsiuli Sotsialist'uri Resp'ublik'a; Russian: Закавказская Социалистическая Федеративная Советская Республика Zakavkazskaya Sotsalisticheskaya Federativnaya Sovetskaya Respublika
- 1922–1936
- Flag (1925–1936) Emblem (1930–1936)
- Anthem: Интернационал "The Internationale" (1922–1936)
- Location of the Transcaucasian SFSR (red) within the Soviet Union
- Status: 1922: Condominium state 1922–1936: Union Republic of the Soviet Union
- Capital: Tiflis (Tbilisi)
- Common languages: Armenian; Azerbaijani; Georgian; Russian
- Ethnic groups (1926): 30.7% Georgians; 28.2% Azerbaijanis; 22.7% Armenians; 5.7% Russians; 5.2% Iranian peoples 1.1% Jews; 1.0% Lezgic peoples 1.0% Greeks; 1.0% Abkhazians; 3.4% Others
- Demonym: Transcaucasian
- Government: Federation of communist states (1922); Federal communist state (1922–1936)
- Legislature: All-Caucasian Congress of Soviets
- History
  - Established: 12 March 1922
  - Admitted to the Soviet Union: 30 December 1922
  - Disestablished: 5 December 1936

Area
  - Total: 186,043 km^{2} (71,832 sq mi)
  - Water: 2,785 km^{2} (1,075 sq mi)
  - Water (%): 1.49%
- Currency: Transcaucasian rouble, Soviet rouble
Preceded by
SSR Abkhazia
South Ossetian AO
Armenian SSR
Azerbaijan SSR
Georgian SSR
Succeeded by
Abkhaz ASSR
Nagorno-Karabakh AO
South Ossetian AO
Armenian SSR
Azerbaijan SSR
Georgian SSR
- Today part of: Armenia; Azerbaijan; Georgia; Abkhazia; South Ossetia

The Transcaucasian Socialist Federative Soviet Republic (Transcaucasian SFSR or TSFSR), also known as the Transcaucasian Soviet Federative Socialist Republic, or simply Transcaucasia, was a republic of the Soviet Union that existed from 1922 to 1936.

The TSFSR comprised Armenia, Azerbaijan, and Georgia, traditionally known as the "Transcaucasian Republics" as they were separated from Russia by the Caucasus Mountains. It was created in March 1922 to unify the region following a Soviet invasion two years prior, and was one of the four republics to sign the Treaty on the Creation of the Union of Soviet Socialist Republics establishing the Soviet Union in December 1922. The TSFSR was dissolved upon the adoption of the 1936 Soviet Constitution and its constituent republics were elevated individually to republics of the Soviet Union.

== History ==
The roots of a Transcaucasian condominium state trace back to the dissolution of the Russian Empire in 1918, following the October Revolution, when the provinces of the Caucasus seceded and formed their own state called the Transcaucasian Federation. Competing ethno-national interests and confrontation with the Ottoman Empire in World War I led to the dissolution of the Transcaucasian Federation only two months later, in April 1918. The three successor states—the First Republic of Armenia, the Democratic Republic of Azerbaijan, and the Democratic Republic of Georgia—lasted until 1920, when they were invaded by the Red Army and sovietized during the Armenian–Azerbaijani war. The Armenian, Azerbaijani, and Georgian Soviet Socialist Republics took the place of their respective nations.

Following a proposal by Vladimir Lenin, the three Soviet Republics were united into the Federative Union of Socialist Soviet Republics of Transcaucasia on 12 March 1922. On 13 December that year, the First All-Caucasian Congress of Soviets transformed this federation of states into a unified federal state and renamed it the Transcaucasian Socialist Federative Soviet Republic, though keeping formally the autonomy of its constituent republics. The congress also adopted the constitution, appointed the Central Executive Committee (the highest legislative body between congressional sessions), and the Council of People's Commissars (the government). Mamia Orakhelashvili, a Georgian Bolshevik leader, became the first chairman of the Transcaucasian SFSR's Council of People's Commissars. Tbilisi was the capital of the republic.

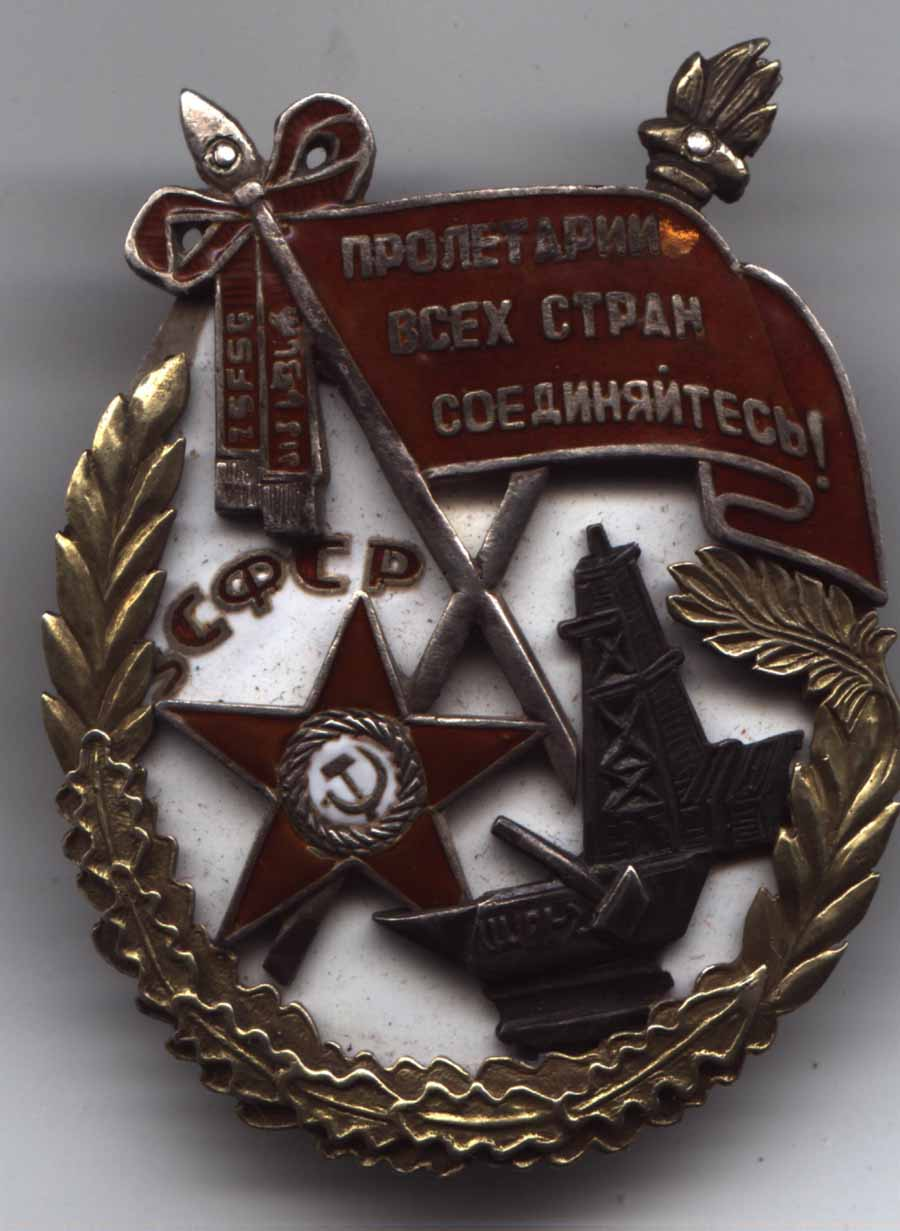
Order of the Red Banner of Labour issued by the Transcaucasian SFSR, with Azerbaijani and Armenian scripts and imagery of a minecart and oil derrick.

The republic became a founding member of the Soviet Union on 30 December along with the Russian SFSR, the Ukrainian SSR, and the Byelorussian SSR. In December 1936, the Transcaucasian SFSR was dissolved and divided again among the Georgian, Armenian, and Azerbaijani SSRs.

== Autonomous republics within the TSFSR ==
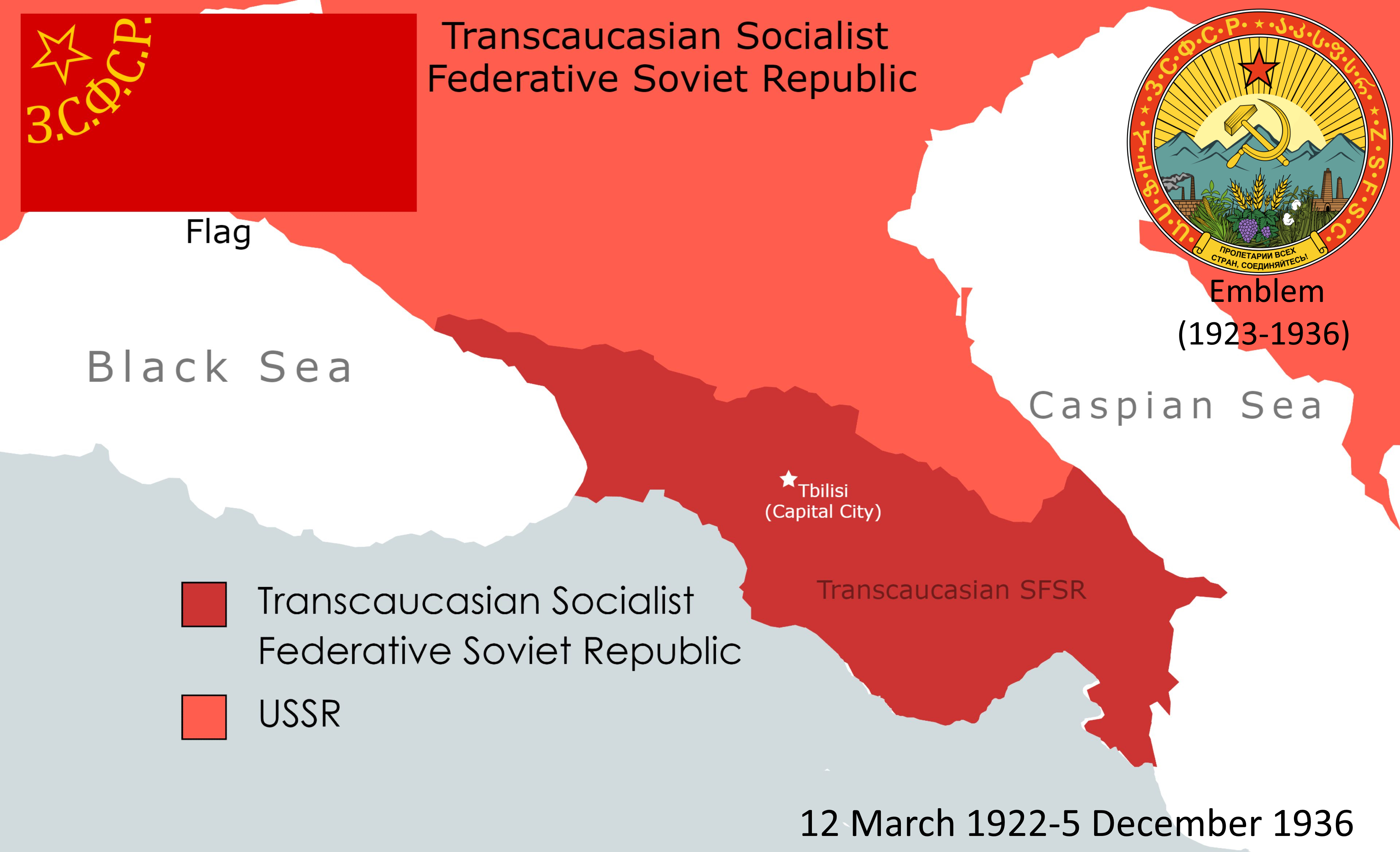
Map of the Transcaucasian region during the Soviet era

After the Red Army invasion of Georgia, Abkhazia (an autonomous province within the Democratic Republic of Georgia) was declared a Soviet Republic. In March 1922, the Abkhaz Revolutionary committee renamed the region the SSR of Abkhazia. Despite the declaration of this new Soviet Republic, its relations with Georgia and Russia had yet to be formally settled. On December 16, 1921, Abkhazia signed a treaty of alliance with the Georgian SSR codifying its status as a treaty republic (Russian: договорная республика). This agreement allowed the formation of an Abkhazia military while also establishing a political and financial union between the two Soviet republics. Thus, through Georgia, Abkhazia joined the TSFSR and was initially on an equal footing with the other republics of the federation. On February 19, 1931, Abkhazia's republican status was changed to that of an Autonomous Soviet Socialist Republic within the Georgian SSR.

The Adjarian ASSR was established on July 16, 1921, within the Georgian SSR as a consequence of the Treaty of Kars. The treaty marking the end of the Caucasus Campaign in World War I provided for the division of the former Batum Oblast of the Kutais Governorate of the Russian Empire between Georgia and Turkey. According to the agreement the northern half with a significant Georgian Muslim population would become part of the Soviet Georgia but granted autonomy.

Another autonomous republic was established in July 1920 in Nakhchivan, an area bordering Armenia, Turkey, and Iran, which was claimed by Armenians and Azerbaijanis. After the occupation of the region by the Red Army, the Nakhchivan Autonomous Soviet Socialist Republic was declared with "close ties" to the Azerbaijani SSR. The Treaty of Moscow and the Treaty of Kars established the Nakhchivan region as an autonomous republic under the protection of the Soviet Republic of Azerbaijan.

== Heads of state ==
Chairs of the Union Council
Name	Dates	Party
Nariman Narimanov	March–December 1922	Communist Party of Azerbaijan
Polikarp Mdivani	March–December 1922	Communist Party of Georgia
Aleksandr Myasnikyan	March–December 1922	Communist Party of Armenia

Chairmen of the Presidium of the USSR CEC from TSFSR
Name	Dates	Party
Nariman Narimanov	1922–1925	Communist Party of Azerbaijan
Gazanfar Musabekov	1925–1938	Communist Party of Azerbaijan

Chairs of the Central Executive Committee
Name	Period	For
Mikhail Tskhakaya (1st time)	1922–1927	Georgia
Samad aga Aliyev	1922–1929	Azerbaijan
Sarkis Hambartsumyan	1922–1925	Armenia
Sarkis Kasyan	1927–1931	Armenia
Filipp Makharadze (1st time)	1927–1928	Georgia
Mikhail Tskhakaya (2nd time)	1928–1931	Georgia
Gazanfar Musabekov	1929–1931	Azerbaijan
Filipp Makharadze (2nd time)	1931–1935	Georgia
Armenak Ananyan	1931–1935	Armenia
Sultan Majid Afandiyev	1931–1936	Azerbaijan
Sergo Martikyan	1935–1936	Armenia
Avel Enukidze	March–May 1935	Georgia
Filipp Makharadze (3rd time)	1935–1936	Georgia

== Stamps and postal history ==
Before 1923, Georgia, Armenia, and Azerbaijan each issued their own postage stamps. The Transcaucasian Federation began issuing its own stamps on September 15, 1923, and superseded the separate republics' issues on October 1.

The first issues consisted of some of the stamps of Russia and Armenia overprinted with a star containing the five-letter acronym of the Federation inside the points. Massive inflation having set in, this was followed by an issue of the Federation's own designs, four values of a view of oil fields, and four with a montage of Soviet symbols over mountains and oil derricks, values ranging from 40,000 to 500,000 Transcaucasian rubles. The 40,000 rubles and 75,000 rubles were then surcharged to 700,000 rubles. On October 24, the stamps were re-issued with values from 1 to 18 gold kopecks. Starting in 1924, the Federation used stamps of the Soviet Union.

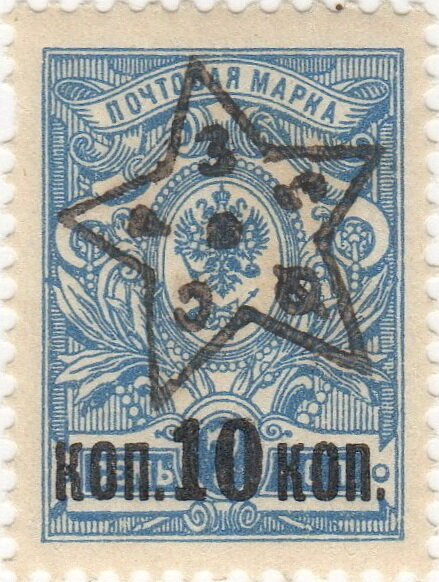
A 1923 stamp overprinted on the stamp of the Russian Empire

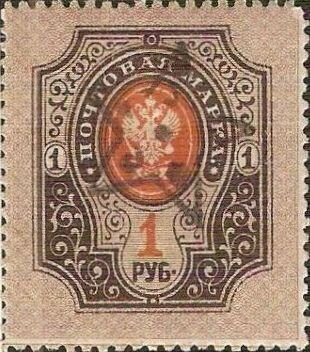
A 1923 stamp overprinted on the stamp of the Democratic Republic of Armenia

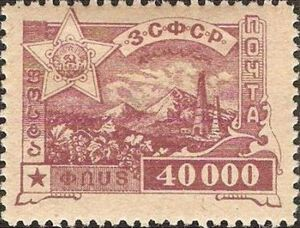
1923 40,000-rouble stamp

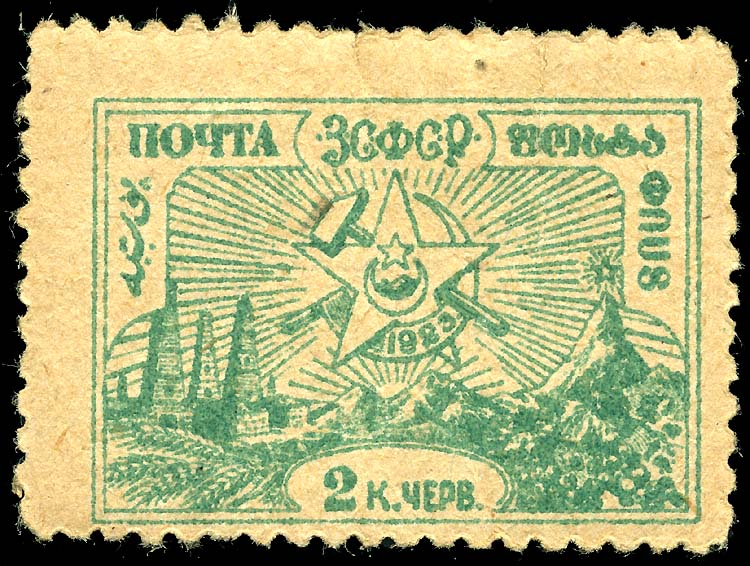
1923 two-kopeck stamp

Most of the stamps of the Federation are not especially rare today, with 1998 prices in the US$1–2 range, although the overprints on Armenian stamps range up to US$200. As might be expected from a short period of usage, used stamps are less common than unused and covers are not often seen.

== See also ==
- Kars Republic
- Mountain Autonomous Soviet Socialist Republic
- Lithuanian–Belorussian Soviet Socialist Republic
- Far Eastern Republic
- Don Republic
- Kuban People's Republic
- Bavarian Soviet Republic
- Republics of the Soviet Union
- Komancza Republic

== Bibliography ==
- Blauvelt, Timothy (May 2007), "Abkhazia: Patronage and Power in the Stalin Era", Nationalities Papers, 35 (2): 203–232, doi:10.1080/00905990701254318, S2CID 128803263
- Forestier-Peyrat, Etienne (January 2018), "Soviet Federalism at Work: Lessons from the History of the Transcaucasian Federation, 1922–1936", Jahrbücher für Geschichte Osteuropas, 65 (4): 529–559, doi:10.25162/jgo-2017-0020, S2CID 252457317
- Hewitt, B.G. (1993), "Abkhazia: a problem of identity and ownership", Central Asian Survey, 12 (3): 267–323, doi:10.1080/02634939308400819
- Lang, David Marshall (1962), A History of Modern Georgia, London: Weidenfeld and Nicolson
- Saparov, Arsène (2015), From Conflict to Autonomy in the Caucasus: The Soviet Union and the making of Abkhazia, South Ossetia and Nagorno Karabakh, New York City: Routledge, ISBN 978-0-41-565802-7
- Suny, Ronald Grigor (1994), The Making of the Georgian Nation (Second ed.), Bloomington, Indiana: Indiana University Press
