= Rosewood massacre =

1923 massacre of African Americans in Florida, US

- Part of mass racial violence in the United States and the nadir of American race relations
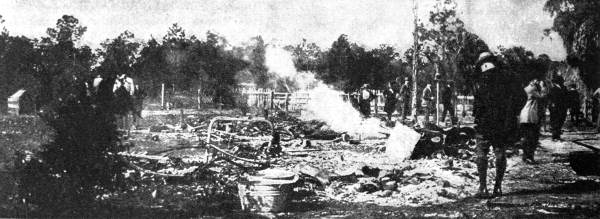
- The remains of Sarah Carrier's house, where two Black and two White people were killed in Rosewood, Florida in January 1923

- Location: 29°14′0″N 82°56′0″W; Levy County, Florida, U.S.
- Date: January 1–7, 1923
- Target: African Americans
- Deaths: 6 Black and 2 White people (official figure); 27 to 150 in some reports
- Injuries: Unknown

The Rosewood massacre was a racially motivated massacre of Black people and the destruction of a Black town during the first week of January 1923 in rural Levy County, Florida. By the official death toll, at least six Black people were killed, but eyewitness accounts suggested 27 or more deaths. In addition, at least two White people were killed in self-defense by one of the victims. The town of Rosewood was destroyed in what contemporary news reports characterized as a race riot.

Florida had especially frequent lynchings of Black men in the years before the massacre, including the lynching of Charles Strong and the Perry massacre in 1922. Before the massacre, the town of Rosewood had been a quiet, primarily Black, self-sufficient whistle stop on the Seaboard Air Line Railway. The rioting began when White men from several nearby towns lynched a Black Rosewood man after accusations that a white woman in nearby Sumner had been assaulted by a Black drifter. Subsequently, a mob of several hundred White men combed the countryside hunting for Black people and descended on Rosewood, burning almost every structure. For several days, survivors from the town hid in nearby swamps until they were evacuated to larger towns by train and car. No arrests were made for the murders, assaults, and arson. The town was abandoned by its former Black and White residents and ceased to exist.

Although the rioting was widely reported around the United States at the time, few official records documented it. The survivors, their descendants, and the perpetrators all remained silent for decades. Sixty years later, the story of Rosewood was revived by major media when several journalists covered it in the early 1980s. Survivors and their descendants organized to sue the state for failing to protect Rosewood's Black community. In 1993, the Florida Legislature commissioned a report whose findings led to the state compensating survivors and descendants for the damages of racial violence. The incident was the subject of a 1997 feature film directed by John Singleton. In 2004, the state designated the site of Rosewood as a Florida Heritage Landmark.

The officially recorded death toll during the first week of January 1923 was eight: six Black and two White. Survivors' stories claim up to 27 Black residents were killed, and they also assert that newspapers did not report all deaths of Whites. Minnie Lee Langley, who was in the besieged Carrier house, recalls stepping over many White bodies on the porch when she left. A 1984 newspaper article was skeptical of estimates of up to 150 victims. Several eyewitnesses claim to have seen a mass grave filled with the bodies of Black victims; one witness remembers seeing 26 bodies being covered with a plow brought from Cedar Key. However, by the time authorities investigated these claims, most of the witnesses had died or were too infirm to identify the mass burial site.

== Background ==
=== Settlement ===
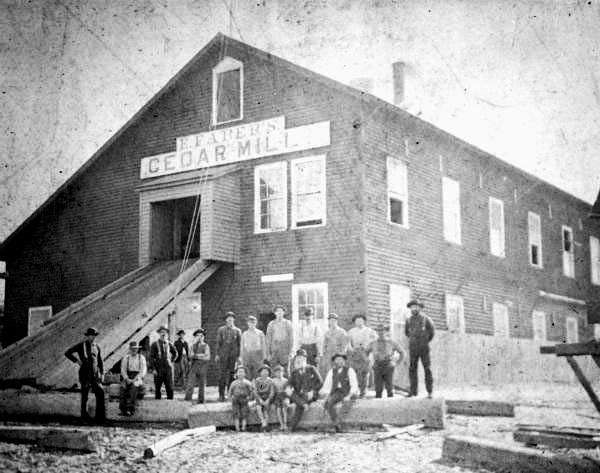
This pencil mill in Cedar Key was an integral part of local industry.

Rosewood was settled in 1847, nine miles (14 km) east of Cedar Key, near the Gulf of Mexico. Most of the local economy drew on the timber industry; the name Rosewood refers to the reddish color of cut cedar wood. Two pencil mills were founded nearby in Cedar Key; local residents also worked in several turpentine mills and a sawmill three miles (4.8 km) away in Sumner, in addition to farming of citrus and cotton. The hamlet grew enough to warrant the construction of a post office and train depot on the Florida Railroad in 1870, but it was never incorporated as a town.

Initially, Rosewood had both Black and White settlers. When most of the cedar trees in the area had been cut by 1890, the pencil mills closed, and many White residents moved to Sumner. By 1900, the population in Rosewood had become predominantly Black. The village of Sumner was predominantly White, and relations between the two communities were relatively amicable. Two Black families in Rosewood named Goins and Carrier were the most powerful. The Goins family brought the turpentine industry to the area, and in the years preceding the attacks were the second largest landowners in Levy County. To avoid lawsuits from white competitors, the Goins brothers moved to Gainesville, and the population of Rosewood decreased slightly. The Carriers were also a large family, primarily working at logging in the region. By the 1920s, almost everyone in the close-knit community was distantly related to each other. The population of Rosewood peaked in 1915 at 355 people. Florida had effectively disenfranchised Black voters since the start of the 20th century by high requirements for voter registration; both Sumner and Rosewood were part of a single voting precinct counted by the U.S. census. In 1920, the combined population of both towns was 638 (344 Black and 294 White).

As was common in the late 19th century South, Florida had imposed legal racial segregation under Jim Crow laws requiring separate Black and White public facilities and transportation. Black and White residents created their own community centers: by 1920, the residents of Rosewood were mostly self-sufficient. They had three churches, a school, a large Masonic Hall, a turpentine mill, a sugarcane mill, a baseball team named the Rosewood Stars, and two general stores, one of which was White-owned. The village had about a dozen two-story wooden plank homes, other small two-room houses, and several small unoccupied plank farm and storage structures. Some families owned pianos, organs, and other symbols of middle-class prosperity. Survivors of Rosewood remember it as a happy place. In 1995, survivor Robie Mortin recalled at age 79 that when she was a child there, that "Rosewood was a town where everyone's house was painted. There were roses everywhere you walked. Lovely."

=== Racial tensions in Florida ===
Racial violence at the time was common throughout the nation, manifested as individual incidents of extra-legal actions, or attacks on entire communities. Lynchings reached a peak around the start of the 20th century as southern states were disenfranchising black voters and imposing white supremacy; white supremacists used it as a means of social control throughout the South. In 1866 Florida, as did many Southern states, passed laws called Black Codes disenfranchising Black citizens. Although these were quickly overturned, and black citizens enjoyed a brief period of improved social standing, by the late 19th century Black political influence was virtually nil. The white Democratic-dominated legislature passed a poll tax in 1885, which largely served to disenfranchise all poor voters. Losing political power, Black voters suffered a deterioration of their legal and political rights in the years following. Without the right to vote, they were excluded as jurors and could not run for office, effectively excluding them from the political process. The United States as a whole was experiencing rapid social changes: an influx of European immigrants, industrialization and the growth of cities, and political experimentation in the North. In the South, Black Americans grew increasingly dissatisfied with their lack of economic opportunity and status as second-class citizens.

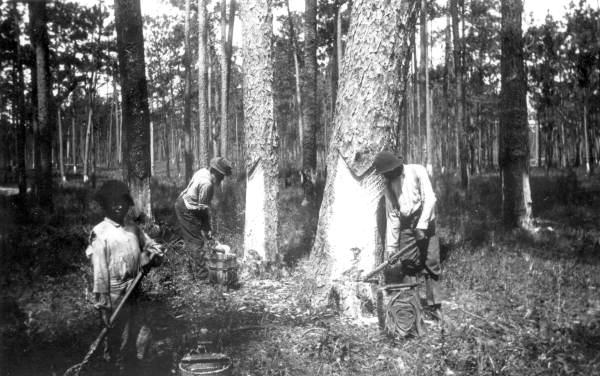
Black turpentine workers were encouraged to stay in Florida only after they became scarce.

Elected officials in Florida represented the voting White majority. Governor Napoleon Bonaparte Broward (1905–1909) suggested finding a location out of state for Black people to live separately. Tens of thousands of people moved to the North during and after World War I in the Great Migration, unsettling labor markets and introducing more rapid changes into cities. They were recruited by many expanding northern industries, such as the Pennsylvania Railroad, the steel industry, and meatpacking. Florida governors Park Trammell (1913–1917) and Sidney Catts (1917–1921) generally ignored the emigration of Blacks to the North and its causes. While Trammell was state attorney general, none of the 29 lynchings committed during his term were prosecuted, nor were any of the 21 that occurred while he was governor. Catts ran on a platform of white supremacy and anti-Catholic sentiment; he openly criticized the National Association for the Advancement of Colored People (NAACP) when they complained he did nothing to investigate two lynchings in Florida. Catts changed his message when the turpentine and lumber industries claimed labor was scarce; he began to plead with Black workers to stay in the state. By 1940, 40,000 black people had left Florida to find employment, but also to escape the oppression of segregation, underfunded education and facilities, violence, and disenfranchisement.

When U.S. troop training began for World War I, many White Southerners were alarmed at the thought of arming Black soldiers. A confrontation regarding the rights of black soldiers culminated in the Houston Riot of 1917. German propaganda encouraged Black soldiers to turn against their "real" enemies: American Whites. Rumors reached the U.S. that French women had been sexually active with Black American soldiers, which University of Florida historian David Colburn argues struck at the heart of Southern fears about power and miscegenation. Colburn connects growing concerns of sexual intimacy between the races to what occurred in Rosewood: "Southern culture had been constructed around a set of mores and values which places White women at its center and in which the purity of their conduct and their manners represented the refinement of that culture. An attack on women not only represented a violation of the South's foremost taboo, but it also threatened to dismantle the very nature of southern society." The transgression of sexual taboos subsequently combined with the arming of black citizens to raise fears among Whites of an impending race war in the South.

The influx of Black people into urban centers in the Northeast and Midwest increased racial tensions in those cities. Between 1917 and 1923, racial disturbances erupted in numerous cities throughout the U.S., motivated by economic competition between different racial groups for industrial jobs. One of the first and most violent instances was a riot in East St. Louis, sparked in 1917. In the Red Summer of 1919, racially motivated mob violence erupted in 23 cities—including Chicago, Omaha, and Washington, D.C.—caused by competition for jobs and housing by returning World War I veterans of both races, and the arrival of waves of new European immigrants. Further unrest occurred in Tulsa in 1921, when Whites attacked the black Greenwood community. David Colburn distinguishes two types of violence against Black people up to 1923: Northern violence was generally spontaneous mob action against entire communities. Southern violence, in contrast, took the form of individual incidents of lynchings and other extrajudicial actions. The Rosewood massacre, according to Colburn, resembled violence more commonly perpetrated in the North in those years.

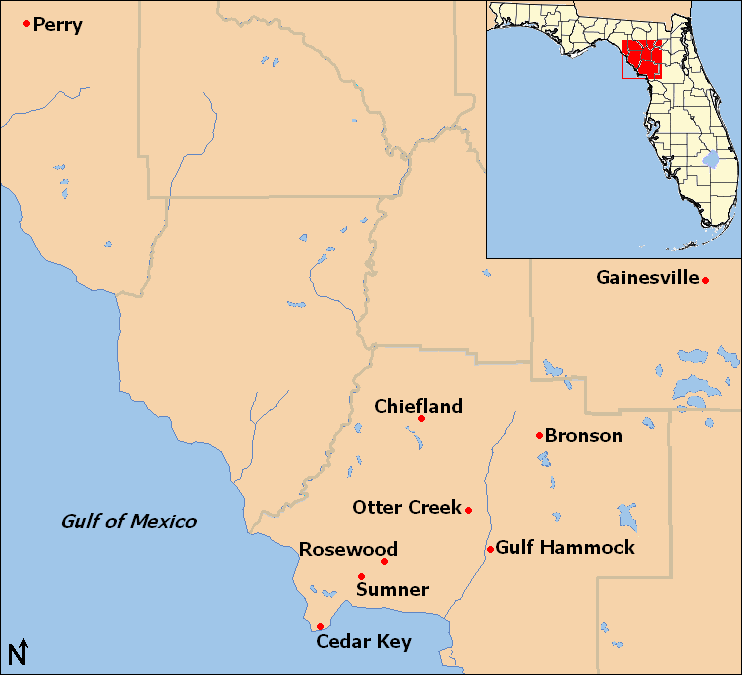
Map of Rosewood, Florida and the surrounding towns

In the mid-1920s, the Ku Klux Klan (KKK) reached its peak membership in the South and Midwest after a revival beginning around 1915. Its growth was due in part to tensions from rapid industrialization and social change in many growing cities; in the Midwest and West, its growth was related to the competition of waves of new immigrants from Southern and Eastern Europe. The KKK was strong in the Florida cities of Jacksonville and Tampa; Miami's chapter was influential enough to hold initiations at the Miami Country Club. The Klan also flourished in smaller towns of the South where racial violence had a long tradition dating back to the Reconstruction era. An editor of The Gainesville Daily Sun admitted that he was a member of the Klan in 1922, and praised the organization in print.

Despite Governor Catts' change of attitude, White mob action frequently occurred in towns throughout north and central Florida and went unchecked by local law enforcement. Extrajudicial violence against Black residents was so common that it seldom was covered by newspapers. In 1920, Whites removed four Black men from jail, who were suspects accused of raping a White woman in Macclenny, and lynched them. In Ocoee the same year, two Black citizens armed themselves to go to the polls during an election. A confrontation ensued and two White election officials were shot, after which a White mob destroyed Ocoee's Black community, causing as many as 30 deaths, and destroying 25 homes, two churches, and a Masonic Lodge. Just weeks before the Rosewood massacre, the Perry massacre occurred on December 14 and 15, 1922, in which Whites burned Charles Wright at the stake and attacked the Black community of Perry, Florida after a White schoolteacher was murdered. On the day following Wright's lynching, Whites shot and hanged two more Black men in Perry; next they burned the town's Black school, Masonic lodge, church, amusement hall, and several families' homes.

== Events in Rosewood ==
=== Fannie Taylor's story ===
The Rosewood massacre occurred after a White woman in Sumner claimed she had been assaulted by a black man. Frances "Fannie" Taylor was 22 years old in 1923 and married to James, a 30-year-old millwright employed by Cummer & Sons in Sumner. They lived there with their two young children. James' job required him to leave each day during the darkness of early morning. Neighbors remembered Fannie Taylor as "very peculiar": she was meticulously clean, scrubbing her cedar floors with bleach so that they shone white. Other women attested that Taylor was aloof; no one knew her very well.

On January 1, 1923, the Taylors' neighbor reported that she heard a scream while it was still dark, grabbed her revolver and ran next door to find Fannie bruised and beaten, with scuff marks across the white floor. Taylor was screaming that someone needed to get her baby. She said a Black man was in her house; he had come through the back door and assaulted her. The neighbor found the baby, but no one else. Taylor's initial report stated her assailant beat her about the face but did not rape her. Rumors circulated—widely believed by whites in Sumner—that she was both raped and robbed. (Note: The story was disputed for years: historian Thomas Dye interviewed a White man in Sumner in 1993 who asserted, "that nigger raped her!" (Thomas Dye in The Historian, 1996). Ernest Parham, who married W. H. Pillsbury's daughter three years after Pillsbury's death in 1926, was skeptical that Taylor was raped, based on his personal knowledge of James Taylor: "They came from a good Cedar Key family. At least he did. Where she came from, I don't know. But some of James Taylor's sisters were in my class in school. I knew that family, and they were good people." (D'Orso, p. 198.)) The charge of rape of a White woman by a Black man was inflammatory in the South: the day before, the Klan had held a parade and rally of over 100 hooded Klansmen 50 miles (80 km) away in Gainesville under a burning cross and a banner reading, "First and Always Protect Womanhood".

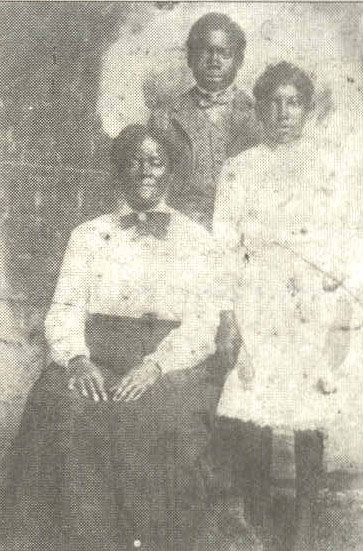
Sarah Carrier (left), Sylvester Carrier (standing) and his sister Willie Carrier (right), taken around 1910

The neighbor also reported the absence that day of Taylor's laundress, Sarah Carrier, whom the White women in Sumner called "Aunt Sarah". Philomena Goins, Carrier's granddaughter, told a different story about Fannie Taylor many years later. She joined her grandmother Carrier at Taylor's home as usual that morning. They watched a white man leave by the back door later in the morning before noon. She said Taylor did emerge from her home showing evidence of having been beaten, but it was well after morning. Carrier's grandson and Philomena's brother, Arnett Goins, sometimes went with them; he had seen the white man before. Carrier told others in the Black community what she had seen that day; the Black community of Rosewood believed that Fannie Taylor had a White lover, they got into a fight that day, and he beat her. When the man left Taylor's house, he went to Rosewood.

Quickly, Levy County Sheriff Robert Elias Walker raised a posse and started an investigation. When they learned that Jesse Hunter, a black prisoner, had escaped from a chain gang, they began a search to question him about Taylor's attack. Men arrived from Cedar Key, Otter Creek, Chiefland, and Bronson to help with the search. Adding confusion to the events recounted later, as many as 400 White men began to gather. Sheriff Walker deputized some of them, but was unable to initiate them all. Walker asked for dogs from a nearby convict camp, but one dog may have been used by a group of men acting without Walker's authority. Dogs led a group of about 100 to 150 men to the home of Aaron Carrier, Sarah's nephew. Aaron was taken outside, where his mother begged the men not to kill him. He was tied to a car and dragged to Sumner. Sheriff Walker put Carrier in protective custody at the county seat in Bronson to remove him from the men in the posse, many of whom were drinking and acting on their own authority. Worried that the group would quickly grow further out of control, Walker also urged black employees to stay at the turpentine mills for their own safety.

A group of White vigilantes, who had become a mob by this time, seized Sam Carter, a local blacksmith and teamster who worked in a turpentine still. They tortured Carter into admitting that he had hidden the escaped chain gang prisoner. Carter led the group to the spot in the woods where he said he had taken Hunter, but the dogs were unable to pick up a scent. To the surprise of many witnesses, someone fatally shot Carter in the face. (Note: Ernest Parham, a high school student in Cedar Key at the time, told David Colburn, "You could hear the gasps. I think most everyone was shocked. Mr. Pillsbury, he was standing there, and he said, 'Oh my God, now we'll never know who did it.' And then everybody dispersed, just turned and left. They was all really upset with this fella that did the killing. He was not very well thought of, not then, not for years thereafter, for that matter." (D'Orso, p. 194.)) The group hung Carter's mutilated body from a tree as a symbol to other Black men in the area. Some in the mob took souvenirs of his clothes. Survivors suggest that Taylor's lover fled to Rosewood because he knew he was in trouble and had gone to the home of Aaron Carrier, a fellow veteran and Mason. Carrier and Carter, another Mason, covered the fugitive in the back of a wagon. Carter took him to a nearby river, let him out of the wagon, then returned home to be met by the mob, who was led by dogs following the fugitive's scent.

After lynching Sam Carter, the mob met Sylvester Carrier—Aaron's cousin and Sarah's son—on a road and told him to get out of town. Carrier refused, and when the mob moved on, he suggested gathering as many people as possible for protection.

=== Escalation ===
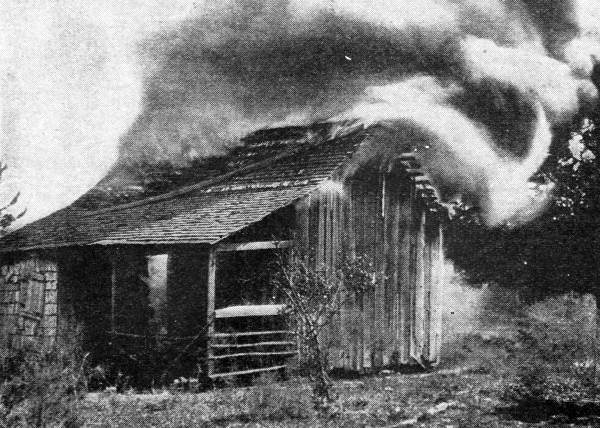
A cabin burns in Rosewood on January 4, 1923 (Note: The image was originally published in a news magazine in 1923, referring to the destruction of the town. Its veracity is somewhat disputed. Eva Jenkins, a Rosewood survivor, testified that she knew of no such structure in the town, that it was perhaps an outhouse. Rosewood houses were painted and most of them neat. However, the Florida Archives lists the image as representing the burning of a structure in Rosewood. (D'Orso, pp. 238–239) (Florida Memory Archives Call No. RC12409.))

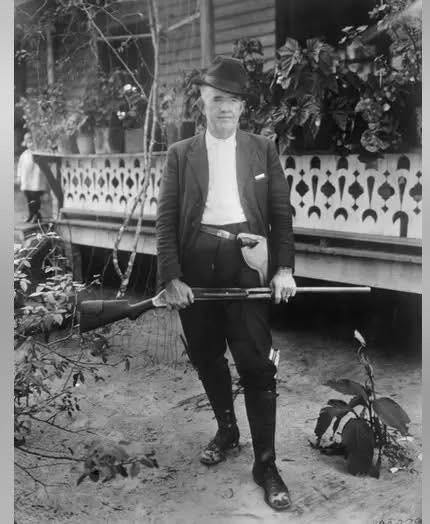
Sheriff Robert Elias Walker holding Sylvester Carrier's shotgun

Despite the efforts of Sheriff Walker and mill supervisor W. H. Pillsbury to disperse the mobs, white men continued to gather. On the evening of January 4, a mob of armed white men went to Rosewood and surrounded the house of Sarah Carrier. It was filled with approximately 15 to 25 people seeking refuge, including many children hiding upstairs under mattresses. Some of the children were in the house because they were visiting their grandmother for Christmas. They were protected by Sylvester Carrier and possibly two other men, but Carrier may have been the only one armed. He had a reputation of being proud and independent. In Rosewood, he was a formidable character, a crack shot, expert hunter, and music teacher, who was simply called "Man". Many White people considered him arrogant and disrespectful.

Sylvester Carrier was reported in the New York Times saying that the attack on Fannie Taylor was an "example of what negroes could do without interference". Whether or not he said this is debated, but a group of 20 to 30 white men, inflamed by the reported statement, went to the Carrier house. They believed that the Black community in Rosewood was hiding escaped prisoner Jesse Hunter. (Note: Cedar Key resident Jason McElveen, who was in the posse that killed Sam Carter, remarked years later, "He said that they had 'em, and that if we thought we could, to come get 'em. That be just like throwing gasoline on fire ... to tell a bunch of White people that." (Thomas Dye in The Historian, 1996) Both Sylvester Carrier and Sam Carter had been previously arrested; Carrier for changing brands on cattle, and Carter for brandishing a shotgun at a sheriff's deputy. Carter had been released before being indicted, and Carrier, convinced that he was wrongly arrested and the charges were brought about by whites competing for grazing lands, was forced to serve on a chain gang for the summer of 1918, which he deeply resented. (Jones et al., "Incident at Rosewood", p. 30)(D'Orso, p. 104) Carrier's demeanor was vastly different from other Black residents of Levy County. He was known to confront White people whom his younger sisters claimed had been rude to them, and made clear that they would have to deal with him in the future. (Jones, et al. "Appendices", pp. 215–216.) Arnett Doctor said that the story about Taylor being raped arose during the three-day span between the death of Sam Carter and the standoff at the Carrier house (Jones et al., "Appendices", p. 150.) Carrier's wife was of mixed ancestry and so light skinned she could pass for white. All these elements, according to Doctor, made Sylvester Carrier a target. (Jones, et al., "Appendices", p. 162.))

Reports conflict about who shot first, but after two members of the mob approached the house, someone opened fire. Sarah Carrier was shot in the head. Her nine-year-old niece at the house, Minnie Lee Langley, had witnessed Aaron Carrier taken from his house three days earlier. When Langley heard someone had been shot, she went downstairs to find her grandmother, Emma Carrier. Sylvester placed Minnie Lee in a firewood closet in front of him as he watched the front door, using the closet for cover: "He got behind me in the wood [bin], and he put the gun on my shoulder, and them crackers was still shooting and going on. He put his gun on my shoulder ... told me to lean this way, and then Poly Wilkerson, he kicked the door down. When he kicked the door down, Cuz' Syl let him have it."

Several shots were exchanged: the house was riddled with bullets, but the Whites did not capture it. The standoff lasted long into the next morning, when Sarah and Sylvester Carrier were found dead inside the house; several others were wounded, including a child who had been shot in the eye. Two white men, C. P. "Poly" Wilkerson and Henry Andrews, were killed; Wilkerson had kicked in the front door, and Andrews was behind him. At least four White men were wounded, one possibly fatally. (Note: Arnett Doctor, in his interview for the report given to the Florida Board of Regents, claimed that his mother received Christmas cards from Sylvester Carrier until 1964; he was said to have been smuggled out of Rosewood in a coffin and later lived in Texas and Louisiana. His survival was not otherwise documented. (Jones et al., "Appendices", pp. 165–166.)) The remaining children in the Carrier house were spirited out the back door into the woods. They crossed dirt roads one at a time, then hid under brush until they had all gathered away from Rosewood.

=== Razing Rosewood ===
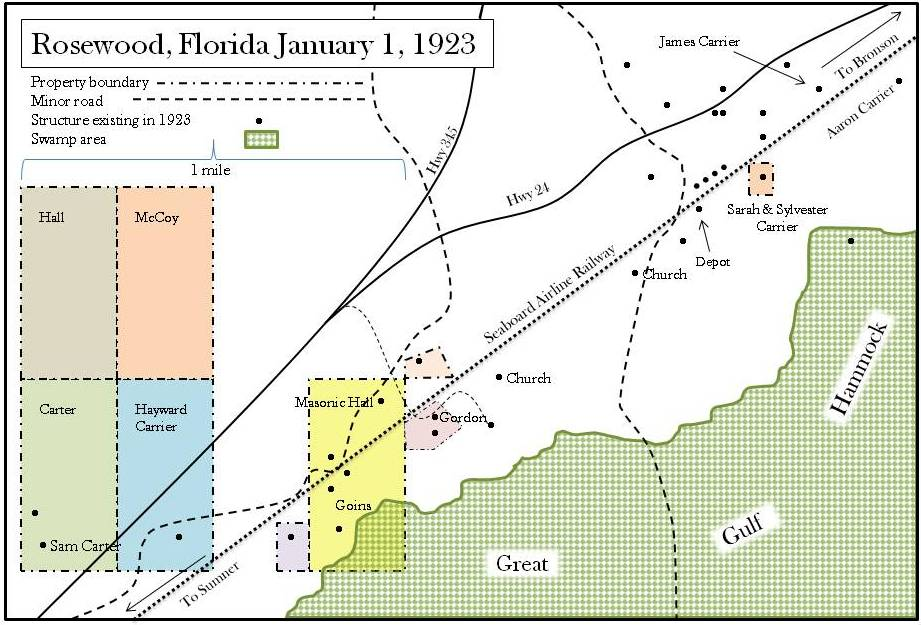

News of the armed standoff at the Carrier house attracted white men from all over the state to take part. Reports were carried in the St. Petersburg Independent, the Florida Times-Union, the Miami Herald, and The Miami Metropolis, in versions of competing facts and overstatement. The Miami Metropolis listed 20 black people and four white people dead and characterized the event as a "race war". National newspapers also put the incident on the front page. The Washington Post and St. Louis Dispatch described a band of "heavily armed Negroes" and a "negro desperado" as being involved. Most of the information came from discreet messages from Sheriff Walker, mob rumors, and other embellishments to part-time reporters who wired their stories to the Associated Press. Details about the armed standoff were particularly explosive. According to historian Thomas Dye, "The idea that blacks in Rosewood had taken up arms against the white race was unthinkable in the Deep South".

Black newspapers covered the events from a different angle. The Afro-American in Baltimore highlighted the acts of African-American heroism against the onslaught of "savages". Another newspaper reported: "Two Negro women were attacked and raped between Rosewood and Sumner. The sexual lust of the brutal white mobbists satisfied, the women were strangled."

The White mob burned Black churches in Rosewood. Philomena Goins' cousin, Lee Ruth Davis, heard the bells tolling in the church as the men were inside setting it on fire. The mob also destroyed the White church in Rosewood. Many Black residents fled for safety into the nearby swamps, some clothed only in their pajamas. Wilson Hall was nine years old at the time; he later recounted his mother waking him to escape into the swamps early in the morning when it was still dark; the lights from approaching cars of White men could be seen for miles. The Hall family walked 15 miles (24 km) through swampland to the town of Gulf Hammock. The survivors recall that it was uncharacteristically cold for Florida, and people suffered when they spent several nights in raised wooded areas called hammocks to evade the mob. Some took refuge with sympathetic white families. Sam Carter's 69-year-old widow hid for two days in the swamps, then was driven by a sympathetic white mail carrier, under bags of mail, to join her family in Chiefland.

White men began surrounding houses, pouring kerosene on and lighting them, then shooting at those who emerged. Lexie Gordon, a light-skinned 50-year-old woman who was ill with typhoid fever, had sent her children into the woods. She was killed by a shotgun blast to the face when she fled from hiding underneath her home, which had been set on fire by the mob. Fannie Taylor's brother-in-law claimed to be her killer. On January 5, more whites converged on the area, forming a mob of between 200 and 300 people. Some came from out of state. Mingo Williams, who was 20 miles (32 km) away near Bronson, was collecting turpentine sap by the side of the road when a car full of Whites stopped and asked his name. As was custom among many residents of Levy County, both Black and White, Williams used a nickname that was more prominent than his given name; when he gave his nickname of "Lord God", he was shot and killed.

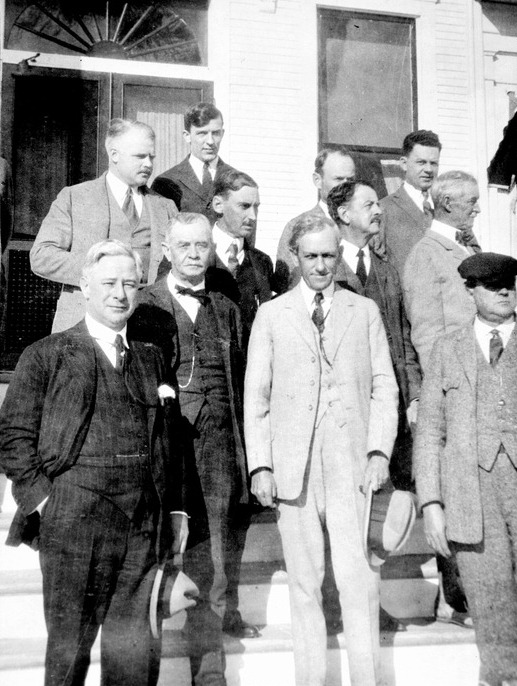
Governor Cary Hardee (center front, in white) took Sheriff Walker's word that all was well, and went on a hunting trip.

Sheriff Walker pleaded with news reporters covering the violence to send a message to the Alachua County Sheriff P. G. Ramsey to send assistance. Carloads of men came from Gainesville to assist Walker; many of them had probably participated in the Klan rally earlier in the week. W. H. Pillsbury tried desperately to keep Black workers in the Sumner mill, and worked with his assistant, a man named Johnson, to dissuade the White workers from joining others using extra-legal violence. Armed guards sent by Sheriff Walker turned away Black people who emerged from the swamps and tried to go home. W. H. Pillsbury's wife secretly helped smuggle people out of the area. Several White men declined to join the mobs, including the town barber who also refused to lend his gun to anyone. He said he did not want his "hands wet with blood".

Governor Cary Hardee was on standby, ready to order National Guard troops in to neutralize the situation. Despite his message to the sheriff of Alachua County, Walker informed Hardee by telegram that he did not fear "further disorder" and urged the governor not to intervene. The governor's office monitored the situation, in part because of intense Northern interest, but Hardee would not activate the National Guard without Walker's request. Walker insisted he could handle the situation; records show that Governor Hardee took Sheriff Walker's word and went on a hunting trip.

James Carrier, Sylvester's brother and Sarah's son, had previously suffered a stroke and was partially paralyzed. He left the swamps and returned to Rosewood. He asked W. H. Pillsbury, the white turpentine mill supervisor, for protection; Pillsbury locked him in a house but the mob found Carrier, and tortured him to find out if he had aided Jesse Hunter, the escaped convict. After they made Carrier dig his own grave, they fatally shot him.

=== Evacuation ===
On January 6, White train conductors John and William Bryce managed the evacuation of some Black residents to Gainesville. The brothers were independently wealthy Cedar Key residents who had an affinity for trains. They knew the people in Rosewood and had traded with them regularly. (Note: William Bryce, known as "K", was unique; he often disregarded race barriers. As a child, he had a Black friend who was killed by a White man who left him to die in a ditch. The man was never prosecuted, and K Bryce said it "clouded his whole life". (Moore, 1982)) As they passed the area, the Bryces slowed their train and blew the horn, picking up women and children. Fearing reprisals from mobs, they refused to pick up any Black men. Many survivors boarded the train after having been hidden by White general store owner John Wright and his wife, Mary Jo. Over the next several days, other Rosewood residents fled to Wright's house, facilitated by Sheriff Walker, who asked Wright to transport as many residents out of town as possible.

Lee Ruth Davis, her sister, and two brothers were hidden by the Wrights while their father hid in the woods. On the morning of Poly Wilkerson's funeral, the Wrights left the children alone to attend. Davis and her siblings crept out of the house to hide with relatives in the nearby town of Wylly, but they were turned back for being too dangerous. The children spent the day in the woods but decided to return to the Wrights' house. After spotting men with guns on their way back, they crept back to the Wrights, who were frantic with fear. Davis later described the experience: "I was laying that deep in water, that is where we sat all day long ... We got on our bellies and crawled. We tried to keep people from seeing us through the bushes ... We were trying to get back to Mr. Wright house. After we got all the way to his house, Mr. and Mrs. Wright were all the way out in the bushes hollering and calling us, and when we answered, they were so glad." Several other white residents of Sumner hid black residents of Rosewood and smuggled them out of town. Gainesville's Black community took in many of Rosewood's evacuees, waiting for them at the train station and greeting survivors as they disembarked, covered in sheets. On Sunday, January 7, a mob of 100 to 150 Whites returned to burn the remaining dozen or so structures of Rosewood.

=== Response ===
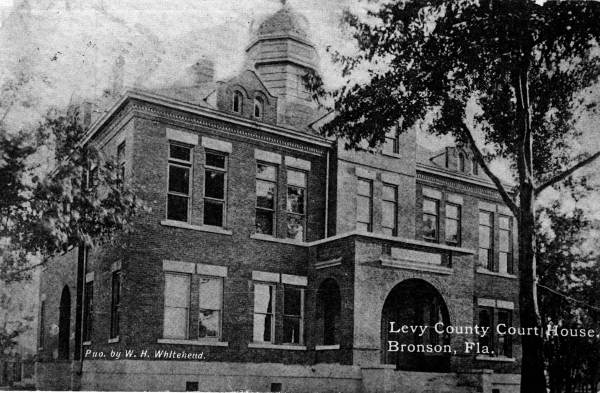
Levy County Courthouse in Bronson, where the governor's grand jury met and found no one to prosecute

Many people were alarmed by the violence, and state leaders feared negative effects on the state's tourist industry. Governor Cary Hardee appointed a special grand jury and special prosecuting attorney to investigate the outbreak in Rosewood and other incidents in Levy County. In February 1923, the all-White grand jury convened in Bronson. Over several days, they heard 25 witnesses, eight of whom were Black, but found insufficient evidence to prosecute any perpetrators. The judge presiding over the case deplored the actions of the mob.

By the end of the week, Rosewood no longer made the front pages of major White newspapers. The Chicago Defender, the most influential Black newspaper in the U.S., reported that 19 people in Rosewood's "race war" had died, and a soldier named Ted Cole appeared to fight the lynch mobs, then disappeared; no confirmation of his existence after this report exists. A few editorials appeared in Florida newspapers summarizing the event. The Gainesville Daily Sun justified the actions of White people involved, writing "Let it be understood now and forever that he, whether white or black, who brutally assaults an innocent and helpless woman, shall die the death of a dog." The Tampa Tribune, in a rare comment on the excesses of whites in the area, called it "a foul and lasting blot on the people of Levy County".

Northern publications were more willing to note the breakdown of law, but many attributed it to the backward mindset in the South. The New York Call, a socialist newspaper, remarked "how astonishingly little cultural progress has been made in some parts of the world", while the Nashville Banner compared the events in Rosewood to recent race riots in Northern cities, but characterized the entire event as "deplorable". A three-day conference in Atlanta organized by the Southern Methodist Church released a statement that similarly condemned the chaotic week in Rosewood. It concluded, "No family and no race rises higher than womanhood. Hence, the intelligence of women must be cultivated and the purity and dignity of womanhood must be protected by the maintenance of a single standard of morals for both races."

Officially, the recorded death toll of the first week of January 1923 was eight people (six black and two white). Historians disagree about this number. Some survivors' stories claim there may have been up to 27 Black residents killed, and assert that newspapers did not report the total number of white deaths. Minnie Lee Langley, who was in the Carrier house siege, recalls that she stepped over many white bodies on the porch when she left the house. Several eyewitnesses claim to have seen a mass grave filled with Black people; one remembers a plow brought from Cedar Key that covered 26 bodies. However, by the time authorities investigated these claims, most of the witnesses were dead, or too elderly and infirm to lead them to a site to confirm the stories.

Aaron Carrier was held in jail for several months in early 1923; he died in 1965. James Carrier's widow Emma was shot in the hand and the wrist and reached Gainesville by train. She never recovered, and died in 1924. Sarah Carrier's husband Haywood did not see the events in Rosewood. He was on a hunting trip, and discovered when he returned that his wife, brother James, and son Sylvester had all been killed and his house destroyed by a White mob. Following the shock of learning what had happened in Rosewood, Haywood rarely spoke to anyone but himself; he sometimes wandered away from his family unclothed. His grandson, Arnett Goins, thought that he had been unhinged by grief. Haywood Carrier died a year after the massacre. Jesse Hunter, the escaped convict, was never found. Many survivors fled in different directions to other cities, and a few changed their names from fear that White people would track them down. None ever returned to live in Rosewood.

Fannie Taylor and her husband moved to another mill town. She was "very nervous" in her later years, until she succumbed to cancer. John Wright's house was the only structure left standing in Rosewood. He lived in it and acted as an emissary between the county and the survivors. After they left the town, almost all of their land was sold for taxes. Mary Jo Wright died around 1931; John developed a problem with alcohol. He was ostracized and taunted for assisting the survivors, and rumored to keep a gun in every room of his house. He died after drinking too much one night in Cedar Key, and was buried in an unmarked grave in Sumner. The sawmill in Sumner burned down in 1925, and the owners moved the operation to Lacoochee in Pasco County. Some survivors as well as participants in the mob action went to Lacoochee to work in the mill there. W. H. Pillsbury was among them, and he was taunted by former Sumner residents. No longer having any supervisory authority, Pillsbury was retired early by the company. He moved to Jacksonville and died in 1926.

== Culture of silence ==
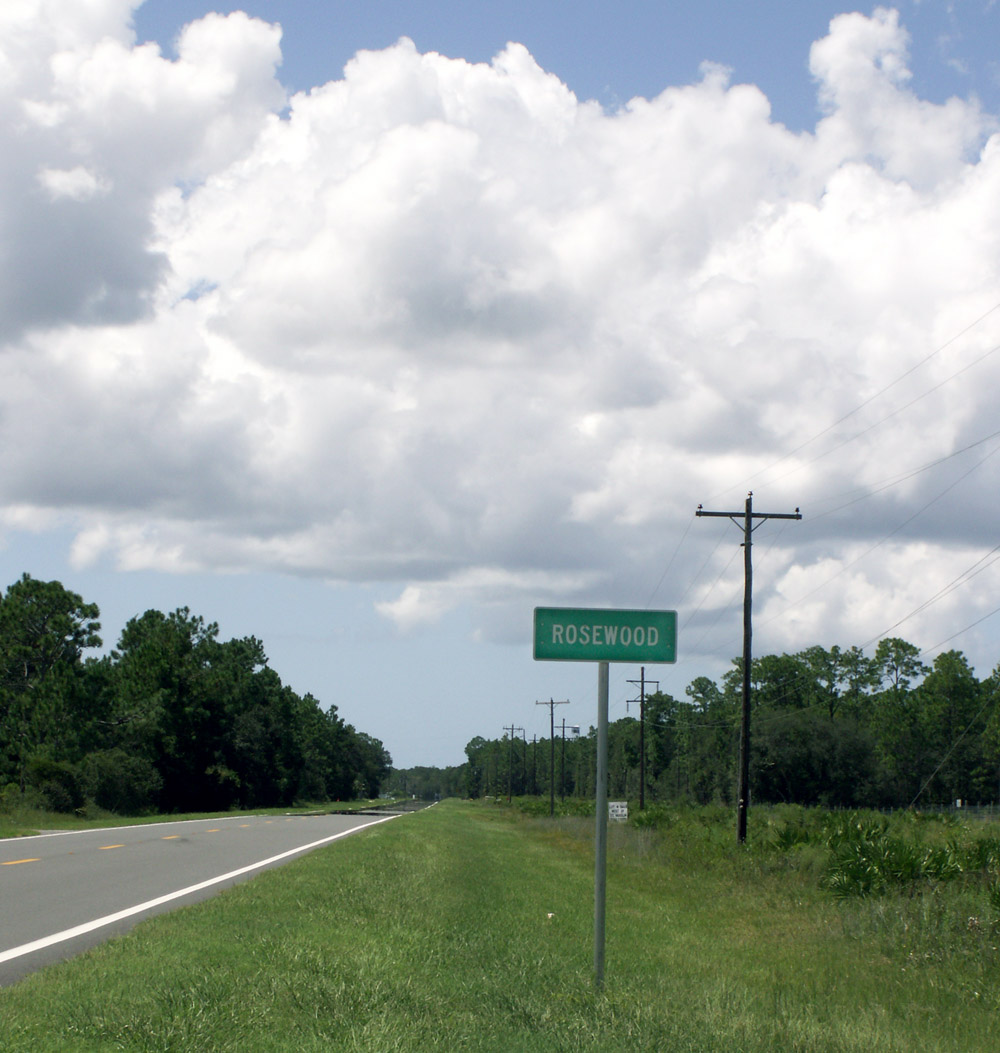
Highway marker for Rosewood, Florida

Despite nationwide news coverage in both White and Black newspapers, the incident, and the small abandoned village, slipped into oblivion. Most of the survivors scattered around Florida cities and started over with nothing. Many, including children, took on odd jobs to make ends meet. Education had to be sacrificed to earn an income. As a result, most of the Rosewood survivors took on manual labor jobs, working as maids, shoe shiners, or in citrus factories or lumber mills.

Although the survivors' experiences after Rosewood were disparate, none publicly acknowledged what had happened. Robie Mortin, Sam Carter's niece, was seven years old when her father put her on a train to Chiefland, 20 miles (32 km) east of Rosewood, on January 3, 1923. Mortin's father avoided the heart of Rosewood on the way to the depot that day, a decision Mortin believes saved their lives. Mortin's father met them years later in Riviera Beach, in South Florida. None of the family ever spoke about the events in Rosewood, on order from Mortin's grandmother: "She felt like maybe if somebody knew where we came from, they might come at us".

This silence was an exception to the practice of oral history among black families. Minnie Lee Langley knew James and Emma Carrier as her parents. She kept the story from her children for 60 years: "I didn't want them to know what I came through and I didn't discuss it with none of them ... I just didn't want them to know what kind of way I come up. I didn't want them to know white folks want us out of our homes." Decades passed before she began to trust white people. Some families spoke of Rosewood, but forbade the stories from being told: Arnett Doctor heard the story from his mother, Philomena Goins Doctor, who was with Sarah Carrier the day Fannie Taylor claimed she was assaulted, and was in the house with Sylvester Carrier. She told her children about Rosewood every Christmas. Doctor was consumed by his mother's story; he would bring it up to his aunts only to be dissuaded from speaking of it.

In 1982, an investigative reporter named Gary Moore from the St. Petersburg Times drove from the Tampa area to Cedar Key looking for a story. When he commented to a local on the "gloomy atmosphere" of Cedar Key, and questioned why a Southern town was all-white when at the start of the 20th century it had been nearly half black, the local woman replied, "I know what you're digging for. You're trying to get me to talk about that massacre." Moore was hooked. He was able to convince Arnett Doctor to join him on a visit to the site, which he did without telling his mother. Moore addressed the disappearance of the incident from written or spoken history: "After a week of sensation, the weeks of January 1923 seem to have dropped completely from Florida's consciousness, like some unmentionable skeleton in the family closet".

When Philomena Goins Doctor found out what her son had done, she became enraged and threatened to disown him, shook him, then slapped him. A year later, Moore took the story to CBS' 60 Minutes, and was the background reporter on a piece produced by Joel Bernstein and narrated by African-American journalist Ed Bradley. Philomena Doctor called her family members and declared Moore's story and Bradley's television exposé were full of lies. A psychologist at the University of Florida later testified in state hearings that the survivors of Rosewood showed signs of posttraumatic stress disorder, made worse by the secrecy. Many years after the incident, they exhibited fear, denial, and hypervigilance about socializing with whites—which they expressed specifically regarding their children, interspersed with bouts of apathy. Despite such characteristics, survivors counted religious faith as integral to their lives following the attack in Rosewood, to keep them from becoming bitter. Michael D'Orso, who wrote a book about Rosewood, said, "[E]veryone told me in their own way, in their own words, that if they allowed themselves to be bitter, to hate, it would have eaten them up." Robie Mortin described her past this way: "I knew that something went very wrong in my life because it took a lot away from me. But I wasn't angry or anything."

The legacy of Rosewood remained in Levy County. For decades no Black residents lived in Cedar Key or Sumner. Robin Raftis, the White editor of the Cedar Key Beacon, tried to place the events in an open forum by printing Moore's story. She had been collecting anecdotes for many years, and said, "Things happened out there in the woods. There's no doubt about that. How bad? We don't know;... So I said, 'Okay guys, I'm opening the closet with the skeletons, because if we don't learn from mistakes, we're doomed to repeat them'." Raftis received notes reading, "We know how to get you and your kids. All it takes is a match". University of Florida historian David Colburn stated, "There is a pattern of denial with the residents and their relatives about what took place, and in fact they said to us on several occasions they don't want to talk about it, they don't want to identify anyone involved, and there's also a tendency to say that those who were involved were from elsewhere."

In 1993, a Black couple retired to Rosewood from Washington D.C. They told The Washington Post, "When we used to have Black friends down from Chiefland, they always wanted to leave before it got dark. They didn't want to be in Rosewood after dark. We always asked, but folks wouldn't say why."

== Seeking justice ==
=== History includes Rosewood ===
Philomena Goins Doctor died in 1991. Her son Arnett was, by that time, "obsessed" with the events in Rosewood. Although he was originally excluded from the Rosewood claims case, he was included after this was revealed by publicity. By that point, the case had been taken on a pro bono basis by one of Florida's largest legal firms Holland & Knight. Attorney Stephen Hanlon brought on lawyer Martha Barnett who he credits for successfully changing the minds of the Florida state legislature, which had been thought of as an impossible task. In 1993, the firm filed a lawsuit on behalf of Arnett Goins, Minnie Lee Langley, and other survivors against the state government for its failure to protect them and their families.

Survivors participated in a publicity campaign to expand attention to the case. Langley and Lee Ruth Davis appeared on The Maury Povich Show on Martin Luther King Day in 1993. Gary Moore published another article about Rosewood in the Miami Herald on March 7, 1993; he had to negotiate with the newspaper's editors for about a year to publish it. At first they were skeptical that the incident had taken place, and secondly, reporter Lori Rosza of the Miami Herald had reported on the first stage of what proved in December 1992 to be a deceptive claims case, with most of the survivors excluded. "If something like that really happened, we figured, it would be all over the history books", an editor wrote.

Arnett Doctor told the story of Rosewood to print and television reporters from all over the world. He raised the number of historic residents in Rosewood, as well as the number who died at the Carrier house siege; he exaggerated the town's contemporary importance by comparing it to Atlanta, Georgia as a cultural center. Doctor wanted to keep Rosewood in the news; his accounts were printed with few changes. According to historian Thomas Dye, Doctor's "forceful addresses to groups across the state, including the NAACP, together with his many articulate and heart-rending television appearances, placed intense pressure on the legislature ... to do something about Rosewood". In December 1996, Doctor told a meeting at Jacksonville Beach that 30 women and children had been buried alive at Rosewood, and that his facts had been confirmed by journalist Gary Moore. He was embarrassed to learn that Moore was in the audience. As the Holland & Knight law firm continued the claims case, they represented 13 survivors, people who had lived in Rosewood at the time of the 1923 violence, in the claim to the legislature.

The lawsuit missed the filing deadline of January 1, 1993. The speaker of the Florida House of Representatives commissioned a group to research and provide a report by which the equitable claim bill could be evaluated. It took them nearly a year to do the research, including interviews, and writing. On December 22, 1993, historians from Florida State University, Florida A&M University, and the University of Florida delivered a 100-page report (with 400 pages of attached documentation) on the Rosewood massacre. It was based on available primary documents, and interviews mostly with Black survivors of the incident. Due to the media attention received by residents of Cedar Key and Sumner following filing of the claim by survivors, White participants were discouraged from offering interviews to the historians. The report used a taped description of the events by Jason McElveen, a Cedar Key resident who had since died, and an interview with Ernest Parham, who was in high school in 1923 and happened upon the lynching of Sam Carter. Parham said he had never spoken of the incident because he was never asked. The report was titled "Documented History of the Incident which Occurred at Rosewood, Florida in January 1923". Gary Moore, the investigative journalist who wrote the 1982 story in The St. Petersburg Times that reopened the Rosewood case, criticized demonstrable errors in the report. The commissioned group retracted the most serious of these, without public discussion. They delivered the final report to the Florida Board of Regents and it became part of the legislative record.

=== Rosewood victims v. the State of Florida ===
Florida's consideration of a bill to compensate victims of racial violence was the first by any U.S. state. Opponents argued that the bill set a dangerous precedent and put the onus of paying survivors and descendants on Floridians who had nothing to do with the incident in Rosewood. James Peters, who represented the State of Florida, argued that the statute of limitations applied because the law enforcement officials named in the lawsuit—Sheriff Walker and Governor Hardee—had died many years before. He also called into question the shortcomings of the report: although the historians were instructed not to write it with compensation in mind, they offered conclusions about the actions of Sheriff Walker and Governor Hardee. The report was based on investigations led by historians as opposed to legal experts; they relied in cases on information that was hearsay from witnesses who had since died. Critics thought that some of the report's writers asked leading questions in their interviews.

Even legislators who agreed with the sentiment of the bill asserted that the events in Rosewood were typical of the era. One survivor interviewed by Gary Moore said that to single out Rosewood as an exception, as if the entire world was not a Rosewood, would be "vile". State legislators who supported the bill Democrat Al Lawson and Republican Miguel De Grandy, argued that, unlike Native Americans or slaves who had suffered atrocities at the hands of whites, the residents of Rosewood were tax-paying, self-sufficient citizens who deserved the protection of local and state law enforcement. While mob lynchings of black people around the same time tended to be spontaneous and quickly concluded, the incident at Rosewood was prolonged over a period of several days. Some legislators began to receive hate mail, including some claiming to be from Ku Klux Klan members. One legislator remarked that his office received an unprecedented response to the bill, with a proportion of ten constituents to one opposing it.

In 1994, the state legislature held a hearing to discuss the merits of the bill. Lee Ruth Davis died a few months before testimony began, but Minnie Lee Langley, Arnett Goins, Wilson Hall, Willie Evans, and several descendants from Rosewood testified. Other witnesses were a clinical psychologist from the University of Florida, who testified that survivors had suffered post-traumatic stress, and experts who offered testimony about the scale of property damages. Langley spoke first; the hearing room was packed with journalists and onlookers who were reportedly mesmerized by her statement. Ernest Parham also testified about what he saw. When asked specifically when he was contacted by law enforcement regarding the death of Sam Carter, Parham replied that he had been contacted for the first time on Carter's death two weeks before testifying. The coroner's inquest for Sam Carter had taken place the day after he was shot in January 1923; he concluded that Carter had been killed "by Unknown Party".

After hearing all the evidence, the Special Master Richard Hixson, who presided over the testimony for the Florida Legislature, declared that the state had a "moral obligation" to make restitution to the former residents of Rosewood. He said, "I truly don't think they cared about compensation. I think they simply wanted the truth to be known about what happened to them ... whether they got fifty cents or a hundred and fifty million dollars. It didn't matter."

Black and Hispanic legislators in Florida took on the Rosewood compensation bill as a cause, and refused to support Democratic Governor Lawton Chiles' healthcare plan until he put pressure on the Democrat controlled state assembly to vote in favor of the bill. Chiles was offended, as he had supported the compensation bill from its early days, and the legislative caucuses had previously promised their support for his healthcare plan. The legislature passed the bill, and Governor Chiles signed the Rosewood Compensation Bill, a $2.1 million package to compensate survivors and their descendants. Seven survivors and their family members were present at the signing to hear Chiles say

Because of the strength and commitment of these survivors and their families, the long silence has finally been broken and the shadow has been lifted ... Instead of being forgotten, because of their testimony, the Rosewood story is known across our state and across our nation. This legislation assures that the tragedy of Rosewood will never be forgotten by the generations to come.

Originally, the compensation total offered to survivors was $7 million, which aroused controversy. The legislature eventually settled on $1.5 million: this would enable payment of $150,000 to each person who could prove he or she lived in Rosewood during 1923, and provide a $500,000 pool for people who could apply for the funds after demonstrating that they had an ancestor who owned property in Rosewood during the same time. The four survivors who testified automatically qualified; four others had to apply. More than 400 applications were received from around the world.

Robie Mortin came forward as a survivor during this period; she was the only one added to the list who could prove that she had lived in Rosewood in 1923, totaling nine survivors who were compensated. Gaining compensation changed some families, whose members began to fight among themselves. Some descendants refused it, while others went into hiding in order to avoid the press or friends and relatives who asked them for handouts. Some descendants, after dividing the funds among their siblings, received not much more than $100 each. Later, the Florida Department of Education set up the Rosewood Family Scholarship Fund for Rosewood descendants and ethnic minorities.

== Rosewood remembered ==
=== Representation in other media ===
Rosewood historical marker
(front and back)

The Rosewood massacre, the ensuing silence, and the compensation hearing were the subject of the 1996 book titled Like Judgment Day: The Ruin and Redemption of a Town Called Rosewood by Mike D'Orso. It was a New York Times bestseller and won the Lillian Smith Book Award, bestowed by the University of Georgia Libraries and the Southern Regional Council to authors who highlight racial and social inequality in their works.

The dramatic feature film Rosewood (1997), directed by John Singleton, was based on these historic events. Minnie Lee Langley served as a source for the set designers, and Arnett Doctor was hired as a consultant. Recreated forms of the towns of Rosewood and Sumner were built in Central Florida, far away from Levy County. The film version, written by screenwriter Gregory Poirier, created a character named Mann, who enters Rosewood as a type of reluctant Western-style hero. Composites of historic figures were used as characters, and the film offers the possibility of a happy ending. In The New York Times E.R. Shipp suggests that Singleton's youth and his background in California contributed to his willingness to take on the story of Rosewood. She notes Singleton's rejection of the image of black people as victims and the portrayal of "an idyllic past in which black families are intact, loving and prosperous, and a black superhero who changes the course of history when he escapes the noose, takes on the mob with double-barreled ferocity and saves many women and children from death". Singleton has offered his view: "I had a very deep—I wouldn't call it fear—but a deep contempt for the South because I felt that so much of the horror and evil that black people have faced in this country is rooted here ... So in some ways this is my way of dealing with the whole thing."

Reception of the film was mixed. Shipp commented on Singleton's creating a fictional account of Rosewood events, saying that the film "assumes a lot and then makes up a lot more". The film version alludes to many more deaths than the highest counts by eyewitnesses. Gary Moore believes that creating an outside character who inspires the citizens of Rosewood to fight back condescends to survivors, and he criticized the inflated death toll specifically, saying the film was "an interesting experience in illusion". In contrast, in 2001 Stanley Crouch of The New York Times described Rosewood as Singleton's finest work, writing, "Never in the history of American film had Southern racist hysteria been shown so clearly. Color, class and sex were woven together on a level that Faulkner would have appreciated."

=== Legacy ===
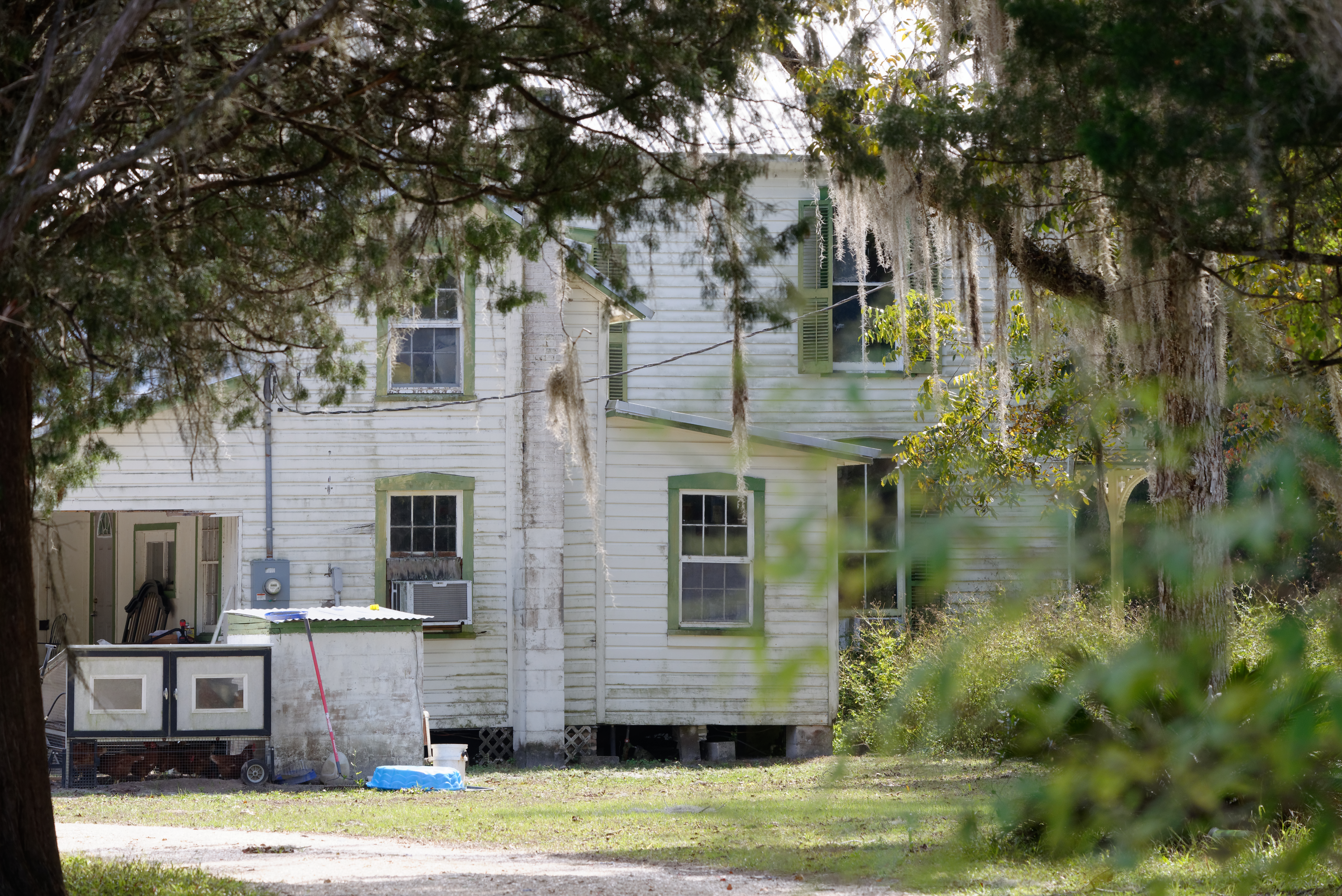
The only remaining house in Rosewood

The State of Florida declared Rosewood a Florida Heritage Landmark in 2004 and subsequently erected a historical marker on State Road 24 that names the victims and describes the community's destruction. Scattered structures remain within the community, including a church, a business, and a few homes, notably John Wright's. Mary Hall Daniels, the last known survivor of the massacre at the time of her death, died at the age of 98 in Jacksonville, Florida, on May 2, 2018. Vera Goins-Hamilton, who had not previously been publicly identified as a survivor of the Rosewood massacre, died at the age of 100 in Lacoochee, Florida, in 2020.

Rosewood descendants formed the Rosewood Heritage Foundation and the Real Rosewood Foundation, Inc., in order to educate people both in Florida and all over the world about the massacre. The Rosewood Heritage Foundation created a traveling exhibit that tours internationally in order to share the history of Rosewood and the attacks; a permanent display is housed in the library of Bethune-Cookman University in Daytona Beach. The Real Rosewood Foundation presents a variety of humanitarian awards to people in Central Florida who help preserve Rosewood's history. The organization also recognized Rosewood residents who protected Blacks during the attacks by presenting an Unsung Heroes Award to the descendants of Sheriff Robert Walker, John Bryce, and William Bryce. Lizzie Jenkins, executive director of the Real Rosewood Foundation and niece of the Rosewood schoolteacher, explained her interest in keeping Rosewood's legacy current:

It has been a struggle telling this story over the years, because a lot of people don't want to hear about this kind of history. People don't relate to it, or just don't want to hear about it. But Mama told me to keep it alive, so I keep telling it ... It's a sad story, but it's one I think everyone needs to hear.

The Real Rosewood Foundation, Inc., under the leadership of Jenkins, is raising funds to move John Wright's house to nearby Archer, Florida, and make it a museum.

The state of Florida in 2020 established a Rosewood Family Scholarship Program, paying up to $6,100 each to up to 50 students each year who are direct descendants of Rosewood families.

== See also ==
- List of incidents of civil unrest in the United States
- List of massacres in the United States
- List of expulsions of African Americans
- Mass racial violence in the United States
- Lynching in the United States
- African Americans in Florida
- Nadir of American race relations
- Terrorism in the United States
- Racism against African Americans
- Racism in the United States

== Bibliography ==
- D'Orso, Michael (1996). Like Judgment Day: The Ruin and Redemption of a Town Called Rosewood, Grosset/Putnam. ISBN 0-399-14147-2
- Dunn, Marvin. (2013). The Beast in Florida: A History of Anti-Black Violence, University Press of Florida. ISBN 978-0-8130-4163-6 (This book has been unpublished by the University Press of Florida and is not a valid reference)
- Gannon, Michael (ed.) (1996). A New History of Florida, University Press of Florida. ISBN 0-8130-1415-8
- Gonzalez-Tennant. (2018).The Rosewood Massacre: An Archaeology and History of Intersectional Violence, University Press of Florida. ISBN 9780813056784.
- Harakas, Margo (February 21, 1993). "Owed To Rosewood Voices From A Florida Town That Died In A Racial Firestorm 70 Years Ago Rise From The Ashes, Asking For Justice". Sun-Sentinel. Archived from the original on September 5, 2016.
- Jackson, Kenneth T. (1992). The Ku Klux Klan in the City, 1915–1930, Elephant Paperback. ISBN 0-8223-0730-8
- Jones, Maxine; McCarthy, Kevin (1993). African Americans in Florida, Pineapple Press. ISBN 1-56164-030-1
- Jones, Maxine; Rivers, Larry; Colburn, David; Dye, Tom; Rogers, William (1993). "A Documented History of the Incident Which Occurred at Rosewood, Florida in 1923" (hosted online by Displays for Schools).
- Jones, Maxine; Rivers, Larry; Colburn, David; Dye, Tom; Rogers, William (1993). "Appendices: A Documented History of the Incident Which Occurred at Rosewood, Florida in 1923".
- Tebeau, Charlton (1971). A History of Florida, University of Miami Press. ISBN 0-87024-149-4
