= Rosewood (film) =

1997 film directed by John Singleton

- Theatrical release poster
- Directed by: John Singleton
- Written by: Gregory Poirier
- Produced by: Jon Peters
- Starring: Jon Voight; Ving Rhames; Don Cheadle; Bruce McGill; Loren Dean; Esther Rolle; Michael Rooker
- Cinematography: Johnny E. Jensen
- Edited by: Bruce Cannon
- Music by: John Williams
- Production companies: Peters Entertainment; New Deal Productions
- Distributed by: Warner Bros.
- Release date: February 21, 1997
- Running time: 142 minutes
- Country: United States
- Language: English
- Budget: $17 million
- Box office: $13.1 million

Rosewood is a 1997 American historical drama film directed by John Singleton, inspired by the 1923 Rosewood massacre in Florida, when a white mob killed black people and destroyed their town. It stars Ving Rhames as an outsider who comes into Rosewood and inspires residents to self-defense, wielding his pistols in a fight. The supporting cast includes Don Cheadle as Sylvester Carrier, a resident who was a witness, defender of his family and victim of the riot; and Jon Voight as John Wright, a sympathetic white store owner who lives in Rosewood. The three characters become entangled in an attempt to save people from racist white people attacking the Black residents of Rosewood. Despite generally favorable reviews, the film was not a commercial success and was unable to recoup its $17 million budget at the box office. The film was entered into the 47th Berlin International Film Festival.

== Plot ==
Mann is a mysterious World War I veteran who is scouting out land to buy. He comes to the town of Rosewood, a small and predominantly black town in Florida. Rosewood is home to the Carriers, an upwardly mobile black family, led by a matriarch, Aunt Sarah, and her proud, headstrong son, Sylvester. Mann soon meets Beulah "Scrappie" Carrier, Sylvester's young cousin and the two quickly fall in love.

Aunt Sarah works as a housekeeper for James Taylor and his wife, Fanny, a white couple who lives in the white town of Sumner. Fanny, who has a history of cheating on her husband, has a rendezvous with her lover while her husband is at work. Fanny argues with her lover, who ends up beating her. Aunt Sarah and her granddaughter, Lee Ruth, overhear the argument and the subsequent beating but do not intervene. A distraught Fanny, despairing of explaining her injuries to her husband, leaves her house and calls for help. She then tells several townspeople that she has been beaten by a black man. The white residents readily believe Fanny's claim. Hearing of an escaped black convict named Jesse Hunter, a posse from Sumner and nearby towns goes to Rosewood to investigate. The black residents of Rosewood are quickly targeted by a white mob, including men from out of state and members of the Ku Klux Klan.

As a stranger, Mann is afraid that he will be accused of attacking Fanny and lynched. He plans to leave town over the protests of several Rosewood residents who have met in a church to discuss plans to defend their community. Outside the church, Mann clashes with John Wright, a Navy Spanish American War veteran and the owner of a general store, one of the few white residents of Rosewood. Wright is also engaging in a torrid extramarital affair with Sylvester's cousin, Jewel; Mann leaves.

When the posse arrives at the Carrier's home, Aunt Sarah attempts to placate the angry crowd. When she announces that Fanny Taylor's attacker had been a white man, someone in the crowd shoots her and she dies of her injuries. The posse comes and Sylvester shoots and kills two of its members. The posse falls back and a shootout erupts. After Aunt Sarah's murder, the posse attacks Rosewood. Mann is on his way out of town when he witnesses the lynching of Sam Carter, the blacksmith. Changing his mind about leaving, Mann returns to Rosewood to fight alongside the residents.

The posse swells in number. Believing that James Carrier held information about the escaped convict, they seek him out. After making an unsuccessful attempt to intervene on James' behalf, Wright reluctantly allows Sheriff Walker to take Carrier into custody because the officer said he only wanted to question him. When Carrier says he doesn't have any information, he is immediately shot by one of the members of the mob. Wright gets upset and the mob accuses him of being soft on blacks.

The violence escalates and spills out into neighboring towns. When the posse gets to the border of Alachua County, a group of armed deputized white men and a sheriff block the roads and turn them back. Surviving members of the Carrier family eventually escape on a train, which had been arranged by Wright. Scrappie and Mann finally share a kiss before Mann departs with Sylvester. The two plan to meet up later. After the violence dies down, James Taylor confronts his wife, Fanny. He realizes that Fanny has lied to him about the true cause of her injuries and had affairs with other men after being told by the sheriff and the townspeople. Officially the final death toll was eight people, two white and six black. Other accounts by survivors and several African-American newspapers place the number anywhere from 40 to 150.

== Cast ==
- Ving Rhames as Mann
- Don Cheadle as Sylvester Carrier
- Jon Voight as John Wright
- Bruce McGill as Duke Purdy
- Loren Dean as James Taylor
- Esther Rolle as Aunt Sarah
- Elise Neal as Beulah (Scrappie)
- Bridgid Coulter as Gertrude
- Robert Patrick as Fanny's Lover
- Michael Rooker as Sheriff Walker
- Catherine Kellner as Fanny Taylor
- Akosua Busia as Jewel
- Paul Benjamin as James Carrier
- Kevin Jackson as Sam Carter
- Mark Boone Junior as Poly
- Muse Watson as Henry Andrews
- Badja Djola as John Bradley
- Kathryn Meisle as Mary Wright
- Jaimz Woolvett as Deputy Earl
- Vanessa Baden as Lee-Ruth (Philomena)

== Production ==
Minnie Lee Langley, a survivor, served as a source for the set designers, and Arnett Doctor, son of a survivor, was hired as a consultant. Recreated sets of the towns of Rosewood and Sumner were built in Central Florida, far away from Levy County, where the events took place. The film version, written by screenwriter Gregory Poirier, created a character named Mann, who enters Rosewood as a type of reluctant Western-style hero. Composites of historic figures were used as characters, and the film offers the possibility of a happy ending.

Asked about why he decided to tackle this subject, Singleton said: "I had a very deep—I wouldn't call it fear—but a deep contempt for the South because I felt that so much of the horror and evil that black people have faced in this country is rooted here ... So in some ways this is my way of dealing with the whole thing." The production spent $11.7 million filming in Central Florida, with Singleton saying it accounted for 70% of the film's budget.

== Critical reception ==
On Rotten Tomatoes the film holds an approval rating of 87% based on 55 reviews, with an average rating of 7.1/10. The site's critics consensus reads: "In some respects, Rosewood struggles to present a full picture of the real-life tragedy it dramatizes, but it remains a harrowing depiction of racial violence." Metacritic assigned the film a weighted average score of 71 out of 100, based on 20 critics, indicating "generally favorable reviews". Audiences polled by CinemaScore gave the film an average grade of "A" on an A+ to F scale.

Roger Ebert gives the film 3.5 stars out of 4, stating that "... What makes it more is the way it shows how racism breeds and feeds, and is taught by father to son. ... it's not easily summarized in ads and does not obviously appeal to either blacks (since it documents such a depressing chapter) or whites (depicted as murderous or ineffectual). Perhaps it will appeal to people looking for a well-made film that tells a gripping, important story. Now there's a notion."

Stanley Crouch of The New York Times described Rosewood as Singleton's finest work, writing: "Never in the history of American film had Southern racist hysteria been shown so clearly. Color, class and sex were woven together on a level that Faulkner would have appreciated."

E. R. Shipp in The New York Times suggested that Singleton's youth and his background in California contributed to his willingness to take on the story of Rosewood. She noted Singleton's rejection of the image of blacks as victims and portrayal of "an idyllic past in which black families are intact, loving and prosperous, and a black superhero who changes the course of history when he escapes the noose, takes on the mob with double-barreled ferocity and saves many women and children from death". Shipp commented on Singleton's creating a fictional account of the Rosewood events, saying that the film "assumes a lot and then makes up a lot more". The film version alludes to many more deaths than the highest counts by eyewitnesses. Journalist Gary Moore, who reported the events in 1982, breaking open decades of silence, believed that Singleton's creating Mann, an outside character who inspires the citizens of Rosewood to fight back, was condescending to survivors. He also criticized the inflated death toll, saying the film was "an interesting experience in illusion".

In retrospect, Gregory Poirier, who wrote the film's screenplay, said: "Rosewood didn't do much box office. The reviews were generally good, and Siskel and Ebert raved about it, but John [Singleton] was right; it was in many ways too difficult to watch, a chapter of American history most Americans don't want to be confronted with.

At the time of its release, director John Singleton said:

"People say it's violent. I don't think it is, and certainly not as violent as it was being there. I wanted to make you feel you were there. But then maybe Americans are afraid of it because of their own racial problems. They're all fucked up over race, you know."

In retrospect, he said: "It wasn't one of my more successful pictures box office–wise but I think it's one of the best I've done. The same weekend it was released Booty Call came out. I think more black folks were comfortable watching Booty Call that weekend than Rosewood ... which is a shame... I feel the more we embrace our history the better we can defend against being oppressed in our present".

== See also ==
- Banished

== Bibliography ==
- D'Orso, Michael. Like Judgement Day: The Ruin and Redemption of a Town Called Rosewood. [S.l.]: Boulevard, 1996.
- Loewen, James W. (2005). Sundown Towns: A Hidden Dimension of American Racism. New York: New Press.
- Henry, Charles P. (2007). Long Overdue: the Politics of Racial Reparations. New York University Press. ISBN 9780814736920.
- Rosewood. Dir. John Singleton. Perf. Ving Rhames and Jon Voight. Warner Bros., 1997. DVD.
