= Stephen Hanlon =

American public defender reformer and civil rights attorney

Stephen F. Hanlon
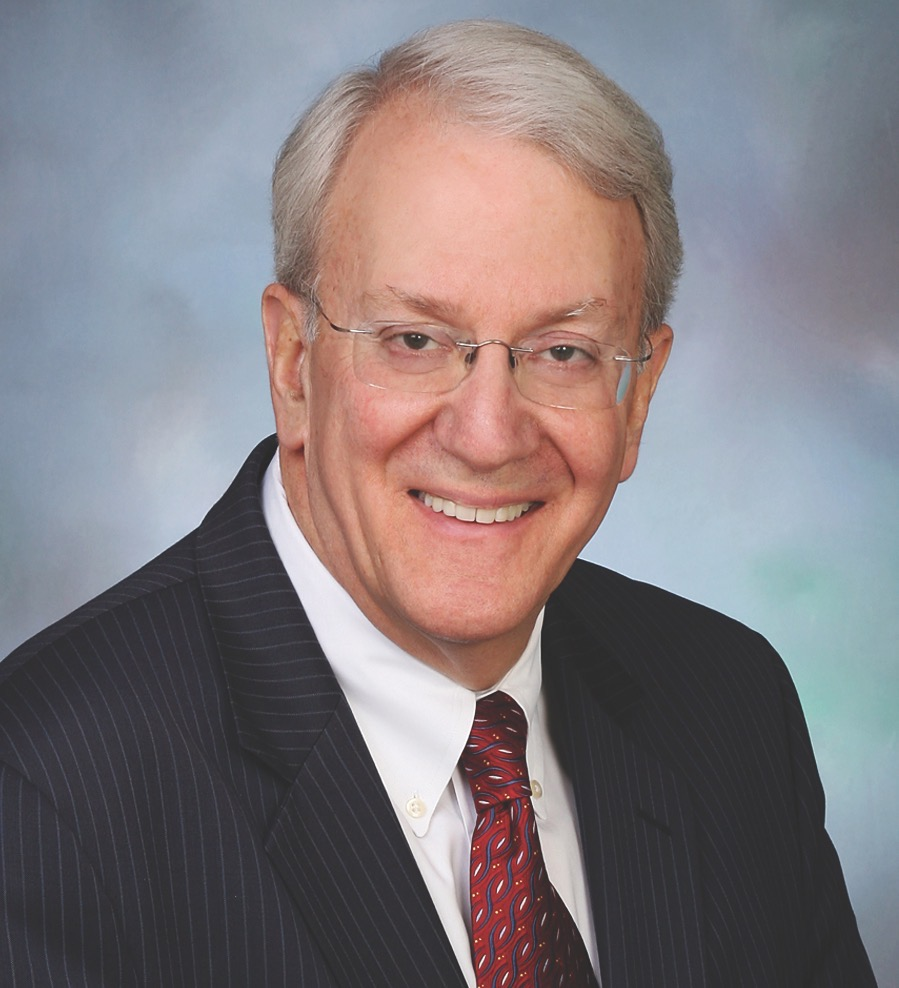
- Born: December 1, 1941 (age 84); St. Louis, Missouri
- Education: University of Missouri School of Law (LLB)
- Alma mater: Saint Louis University (B.A.), University of Missouri School of Law (J.D.) 1966
- Occupations: Civil Rights Lawyer and Nationally Recognized Indigent Defense Expert
- Known for: Public defender and civil rights lawyer
- Spouse: Frances Giarraffa
- Children: 3
- Website: lawyerhanlon.com

Stephen F. Hanlon (born December 1, 1941) is an American attorney who was a partner at Holland & Knight and took on many civil rights cases such as the Rosewood massacre and for the Havasupai Indians. He was the lead attorney in the 1983 Debra P. v. Turlington case that fought against Florida's State Literacy Test, which affected mostly poor and people of color. In 1989, he established the pro bono practice at Holland & Knight, and after retiring from the firm in 2012, he served as the project director for multiple state studies documenting excessive workloads for public defenders. His work has led to legislative reforms, court decisions, and national standards for indigent defense.

== Early life and education ==
Hanlon grew up in a large Catholic Irish family in St. Louis, Missouri where according to Hanlon "we learned to fight at home". He attended St. Louis University High School and felt he had an excellent education by the Jesuit teachers. Initially intending to join the priesthood, Hanlon enrolled in a seminary but left after one semester, later joking about his misapprehension regarding the vow of celibacy. He attended Saint Louis University where, in his senior year, he met the woman who would later become his wife, Fran Giarraffa. He received his JD at the University of Missouri School of Law. After law school he went to work with his father, who Hanlon called a "craftsman of a lawyer", "respected as a lawyer's lawyer". These years working with his father, Hanlon remembered as "very formative years".

== Career ==
After leaving his father’s practice, Hanlon began looking for more purposeful work. In 1979, the State of Florida proposed a State Literacy Test for its graduating high school seniors. Hanlon, who was living in Tampa at that time, read about an audit in the Tampa Tribune which explained that the local legal services organization was not doing enough impact litigation.

Hanlon was interested and soon became the Director of Litigation for Bay Area Legal Services in Tampa. In 1978, Hanlon hired Robert J. Shapiro to be his Assistant Director of Litigation. Shapiro had spent 2 years as a staff attorney at Florida Rural Legal Services. In Shapiro, Hanlon found a kindred spirit. He and Shapiro brought and prevailed in one of the first lawsuits against a strawberry grower on behalf of migrant farm workers under the Farm Labor Contractor Registration Act. His association with Shapiro produced several civil rights lawsuits the most significant one being the “Functional literacy test” lawsuit.

Both he and Shapiro (who was then a staff attorney at Florida Rural Legal Services) learned that the school system was not teaching what was on the test, which mostly affected poor and African-American students, as they were unable to receive their high school diplomas. The trial court, relying on a state witness, ruled that the test was "instructionally valid", the question being that "whether past discrimination affected black test results today and whether the tested material was taught in schools." Hanlon responded that the District Judge George Carr "erred" as he relied "on a state expert whose familiarity with desegregation in Florida was 'virtually non-existent' ... the documentary record alone established that vestiges (of discrimination) affected performance." Hanlon was the lead attorney, with Shapiro as co-counsel, in the 1983 case Debra P. v. Turlington, that concluded with a ruling which required more on-site visits inside classrooms, more student surveys and allowing students to take a 13th year in high school or adult school classes in order to bring them up to the standards of the literacy test. The case resulted in a four-year injunction against the state’s use of the Functional Literacy Test to deny diplomas.”

In the 1980s Hanlon left the Bay Area Legal Service for corporate practice. He said that the firm called themselves a "lean, mean, billing machine" and started making enough money to send his three children to college. In the late 80's while working with the Democratic party, he was canvassed by lawyer friends that wanted Hanlon to run for Congress. Hanlon turned the offer down, but took the opportunity to ask for a position at Holland & Knight. He set up a pro bono department, which at the time was uncommon

In 1996 Hanlon advocated for the firm’s pro bono department to take the murder case of Joseph “Crazy Joe” Spaziano. He had been convicted and sentenced to death for a 1996 killing, his conviction and death sentence hinging on the testimony of a witness who was now ready to recant. Holland & Knight teamed up with legendary Florida criminal defense lawyer James Russ and that team overturned Spaziano’s conviction and death sentence.

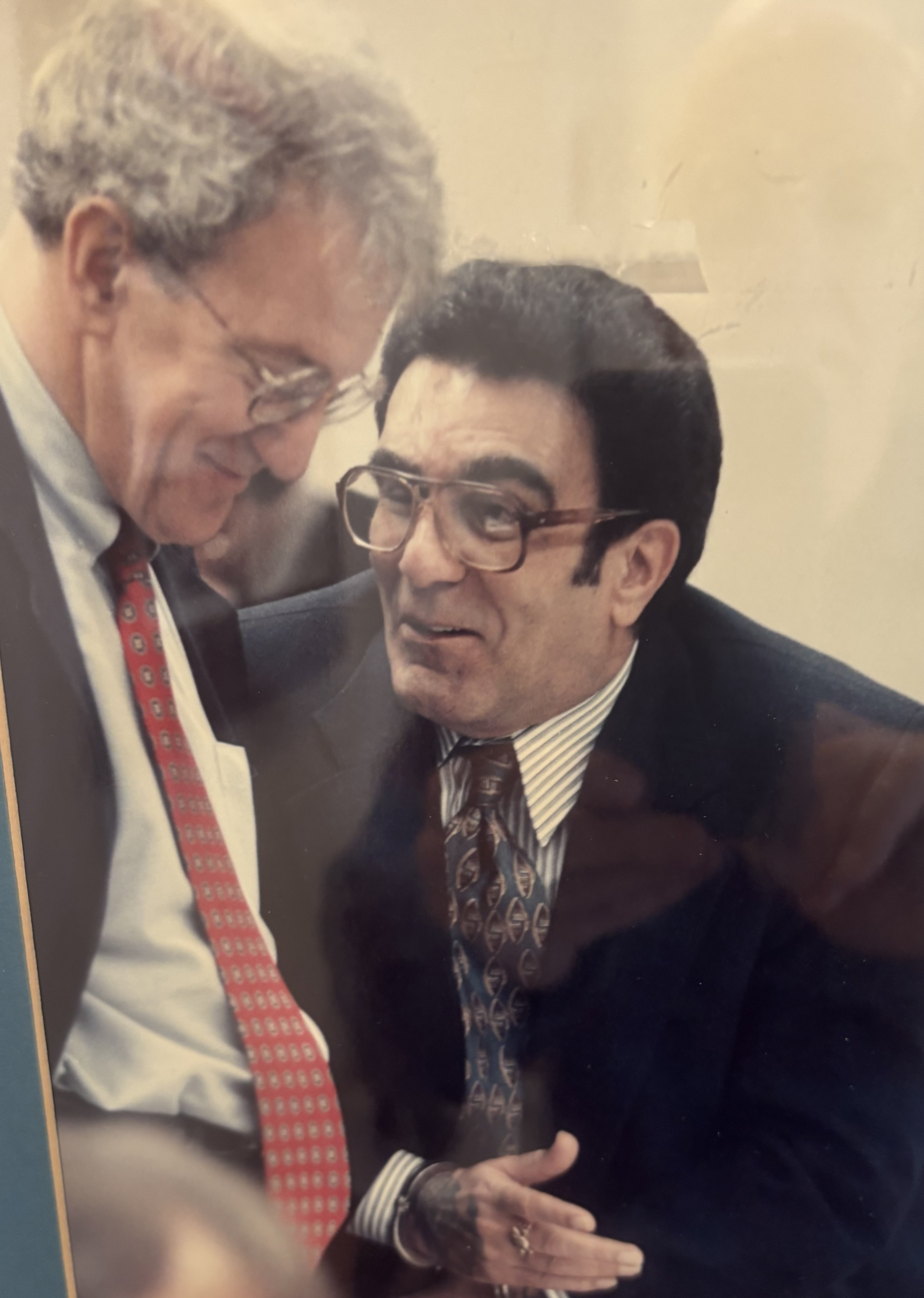
Hanlon (left) jokes with Joseph "Crazy Joe" Spaziano in a 1996 hearing

Hanlon and Holland & Knight took on the Rosewood massacre case hoping to get reparations for survivors and their families for a crime that had taken place in January 1923 in rural Levy County, Florida. Hanlon brought on lawyer Martha Barnett, who he credits for successfully changing the minds of the Florida state legislature. In April 1994, Holland & Knight won a 2.1 million dollar settlement for survivors and descendants.

Hanlon worked as the pro-bono attorney for the Havasupai Indians, who live at the bottom of the Grand Canyon. The tribe had discovered that blood samples that had been given under the pretence of studying the tribe's high rate of diabetes but had actually been used to test for mental illness, and to disprove the tribe’s geographical origin story that their ancestors were born in the Grand Canyon, not India. Hanlon won a $700,000 settlement for the Havasupai, as well as the ceremonial return of the blood samples.

In 2012, Hanlon retired as a partner from Holland & Knight and in 2014 joined the faculty at St. Louis University as a professor of practice where he taught a class "dubbed 'Hanlon & Associates' which he operated like a small law firm."

One is the supply side – give us more lawyers. Adequate funding for the public defenders is essential,” Hanlon says. “On the demand side, misdemeanor cases are clogging up the system and causing horrific collateral consequences – inability to get a job, education, housing, military. We need to get out of the criminalization of poverty, of homelessness, of mental illness, of drug addiction. These people do not need to be placed in cages or fined and feed into eternal poverty; they need social workers. The only reason they need lawyers is because we attach jail to it. Cages are not the answer.

— Stephen Hanlon

=== Reform ===
As the lead counsel in Missouri Public Defender in State ex rel. Mo. Public Defender Commission, Hanlon and team managed to get the State Supreme Court to allow a public defender office to refuse to take on more cases when their workload was excessive. The public defenders were found to spend only two hours per misdemeanor case, while twelve were needed to provide adequate defense. They determined that it would be "'unethical and unconstitutional'" to force more assignments than a public defender could handle.

With a grant from the American Bar Association in 2014, Hanlon partnered with the accounting firm RubinBrown to investigate using econometrics to determine the workload of public defenders of Missouri. The ABA released the analysis called The Missouri Project which gave a blueprint for studying other states' public defenders workloads. "It found that for serious felonies, defenders in Missouri spent an average of only nine hours on their cases, compared with the 47 hours needed. For misdemeanors, they spent only two hours, while 12 were called for."

In February 2017 a collaborative research effort by the American Bar Association Standing Committee on Legal Aid and Indigent Defendants (ABA) released The Louisiana Project which looked specifically at the State of Louisiana and the workload of public defenders. It was determined that public defenders had five times more cases assigned to them, than they could adequately assist. Funding for the study was provided by the Laura and John Arnold Foundation and leadership by certified public accountants Daniel Gardiner and Jason MacMorran and project leader for the ABA, Hanlon.

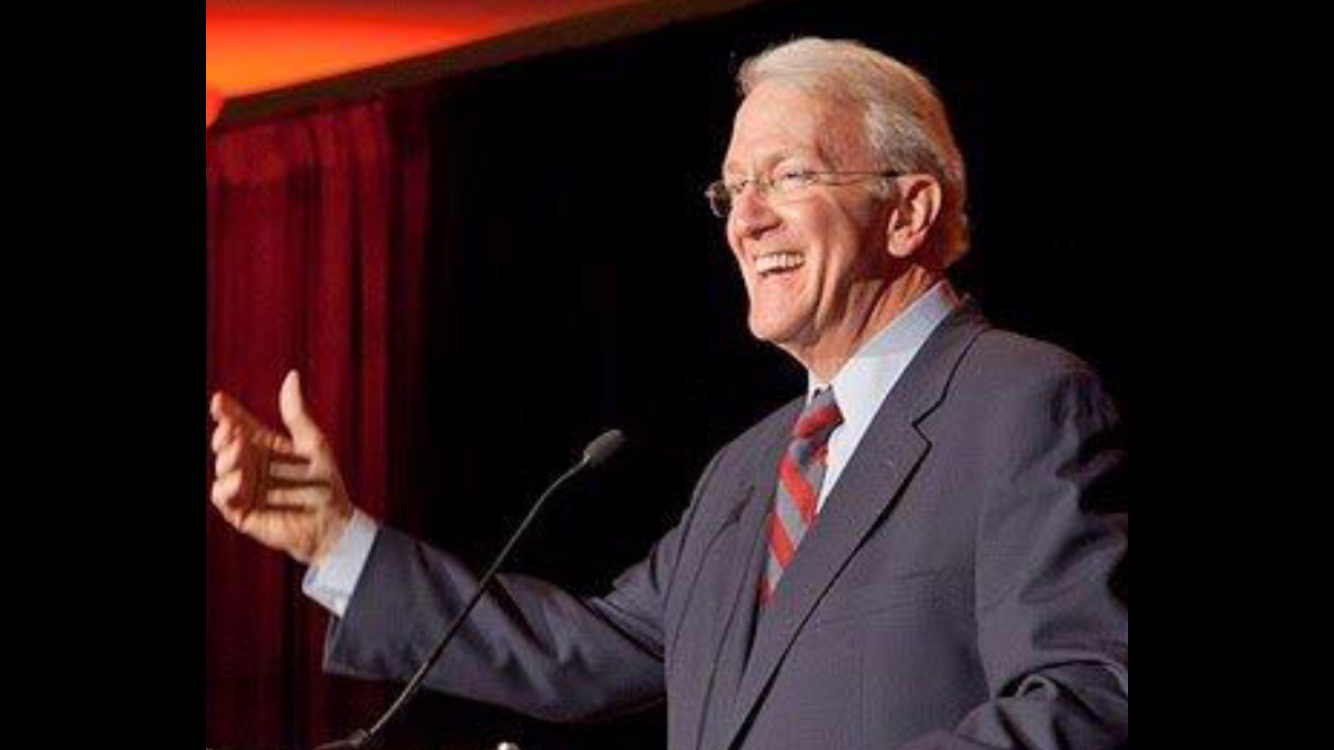
Hanlon speaking at National Center for Women and the Arts

According to the journalist Richard Oppel, "Stephen Hanlon thinks he has a new solution to this problem: better data, and a lot of it. ... His goal is to complete studies in a dozen states to create a new standard that will help judges and policymakers determine how many cases public defenders can ethically handle before their clients’ rights are violated." Then allow judges and public defenders to know when to cut off allowing more cases to be added to their work load.

In 2021, the state of Oregon using the same methodology and a grant from the ABA worked with the accounting firm Moss Adams to look at the workload of Oregon public defenders. Determining that the state had a 69% shortage to meet their current caseload. "A defendant’s right to effective counsel is guaranteed under the Sixth Amendment of the U.S. Constitution." Hanlon served as the project director for this report and was quoted as saying "This is a serious national problem ... We can’t do this anymore. It’s against the law everywhere."

In a 2023 interview for The Times-News Hanlon said that they have completed 17 state studies and have "reliable data" that will prove "the extent to which public defenders are overworked". He is advocating for federal legislation and with this data will have "'a very powerful lever'" to push for improvements." Hanlon says this is a "watershed moment in public defense"

When obstetricians have five times as much work as they can handle competently, terrible things happen. If a public defender, with people's liberty at stake, has three to five times as many cases as he or she can handle competently, terrible things will happen. ...You cannot do mass incarceration unless the whole justice system rolls over and plays dead.

— Stephen Hanlon

=== Awards and honors ===
- Nelson Poynter Award, American Civil Liberties Union of Florida, 1996
- Steven M. Goldstein Criminal Justice Award, Florida Association of Criminal Lawyers, 2001
- Equal Justice Award, Southern Center for Human Rights, 2001
- Pro Bono Award, The Florida Bar Appellate Practice Section, 2004
- Citation of Merit, University of Missouri Columbia School of Law, 2006
- Chesterfield Smith Lawyer Award, 2006
- Champions Award, The Legal Times, 2012
- Robert F. Drinan Award, Individual Rights and Responsibilities Section, American Bar Association, 2013

== Professional organizations and associations ==
- General Counsel, National Association for Public Defense, www.publicdefenders.us (22,000 members), 2014–2020
- Past Chairman, The Florida Bar, Public Interest Law Section
- Past President, Florida Legal Services
- Past Chair of the Executive Council, American Bar Association, Individual Rights and Responsibilities Section
- Past Chair, American Bar Association, Death Penalty Moratorium Implementation Project
- Chair, Indigent Defense Advisory Group, Standing Committee on Legal Aid and Indigent Defense, American Bar Association
- Past Chair, The Constitution Project, The Constitution Project
- Adjunct Professor of Law, Georgetown University Law Center

== Personal life ==
Stephen Halon and his wife Fran have three children.
