= Perry massacre =

Racially motivated conflict in Florida, USA

Coordinates: 30.1134°N 83.5819°W

Perry massacres
- Part of Jim Crow Era
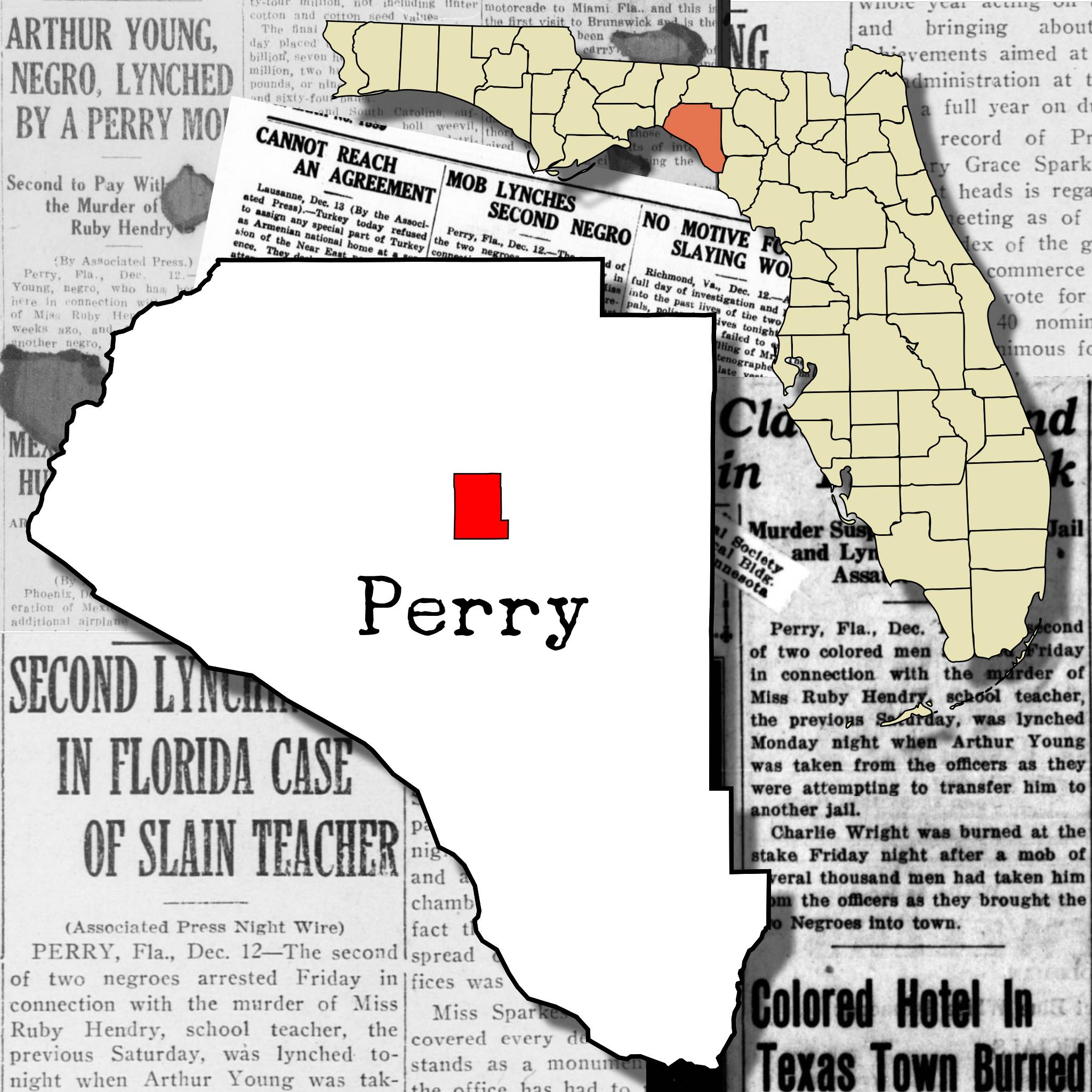
- News coverage of the Perry massacre
- Date: December 6, 1922 - Cubrit Dixon; December 8, 1922 - Charles Wright; December 12, 1922 - Albert Young; December 15, 1922 - Unidentified Black man
- Location: Perry, Florida
- Participants: A white mob kills 4 Black men in December 1922
- Deaths: 4

The Perry massacre was a racially motivated conflict in Perry, Florida, in December 1922. Whites killed four black men, including Charles Wright, who was lynched by being burned at the stake, and they also destroyed several buildings in the black community of Perry after the murder of Ruby Hendry, a white female schoolteacher.

== Background ==
The body of a young white woman, Annie "Ruby" Hendry, was found with her throat slashed, lying in a pool of blood, at 4:40 p.m. on December 2, 1922, in Perry in Taylor County, Florida. Her face was badly disfigured from having been beaten with a blunt instrument, so it took half an hour to determine her identity. On December 5, the police had linked the murder weapons found at the scene, a double-barrelled shotgun and a bloody razor, to a black man who had been residing in the area and using the name "Charley Wright". He was determined to be an escaped convict from adjacent Dixie County. Search parties with guns and bloodhounds were everywhere. Each night after the body was found, buildings serving the black community in Perry were burnt down: schoolhouse, lodge, amusement hall, and then the church.

Authorities deputized local citizens and the roads were sealed. On December 6, Cubrit Dixon, a black man coming from Madison County into Taylor County, was stopped and told to put his hands up by armed citizens who had been deputized. Dixon was shot and killed when he did not comply, and witnesses said he had seemed to be reaching for a gun in his back pocket. Examination of his body found only a closed pocketknife in his back pocket.

On December 7, Albert Young, another black man, was arrested in Valdosta, Georgia. Young was an escaped convict from Kindlon, Georgia, and an acquaintance of Wright's. On December 8, Charley Wright was arrested in Madison County and identified by police as having used the name "Jim Stalworth". Wright was then reported to have confessed to murdering Ruby Hendry and Young was reported to have admitted to having been with Wright. However, it was also reported that Wright said Young had not participated in the murder.

On December 8, 1922, a crowd of 3,000 to 5,000 white men stopped the transportation of the prisoners and took them for a kangaroo court trial. Wright was determined by the mob to be guilty and burned to death. Young was returned to sheriff's custody and taken to the jail in Taylor County. On December 12, when Young was being moved from the jail, he was abducted and shot to death by a smaller mob.

The Madison–Enterprise newspaper reported on December 15, 1922, that a black man in Perry had been "accused of writing 'an improper note' to a white woman. As retribution for these actions, the man was shot to death in his home and his home was burned down on him."

Wright, a 21-year-old escaped convict, and Albert (or Arthur) Young, his alleged accomplice, were arrested and jailed for Hendry's murder. A mob several thousand strong, made up of local and out-of-state whites, seized the accused from the sheriff, and extracted a "confession" from Wright by torturing him. Wright claimed to have acted alone. He was subsequently burned at the stake and the crowd collected souvenirs of his body parts and clothing. Following this, two more black men were shot and hanged. Whites burned the town's black school, Masonic lodge, church, amusement hall, and several families' homes.

== See also ==
- 1906 Atlanta race massacre
- Ocoee massacre
- Rosewood massacre
- Tulsa race massacre
- List of incidents of civil unrest in the United States

== Bibliography ==
Notes

References

- Ginzburg, Ralph (1988). 100 Years of Lynchings. Black Classic Press. ISBN 9780933121188.
- Henry, C. Michael (2004). Race, Poverty, and Domestic Policy. Yale University Press. ISBN 9780300095418.
- Henry, Charles P. (2007). Long Overdue: The Politics of Racial Reparations. NYU Press. ISBN 978-0-8147-3692-0.
- Martinez, Meghan (2008). Racial Violence and Competing Memory in Taylor County Florida. M.A. thesis, Florida State University.
- Robertson, Campbell (April 25, 2018). "A Lynching Memorial Is Opening. The Country Has Never Seen Anything Like It". The New York Times.
- United States Senate Committee on the Judiciary (1926). "To Prevent and Punish the Crime of Lynching: Hearings Before the United States Senate Committee on the Judiciary, Subcommittee on S. 121, Sixty-Ninth Congress, First Session, on Feb. 16, 1926". United States Government Publishing Office.

Number	Name	Date	Place	Method of lynching	Number of victims
1	Bill McAllister	January 8, 1922	Williamsburg, S.C.	Shot	1
2	Lincoln Hickson	January 8, 1922	Williamsburg, S.C.	Shot	1
3	Willie Jenkins	January 10, 1922	Eufaula, Alabama	Shot	1
4	Jake Brooks	January 14, 1922	Oklahoma City, Oklahoma	Hanged	1
5	Charles Strong	January 17, 1922	Mayo, Florida	Hanged	1
6	Will Bell	January 29, 1922	Pontotoc, Mississippi	Shot	1
7	Unidentified	January 29, 1922	Pontotoc, Mississippi	Shot	
8	Drew Conner (White)	January 28, 1922	Bolinger, Alabama	Burned	1
9	Will Thrasher	February 1, 1922	Crystal Springs, Mississippi	Hanged	1
10	Harry Harrison	February 2, 1922	Malvern, Arkansas	Shot	1
11	Manuel Duarte	February 2, 1922	Cameron County, Texas	Shot	1
12	P. Norman	February 11, 1922	Texarkana, Arkansas	Shot	1
13	Will Jones	February 13, 1922	Ellaville, Georgia	Shot	1
14	William Baker	March 8, 1922	Aberdeen, Mississippi	Hanged	1
15	Alfred Williams	March 12, 1922	Harlem, Georgia	Hanged	1
16	Brown Culpepper (White)	March 13, 1922	Holly Grove, Louisiana	Shot	1
17	Jerry Ingram	March 17, 1922	Crawford, Mississippi	Shot	1
18	Unidentified (white)	March 19, 1922	Okay, Oklahoma	Drowned	1
19	Alexander Smith	March 22, 1922	Gulfport, Mississippi	Hanged	1
20	Snap Curry	May 6, 1922	Kirvin, Texas	Burned	1
21	H. Varney (or Johnnie Cornish)	May 6, 1922	Kirvin, Texas	Burned	1
22	Mose Jones	May 6, 1922	Kirvin, Texas	Burned	1
23	Tom Cornish	May 8, 1922	Kirvin, Texas	Hanged	1
24	Thomas Early	May 17, 1922	Conroe, Texas	Burned	1
25	Charles Atkins	May 18, 1922	Davisboro, Georgia	Burned	1
26	Hullen Owens	May 19, 1922	Texarkana, Texas	Hanged (body burned)	1
27	Joe Winters	May 20, 1922	Conroe, Texas	Burned	1
28	Mose Bozier	May 20, 1922	Alleyton, Texas	Hanged	1
29	Gilbert Wilson	May 23, 1922	Bryan, Texas	Beaten to death	1
30	Jesse Thomas	May 26, 1922	Waco, Texas	Shot (body burned)	1
31	William Byrd	May 28, 1922	Brentwood, Georgia	Shot (body burned)	1
32	Robert Collins	June 20, 1922	Summit, Mississippi	Hanged	1
33	Warren Lewis	June 23, 1922	New Dacus, Texas	Hanged	1
34	James Harvey	July 1, 1922	Lanes Bridge, Georgia	Hanged	1
35	Joe Jordan	July 1, 1922	Lanes Bridge, Georgia	Hanged	1
36	Philip Tankard	July 5, 1922	Belhaven, North Carolina	Shot	1
37	Joe Pemberton	July 7, 1922	Benton, Louisiana	Hanged	1
38	Jake "Shake" Davis	July 14, 1922	Miller County, Georgia	Hanged	1
39	Oscar Mack	July 18, 1922	Orange County, Florida	Hanged (False report, Oscar Mack survived)	1
40	Will Anderson	July 24, 1922	Allentown, Georgia	Shot	1
41	John West	July 28, 1922	Guernsey, Arkansas	Shot	1
42	Gilbert Harris	August 1, 1922	Hot Springs, Arkansas	Hanged	1
43	John Glover	August 1, 1922	Holton,	Shot	1
44	Bayner Blackwell	August 6, 1922	Swansboro, North Carolina	Shot	1
45	John Steelman	August 23, 1922	Lambert, Mississippi	Burned	1
46	Thomas Rivers	August 30, 1922	Bossier Parish, Louisiana	Hanged	1
47	F. Watt Daniels (White)	August 1922	Mer Rouge, Louisiana	Ku-Klux Klan	1
48	Thomas F. Richards (White)	August 1922	Mer Rouge, Louisiana	Ku-Klux Klan	1
49	Jim Reed Long	September 2, 1922	Winder, Georgia	Ku-Klux Klan	1
50	O.J. Johnson	September 7, 1922	Newton, Texas	Hanged	1
51	Jim Johnston	September 28, 1922	Sandersville, Georgia	Hanged	1
52	Grover C. Everett	September 28, 1922	Abilene, Texas	Shot	1
53	John Brown	October 3, 1922	Montgomery, Alabama	Shot	1
54	Ed Hartley (white)	October 20, 1922	Camden, Tennessee	Shot	1
55	George Hartley (white)	October 20, 1922	Camden, Tennessee	Shot	1
56	Elias V. Zarate	November 11, 1922	Weslaco, Texas	Shot	1
57	Cupid Dickson / Cubrit Dixon	December 5, 1922	Madison, Florida	Shot	1
58	Charles Wright	December 8 ,1922	Perry, Florida	Burned	1
59	Less Smith	December 9, 1922	Morrilton, Arkansas	Burned	1
60	George Gay	December 11, 1922	Streetman, Texas	Hanged	1
61	Arthur Young	December 11, 1922	Perry, Florida	Hanged	1
