= John Singleton =

American filmmaker (1968–2019)

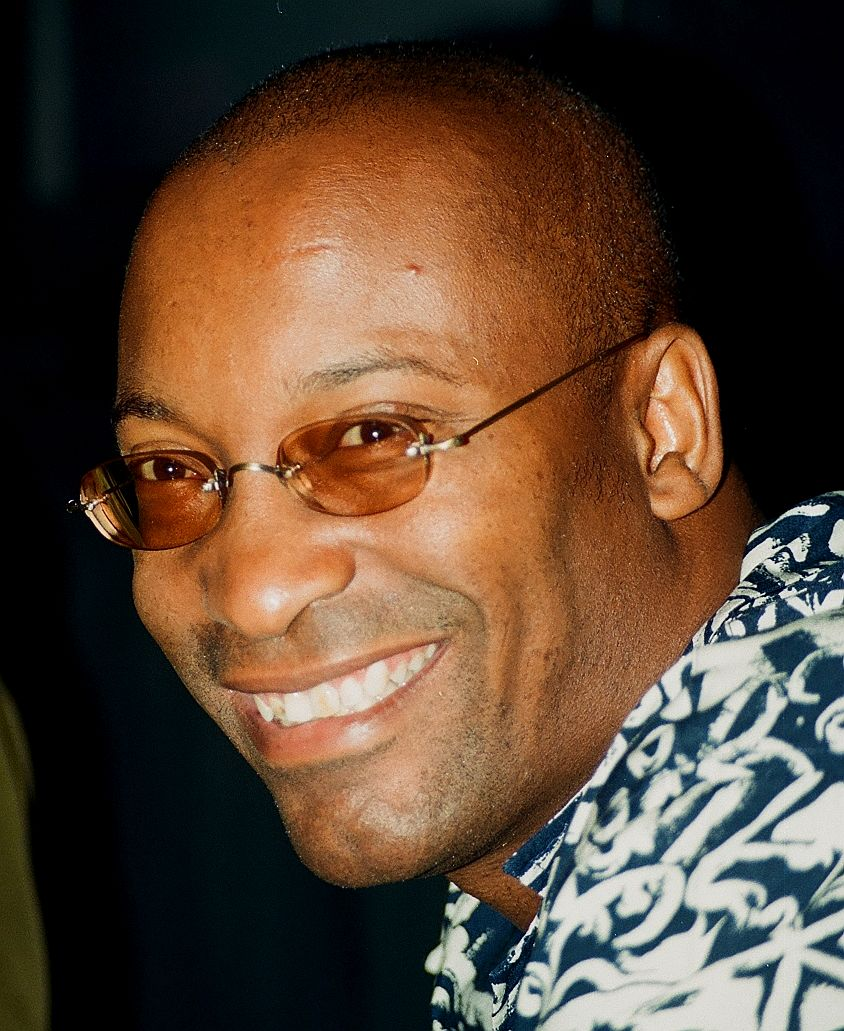
- Singleton in 2000
- Born: John Daniel Singleton; January 6, 1968; Los Angeles, California, U.S.
- Died: April 28, 2019 (aged 51); Los Angeles, California, U.S.
- Resting place: Forest Lawn Memorial Park, Hollywood Hills, California, U.S.
- Education: Pasadena City College; University of Southern California
- Occupations: Director; screenwriter; producer
- Years active: 1988–2019
- Spouse: Akosua Busia (m. 1996; div. 1997)
- Children: 7

John Daniel Singleton (January 6, 1968 – April 28, 2019) was an American director, screenwriter, and producer. He made his feature film debut writing and directing Boyz n the Hood (1991), for which he was nominated for the Academy Award for Best Director, becoming, at age 24, the first African American and youngest nominee in the category.

Singleton went on to write and direct other films, such as the romantic drama Poetic Justice (1993), the socially conscious college-based drama Higher Learning (1995), the historical drama Rosewood (1997), the crime film Shaft (2000), the coming-of-age drama Baby Boy (2001) and the action films 2 Fast 2 Furious (2003), and Four Brothers (2005). In television, he co-created the television crime drama Snowfall and directed episodes of shows such as Empire, Rebel and the fifth episode of The People v. O. J. Simpson: American Crime Story. He was nominated for the Primetime Emmy Award for Outstanding Directing for a Limited Series, Movie, or Dramatic Special for the latter.

One of the most successful and groundbreaking directors in African-American cinema, Singleton and his films represented the African-American urban experience, focusing on themes such as black masculinity, trauma, racism and identity. Singleton frequently cast rappers and musicians, such as Ice Cube, Tupac Shakur, Janet Jackson, Q-Tip, Busta Rhymes, Tyrese Gibson, Snoop Dogg, Ludacris and André 3000 in prominent roles.

== Early life and education ==
John Singleton was born on January 6, 1968, in Los Angeles, the son of Shelia Ward-Johnson (later Morgan), a pharmaceutical company sales executive, and Danny Singleton, a real estate agent, mortgage broker, and financial planner. In a 1993 DIRT magazine interview with Veronica Chambers, Singleton says of his childhood, "When I was growing up, comic books, video games and movies were my buffer against all the drugs, the partying and shit [...] I never grew up with a whole lot of white people. I grew up in a black neighborhood." He attended Eisenhower High School, Blair High School, Pasadena City College and the USC School of Cinema-Television.

Singleton was a spring 1987 initiate into the Beta Omega chapter of Kappa Alpha Psi and graduated from USC in 1990. Singleton considered pursuing computer science, but enrolled in USC's Filmic Writing program under Margaret Mehring. The program was designed to take students directly into the Hollywood system as proficient writer/directors.

== Career ==
=== 1990s: Early career and breakthrough ===
In 1991, Singleton made his feature film debut with Boyz n the Hood, a coming-of-age crime drama about three childhood friends growing up in the crime-ridden neighborhood of South Central LA. Starring Cuba Gooding Jr., Ice Cube, Nia Long, Morris Chestnut, Angela Bassett, Regina King, and Laurence Fishburne, the film was both a critical and commercial success. It debuted at the Cannes Film Festival. For his efforts, Singleton received Academy Award nominations for Best Original Screenplay and Best Director. At age 24, he became the youngest person ever nominated for Best Director and the first African-American to be nominated for the award. In 2002, the United States Library of Congress deemed the film "culturally significant" and selected it for preservation in the National Film Registry.

In 1992, following the success of Boyz n the Hood, Singleton went on to direct VFX-driven "Remember the Time" music video for Michael Jackson, which featured Eddie Murphy, Iman, and Magic Johnson.

In 1993, Singleton wrote and directed his second film, Poetic Justice, a romantic drama about a young African-American woman named Justice (played by Janet Jackson, in her film debut) who writes poetry to deal with the loss of her boyfriend to gun violence but soon encounters a postal worker (played by Tupac Shakur), who helps her overcome depression. The film received mixed reviews from critics, but earned Jackson Academy Award and Golden Globe nominations for Best Original Song for "Again", which reached number one on the Billboard Hot 100.

In 1995, Singleton wrote and directed Higher Learning, a socially conscious drama about the intense racial and social tension in a university campus. Like Poetic Justice, the film received mixed reviews. Regarding his work with 1990s rappers, Singleton states,

"I come from the same place as rappers. It's cool because it's just another form of communication. I have the same sensibilities as rappers. I'm not bourgeois and everything, thinking I'm better than folks. I see myself as the first filmmaker from the hip-hop generation. I've grown up with hip-hop music. The films I make have a hip-hop aesthetic. It may not have rap in it, but there's a whole culture and politics that go with the music. It's young, black culture-that's what I deal with in my films."

In 1997, following the mixed reception of Poetic Justice and Higher Learning, Singleton's fourth film, Rosewood, a historical drama based on racial violence during the 1923 Rosewood massacre in Florida, received generally positive reviews and was entered into the 47th Berlin International Film Festival, where it was nominated for the Golden Bear.

=== 2000s: Continued success ===
In 2000, Singelton co-wrote, co-produced and directed Shaft, a sequel-remake of the original 1971 film of the same name starring Richard Roundtree in the title role. Starring Samuel L. Jackson as Shaft's relative, John Shaft Jr., the film received generally positive reviews and was a box office success, grossing over $107 million worldwide.

In 2001, ten years after the release of Boyz n the Hood, Singleton wrote, produced, and directed Baby Boy, a coming-of-age comedy-drama about Jody Summers (played by Tyrese Gibson), a 20-year-old man who fathers two children by two different women- Yvette (played by Taraji P. Henson) and Peanut (played by Tamara LaSeon Bass) but still lives with his own mother (played by Adrienne-Joi Johnson) while he lives and learns in his everyday life in the hood of Los Angeles. The film received predominantly positive reviews, many of whom considered it to be a return to form for Singleton and one of his best films.

Singleton's next film was 2 Fast 2 Furious (2003), the sequel to The Fast and the Furious (2001) and the second installment in the Fast and Furious series. The film was a box office success, grossing over $236 million worldwide. It was the highest-grossing film in the series at the time, as well as the highest-grossing film of Singleton's career.

In 2005, Singleton teamed with writer-director Craig Brewer to finance and produce the independent film Hustle and Flow, once it was clear that most other major backers would not clear it for release. The film stars Terrence Howard as a Memphis hustler and pimp who faces his aspiration to become a rapper. Also starring Anthony Anderson and Taraji P. Henson in supporting roles, the film received positive reviews and earned two Academy Awards nominations for Best Actor and Best Original Song, winning the latter.

That same year, Singleton directed Four Brothers, a blaxploitation-inspired action film starring Mark Wahlberg, Tyrese Gibson, André Benjamin and Garrett Hedlund as four adopted brothers who return to their hometown of Detroit, Michigan to avenge the murder of their adoptive mother. The film received mixed reviews from critics but grossed $92 million worldwide.

In 2003, Singleton received a star at the Hollywood Walk of Fame.

=== 2010s: Unrealized projects ===
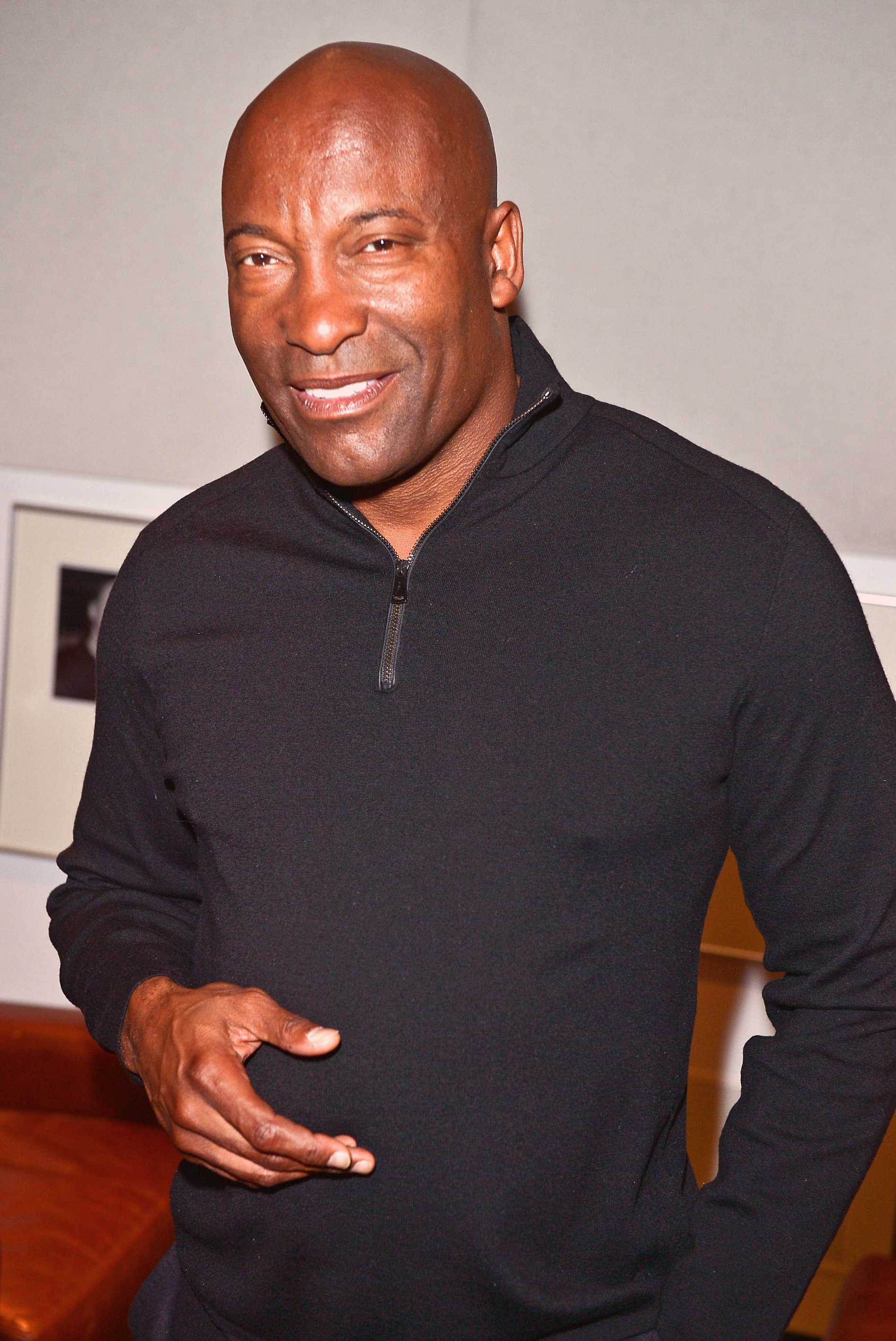
Singleton in 2013

Two years later, in 2013, Singleton was attached as the writer-director of a biopic about the life, career and death of rapper Tupac Shakur. On April 3, 2015, Singleton reported that production had been placed on hold. Following creative differences with Morgan Creek Productions, Singleton stepped down as director and was replaced by Carl Franklin; at the time, Singleton stated that he was planning on making a competing film about Tupac. The biopic that was placed on hold in 2015 was eventually released in 2017 as All Eyez on Me, which was negatively received by critics and audiences and Singleton himself.

=== 2017–2019: Transition to television and final years ===
Following the release of the critically panned action thriller film Abduction (2011), Singleton spent the final years of his career focusing on television.

After directing episodes of the critically acclaimed TV shows Empire and The People v. O. J. Simpson: American Crime Story, in 2017, he served as an executive producer and director of the crime drama series Rebel for BET, which focuses on Oakland police officer Rebecca "Rebel" Knight, who after her brother was killed by police, began working as a private investigator.

That same year, Snowfall, a crime drama series co-created and executively produced by Singleton for FX, premiered on July 5, 2017. Singleton co-wrote the screenplays for the first two episodes with series creators Eric Amadio and Dave Andron and directed the finales for the first two seasons. The series stars Damson Idris as Franklin Saint, a budding young drug dealer from South Central L.A., and it depicts how the community is affected by the 1980s crack epidemic, and the CIA involvement in trafficking the drug. This was one of the last projects Singleton worked on before his death in 2019.

== Influences and themes ==
Singleton cited filmmaker George Lucas and Lucas's original Star Wars film as one of his strongest influences, as well as the works of filmmaker Steven Spielberg and playwright August Wilson. Singleton was also influenced by his friend and fellow filmmaker Spike Lee. The two met in 1986, at a screening of Lee's film She's Gotta Have It, two weeks before Singleton started attending the University of Southern California (USC).

On March 19, 2014, Singleton criticized popular studios for "refusing to let African-Americans direct black-themed films". Singleton told an audience of students at Loyola Marymount University. "They ain't letting the black people tell the stories." He also added, "They want black people [to be] what they want them to be. And nobody is man enough to go and say that. They want black people to be who they want them to be, as opposed to what they are. The black films now—so-called black films now—they're great. They're great films. But they're just products. They're not moving the bar forward creatively. ...When you try to make it homogenized, when you try to make it appeal to everybody, then you don't have anything that's special."

== Personal life ==
Singleton had seven children.

His first child, Justice Maya Singleton, is named after the poet Maya Angelou.

Singleton had a son named Maasai Singleton (born April 3, 1996) and a daughter named Cleopatra "Cleo" Singleton (born September 6, 1998) with Vestria Barlow. On October 12, 1996, Singleton married Ghanaian actress Akosua Gyamama Busia, the daughter of Ghana's second Prime Minister Kofi Abrefa Busia. The couple had a daughter named Hadar Busia-Singleton (born April 3, 1997), who appeared in Tears of the Sun (2003) and other films. Singleton and Busia divorced in June 1997. He had one daughter in 2010 with Mitzi Andrews, an actress/model and teacher based in Toronto, Canada. He also had a son, Seven, with Rayvon Jones.

In 1999, Singleton pleaded no contest to misdemeanor battery charges after attacking an ex-girlfriend during a dispute over child visitation. He was sentenced to three years probation and ordered to make a film on domestic violence.

On August 23, 2007, Singleton was involved in an automobile accident in which he struck a jaywalking pedestrian, Constance Russell, 57, of Los Angeles. Staying on the scene until the police arrived, Singleton was not under the influence of alcohol or other substances, and was released after being questioned. Russell died later in the hospital. The case was turned over to the District Attorney, but no charges were filed.

== Death ==
On April 17, 2019, Singleton suffered a stroke and was placed under intensive care. He reportedly began to experience weakness in his legs after returning to the United States from a trip to Costa Rica. On April 25, it was reported that he was in a coma, but his daughter stated otherwise. On April 28, Singleton died at the age of 51 at Cedars-Sinai Medical Center after being removed from life support.

Dozens of actors and musicians paid tribute to him. American rapper and actor Ice Cube, who worked with Singleton in Boyz n the Hood and Higher Learning, said: "There are no words to express how sad I am to lose my brother, friend & mentor. He loved to bring the Black experience to the world."

A private funeral was held on May 6, 2019, in Los Angeles, and Singleton was buried at Forest Lawn Memorial Park, Hollywood Hills. The official cause of death was acute ischemic stroke, intracerebral hemorrhage, and hypertension.

== Filmography ==
=== Film ===
| Year | Title | Director | Writer | Producer | Executive soundtrack producer |
|---|---|---|---|---|---|
| 1991 | Boyz n the Hood | Yes | Yes | No | Yes |
| 1993 | Poetic Justice | Yes | Yes | Yes | Yes |
| 1995 | Higher Learning | Yes | Yes | Yes | Yes |
| 1997 | Rosewood | Yes | No | No | Yes |
| 2000 | Shaft | Yes | Yes | Yes | Yes |
| 2001 | Baby Boy | Yes | Yes | Yes | Yes |
| 2003 | 2 Fast 2 Furious | Yes | No | No | Yes |
| 2005 | Four Brothers | Yes | No | No | Yes |
| 2011 | Abduction | Yes | No | No | Yes |

Producer only

| Year | Title | Notes |
|---|---|---|
| 2005 | Hustle & Flow | |
| 2006 | Black Snake Moan | |
| 2007 | Illegal Tender | Also music supervisor |
| 2008 | The Making of Illegal Tender | Documentary short |

Executive producer

| Year | Title | Notes |
|---|---|---|
| 1998 | Woo | |
| 2004 | Time Out | Short film |
| 2014 | Through a Lens Darkly | Documentary film |

Acting roles

| Year | Title | Role | Notes |
|---|---|---|---|
| 1991 | Boyz n the Hood | Mailman | |
| 1994 | Beverly Hills Cop III | Fireman | |
| 1995 | Your Studio and You | Himself | Short film; Uncredited |
| 2000 | Shaft | Bored Cop with Tea Cup | Uncredited |
| 2001 | Baby Boy | Man Selling Bootleg Movies | Uncredited |
| 2003 | Baadasssss! | Detroit J | |

Other credits

| Year | Title | Role |
|---|---|---|
| 2002 | sIDney | Mentor to the director |

=== Television ===
| Year | Title | Director | Executive producer | Notes |
|---|---|---|---|---|
| 2009 | 81st Academy Awards | Yes | No | Segment "The Biggest Movie Event of the Year" |
| 2010 | 30 for 30 | Yes | No | Episode "Marion Jones: Press Pause" |
| 2015 | Empire | Yes | No | Episode "Dangerous Bonds" |
| 2016 | The People v. O. J. Simpson: American Crime Story | Yes | No | Episode "The Race Card" |
| 2017 | L.A. Burning: The Riots 25 Years Later | No | Yes | Documentary |
| 2017 | Rebel | Yes | Yes | Directed episode "Pilot" |
| 2017 | Billions | Yes | No | Episode "Victory Lap" |
| 2017–19 | Snowfall | Yes | Yes | Co-creator, director (2 episodes), also writer (2 episodes) |

As himself

| Year | Title | Notes |
|---|---|---|
| 2013 | The Game | 2 episodes |
| 2014 | Real Husbands of Hollywood | 2 episodes |

Production assistant

- Pee-wee's Playhouse (1986)
- Beach Boys: Endless Summer (1988)

=== Music video ===
| Year | Title | Artist | Role |
|---|---|---|---|
| 1992 | "Remember the Time" | Michael Jackson | Director |
| 2003 | "Act a Fool" | Ludacris | Himself |

== Accolades ==
| Year | Award | Category | Title | Result |
|---|---|---|---|---|
| 1991 | Academy Awards | Best Director | Boyz n the Hood | Nominated |
| 1991 | Academy Awards | Best Original Screenplay | Boyz n the Hood | Nominated |
| 2016 | Primetime Emmy Awards | Outstanding Directing for a Limited Series | The People v. O. J. Simpson: American Crime Story (For episode "The Race Card") | Nominated |
| 2017 | Primetime Emmy Awards | Outstanding Documentary | L.A. Burning: The Riots 25 Years Later | Nominated |

== See also ==
- List of black Academy Award winners and nominees
- List of oldest and youngest Academy Award winners and nominees — Youngest nominees for Best Director
