= Sumner, Florida =

Unincorporated community in Florida, U.S.

Coordinates: 29°13′01″N 82°58′03″W

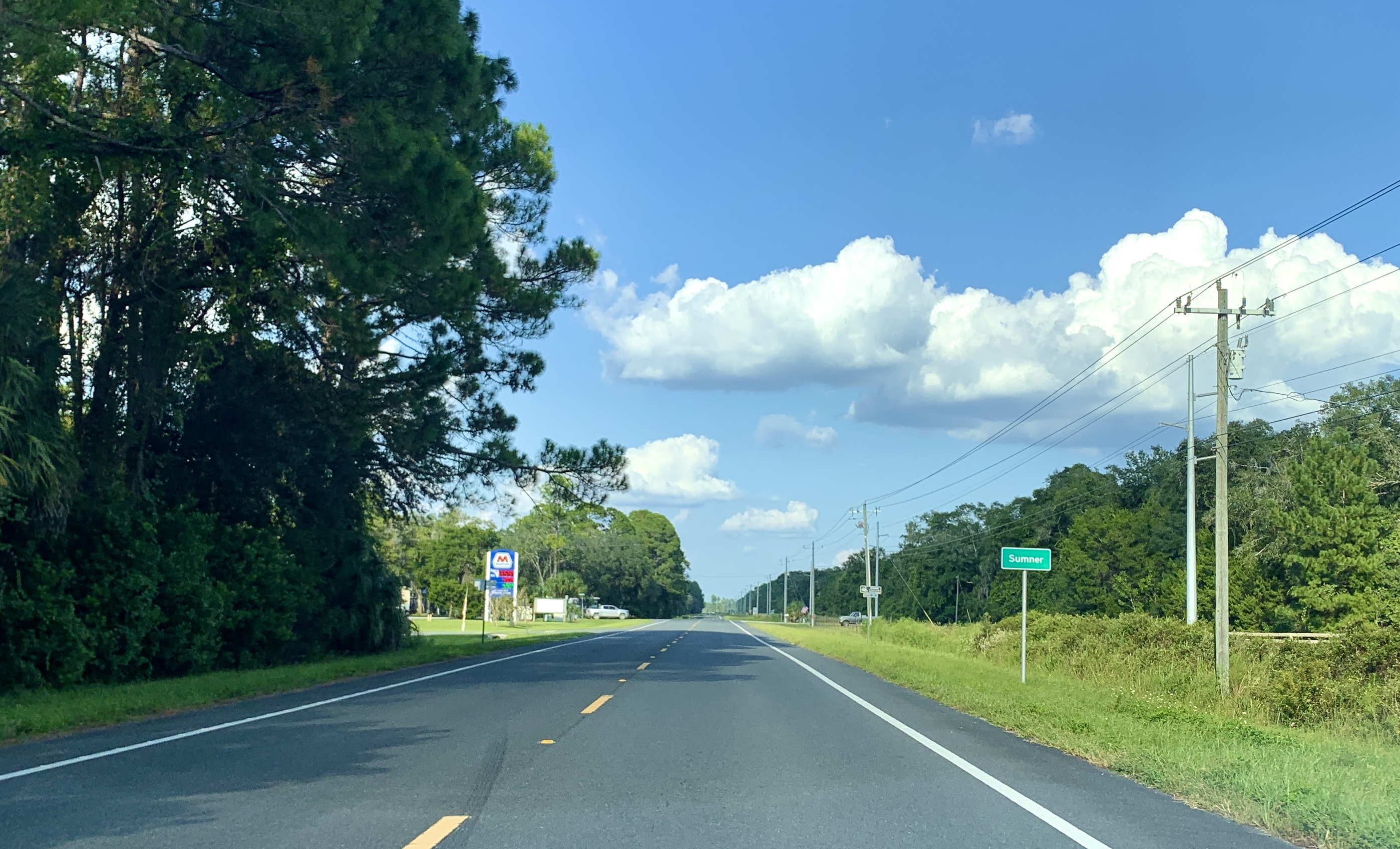
Sumner, Florida

Sumner is an unincorporated community in Levy County, Florida, United States. It is located on State Road 24, approximately 1 mile (1.6 km) southwest of Rosewood and 8 miles (13 km) northeast of Cedar Key.

== History ==
The founding of the community is unknown, however, the local post office opened up for the very first time in 1889. The same post office closed in 1908.

One of the most important events in the community's history occurred on New Year's Day 1923, a white woman from the community had accused a black man from the neighboring community of Rosewood of assault. After that, people from Sumner went on a manhunt in Rosewood in order to find the alleged criminal. The clashes caused civilian casualties and led to what would be known as the Rosewood massacre.
