= Rosewood, Florida =

Unincorporated community in Levy County, Florida, US

- Unincorporated community
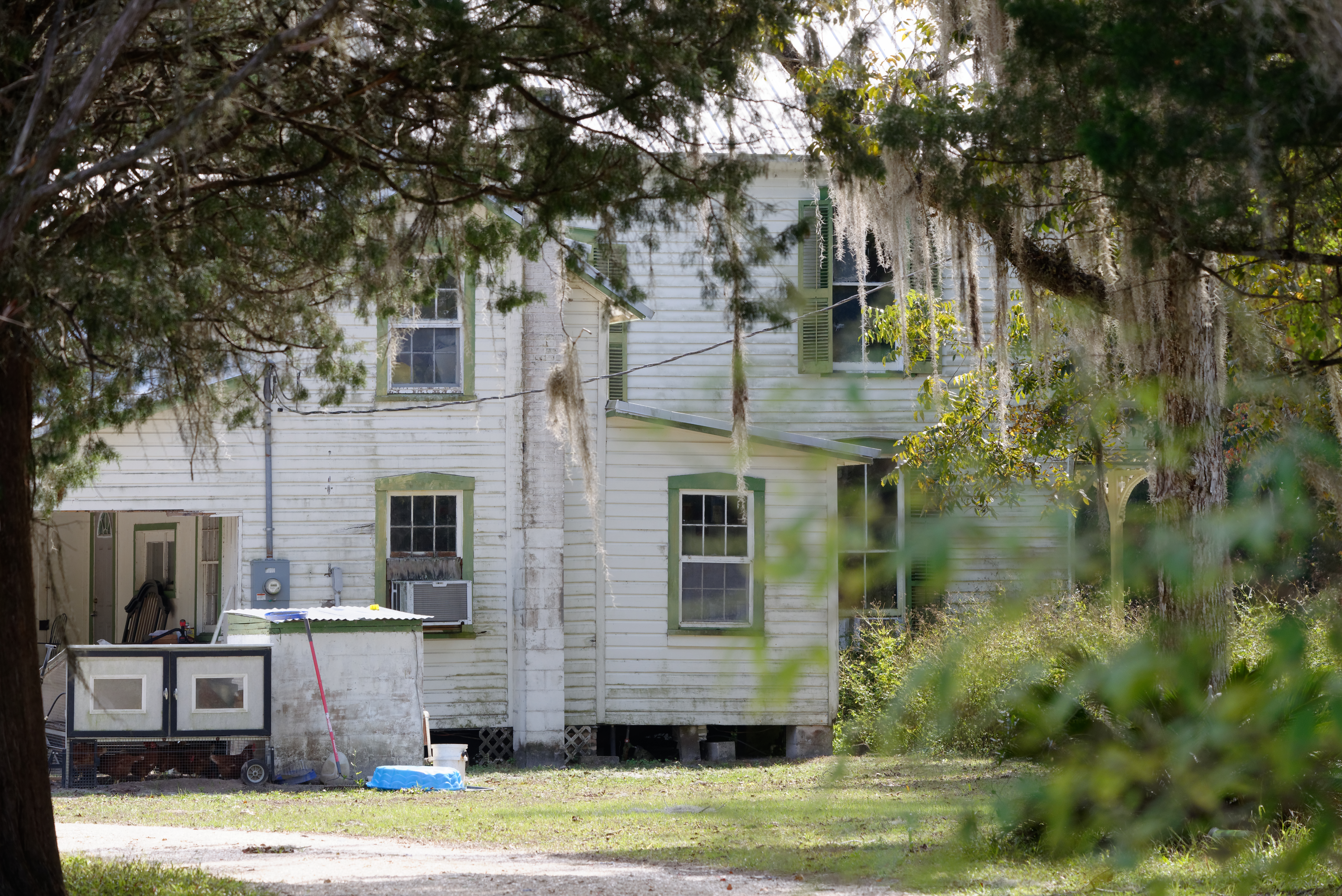
- House remaining in Rosewood

- Location within Florida Location within the United States
- Country: United States
- State: Florida
- County: Levy
- Elevation: 16 ft (4.9 m)
- Time zone: UTC-5 (Eastern (EST))
  - Summer (DST): UTC-4 (EDT)
- ZIP code: 32625
- Area code: 352
- GNIS feature ID: 295588

Rosewood is an unincorporated community in Levy County, Florida, United States, located just off State Road 24, approximately one mile (1.6 km) northeast of Sumner and nine miles (14 km) northeast of Cedar Key. The town is known for the 1923 Rosewood massacre, when a lynch mob of White residents from nearby towns destroyed its prosperous African-American community in response to the alleged rape of a White woman.

== History ==
=== Settlement ===
Rosewood was settled in 1845, with its industry centered on timber, from cedar trees; there were pencil mills in nearby Cedar Key. The initial settlers of Rosewood were both Black and White. When most of the cedar trees in the area had been cut by 1890, the pencil mills closed, and many White residents moved to Sumner. By 1900, the population in Rosewood had become predominantly Black. The village of Sumner was predominantly White, and relations between the two communities were relatively amicable. The population of Rosewood peaked in 1915 at 355 people.

Two Black families in Rosewood named Goins and Carrier were the most influential. The Goins family brought the turpentine industry to the area, and in the years preceding the attacks, were the second largest landowners in Levy County. To avoid lawsuits from White competitors, the Goins brothers moved to Gainesville, and the population of Rosewood decreased slightly. The Carriers were also a large family, responsible for logging in the region. By the 1920s, almost everyone in the close-knit community was distantly related to each other. Although residents of Rosewood probably did not vote because voter registration requirements in Florida had effectively disfranchised Blacks since the turn of the century, both Sumner and Rosewood were part of a single voting precinct counted by the U.S. Census. In 1920, the combined population of both towns was 344 Blacks and 294 Whites.

=== Before the massacre ===
As was common in the late 19th century South, Florida had imposed legal racial segregation under Jim Crow laws, requiring separate Black and White public facilities and transportation. Blacks and Whites created their own community centers: in 1920, the residents of Rosewood were mostly self-sufficient. They had three churches, a school, a large Masonic Hall, a turpentine mill, a sugarcane mill, a baseball team named the Rosewood Stars, and two general stores, one of which was White-owned. The village had about a dozen two-story wooden plank homes, other small two-room houses, and several small unoccupied plank farm and storage structures. Some families owned pianos, organs, and other symbols of middle-class prosperity. Survivors of the Rosewood massacre remember it as a happy place. In 1995 survivor Robie Mortin recalled at age 79, "Rosewood was a town where everyone's house was painted. There were roses everywhere you walked. Lovely."

== Etymology ==
The name "Rosewood" refers to the reddish color of cut cedar wood.

== Economy ==
=== Before 1923 ===
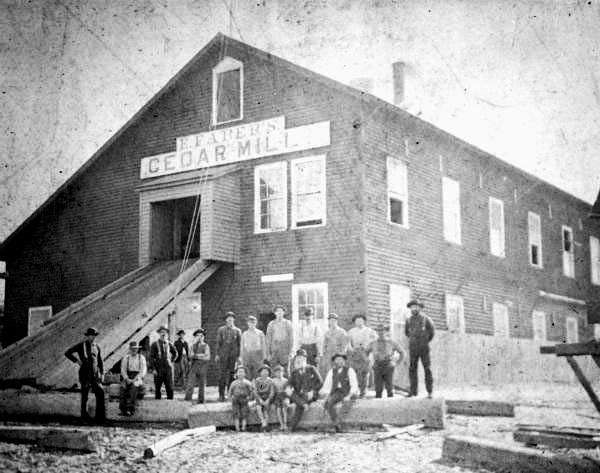
This pencil mill in Cedar Key was an integral part of local industry.

Rosewood was settled in 1845, 9 miles (14 km) east of Cedar Key, near the Gulf of Mexico. The local industry was centered on timber. Two pencil mills were nearby in Cedar Key; several turpentine mills and a sawmill 3 miles (5 km) away in Sumner helped support local residents, as did farming of citrus and cotton. The hamlet grew enough to warrant the construction of a post office and train depot on the Florida Railroad in 1870, but it was never incorporated as a town.

=== Decline of Rosewood's economy (1923–1950) ===
In 1923, during the infamous Rosewood massacre, the entire town of Rosewood was razed except for John Wright's General Store. After the majority of the population fled Rosewood, the once profitable turpentine industry began to fade as newer, alternative synthetic products were being produced. By 1950, the turpentine industry practically no longer existed.

=== Since 1950 ===
Since the 1950s, several businesses were established in Rosewood, including a general store; fisheries; charter tours; clam, oysters and other types of Mollusca farmers; agricultural farms; restaurants; storage facilities and a small airfield. Several neighborhoods have been developed around these businesses.

== Rosewood Massacre ==
In January 1923, white men from nearby towns lynched Sam Carter allegedly in response to a claim that a white woman, Fannie Taylor, in nearby Sumner had been beaten and possibly raped by a Black drifter. When Black citizens defended themselves against further attack, several hundred Whites organized to comb the countryside hunting for Black residents and burned almost every structure in Rosewood. Survivors hid for several days in nearby swamps and were evacuated by train and car to larger towns. The local sheriff and the Governor refused to send aid, including the National Guard. Although state and local authorities were aware of the violence, they made no arrests for the activities in Rosewood. The town was abandoned by Black residents during the attacks. None ever returned.

=== Massacre reparations ===
In the spring of 1994, the Florida state legislature voted to award $2 million in compensation for the nine surviving family members (equaling $150,000 each). In December 2010, a state scholarship was established for descendants of families that survived the massacre. Governor Jeb Bush in 2004 placed a plaque memorializing the massacre in front of John Wright's general store, the only remaining structure from the Rosewood Massacre. This plaque was vandalized on at least one occasion when it was shot at from a passing car.

=== Legal Issues ===
During the debate over Florida House Bill 591, the Florida Legislature's Bill that established reparations based on the Massacre, the Special Master appointed by the Legislature compared the destruction of Rosewood to the taking of private homes during the Internment of Japanese Americans and specifically cited the case of William Minoru Hohri vs. United States.

== Community services ==
In 1980, the Rosewood Volunteer Fire Department was officially established and the station number was designated as 80 in District 4.

== Education ==
School Board of Levy County is the school district for the entire county.

== See also ==
- Rosewood – 1997 film directed by John Singleton
